= Wyszanów massacre =

- Part of the Invasion of Poland (1939)
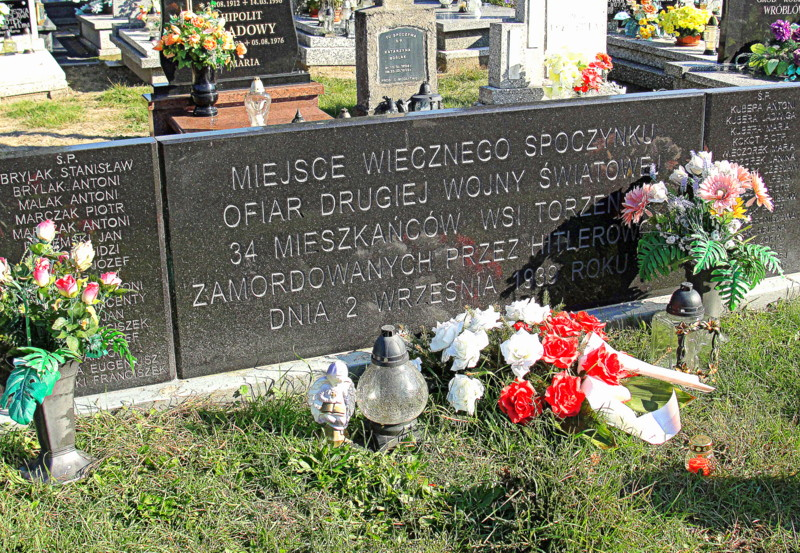
- Mass grave of the massacre victims at the cemetery in Wyszanów

- Wyszanów massacre (Poland)
- Location: 51°21′30″N 18°09′41″E; Wyszanów, Poland
- Date: September 2, 1939
- Attack type: Mass murder
- Deaths: 24
- Perpetrator: 10th Infantry Division of the Wehrmacht

The Wyszanów massacre, which occurred on September 2, 1939, in the village of Wyszanów was a war crime committed by the Wehrmacht during its invasion of Poland. On that day, 22 Poles, mostly elderly people, women, and children, died from bullets, flames, and grenades thrown into the basements. Men from Wyszanów who were able to carry weapons had been deported to Germany the day before, and en route, two of them were killed by guards.

== Prelude ==
Wyszanów is currently a village situated in Wieruszów County. Before the Second World War, it was a part of Kępno County and located approximately 30 kilometers from the then Polish-German border.

On September 1, 1939, the first day of the German invasion of Poland, probably around 2 p.m. Wehrmacht troops entered the village. Wyszanów was occupied without a single shot being fired because there were no units of the Polish Army stationed in the village; only soldiers from the defeated Polish units sneaked through its fences from time to time.

Upon entering Wyszanów, the soldiers detained almost all men capable of carrying weapons (approximately 30 people). They were imprisoned in a house opposite the church, where they were joined by a dozen or so Polish prisoners of war. On September 2 in the morning, the Germans took all the detainees towards Podzamcze. The men from Wyszanów were then taken to a internment camp near Nuremberg, where they spent several weeks. On the way, near Mechnice, German guards killed two detainees from Wyszanów – Walenty Kos and Michał Powolny.

== The massacre ==
=== The course of events ===
The morning of September 2 passed relatively calmly in Wyszanów. However, around noon, a new German unit entered the village. Soon, a violent shooting broke out. Subsequently, the Germans initiated the pacification of Wyszanów. The soldiers went from house to house, setting buildings ablaze and throwing hand grenades into cellars. Most of the village inhabitants were gathered at the local inn. Several people were shot, including Hipolit Stasiak (accused of shooting at German soldiers), and Adam Kałamuk (taken to the local parsonage and murdered there). Also, Wincenty Wolny from nearby Lubczyna was killed in unexplained circumstances.

The most tragic incident occurred on Marcin Szyszka's farm, where 21 women and children had sought refuge in the basement. German soldiers threw hand grenades into the basement, resulting in the immediate death of 13 people, while another three succumbed to their injuries in the hospital. (Note: A slightly different version of events can be found in Szymon Datner's work 55 days of the Wehrmacht in Poland. Crimes committed against the Polish civilian population in the period September 1 – October 25, 1939. Datner claimed that the massacre took place in the basement of the "former Wyszanów manor house", and that German grenades were supposed to kill 11 people there – ten children and an 80-year-old old man. Three more people were to die in hospital (See: Datner (1967), p. 171–172.). These discrepancies result primarily from the fact that Datner based his work on a secondary source – i.e. the account Von Blaskowitz enters Kępno. Remarks on Germans against the background of memories from 1939 by Jan Ross (a medicine doctor by profession), written just after the end of the war. However, newer publications describing the pacification of Wyszanów are based on the original testimonies of eyewitnesses to the massacre. See: Galiński (1986), pp. 46–48 and Böhler (2009), p. 126–127.) The victims included Szyszka's wife and his four children, aged 3 to 12. (Note: Marcin Szyszka had been deported to Germany a few hours earlier. He learned about the fate of his family only a few weeks later, after returning to Wyszanów. See: Galiński (1986), pp. 46–47.)

According to Wacław Majchrzak's calculations on September 2, 1939, 22 Poles were murdered in Wyszanów. If two men shot near Mechnice are to be included, the number of victims of the pacification increases to 24. Among those killed were 11 children. The Germans burned 27 farms, with 12 being completely destroyed and 15 partially damaged.

=== The cause and the perpetrators ===
Polish historians speculated that the massacre was carried out in revenge for the pro-Polish attitude shown by the inhabitants of Wyszanów during the Greater Poland uprising of 1918–1919 or as retaliation for the resistance put up by a handful of Polish soldiers at the folwark in nearby Lubczyna. However, according to the findings of German historian Jochen Böhler, the massacre in Wyszanów was more likely the result of the "partisan psychosis" prevailing in the ranks of the Wehrmacht at that time. While a German unit was marching through the village, an accidental shooting occurred. No Germans were harmed as a result—there were no Polish soldiers in the village, or even men capable of carrying weapons. However, the nervous and inexperienced soldiers concluded that the shooting was caused by a "partisan attack" and immediately initiated a brutal retaliatory action, targeting defenseless civilians.

For a long time, the German unit that pacified Wyszanów was unknown. Polish historians speculated that it could have been the Leibstandarte SS Adolf Hitler regiment. However, documents obtained by Jochen Böhler reveal that the massacre was committed by soldiers of the 3rd motorized company of the 10th Pioneer Battalion (Pionier-Bataillon 10) from Ingolstadt, (Note: The battalion was commanded by Captain Bloch. See: Böhler (2009), p. 127.) part of the 10th Infantry Division.

Sergeant Simmet, the commander of one of the subunits of this unit, was the author of a dramatized report on the fighting in Poland, entitled Brückenschlag und Häuserkampf in Ostrówek ("Construction of bridges and fighting for buildings in Ostrówek"). In that document, the pacification of Wyszanów was described as revenge against "Murderers from Wyszanów lurking in windows and ambushes." Simmet wrote, among other things:

These shady-looking individuals thought they could stop us, pioneers, in our victorious march. They didn't know our slogan: "quickly and ruthlessly." International law provides only the death penalty for guerrillas. And very well. We even buried them, although not in a Christian way, because each of them was in a separate crematorium!

Almost simultaneously, soldiers of the 10th Infantry Division also pacified the neighboring Torzeniec (approximately 4 kilometers east of Wyszanów). On the night of September 1–2, 1939, the 41st Infantry Regiment burned the village and murdered sixteen of its inhabitants. The next day, eighteen more men from Torzeniec and three prisoners of war were shot, bringing the total number of pacification victims to 37.

== Aftermath ==
On September 20, 1939, the victims of the pacification of Wyszanów and Torzeniec were exhumed and buried at the cemetery in Wyszanów. The remains of 20 victims of the Wyszanów massacre were buried there. The bodies of Walenty Kos and Michał Powolny, as well as Stefania Kanicka and Łucja-Helena Wróbel (who died of wounds) were buried in the cemetery in Mechnice.

== Bibliography ==
- Böhler, Jochen (2009). Zbrodnie Wehrmachtu w Polsce [Wehrmacht crimes in Poland] (in Polish). Kraków: Wydawnictwo "Znak". ISBN 978-83-240-1225-1.
- Böhler, Jochen (2011). Najazd 1939. Niemcy przeciw Polsce [Invasion 1939. Germany against Poland] (in Polish). Kraków: Wydawnictwo "Znak". ISBN 978-83-240-1808-6.
- Datner, Szymon (1967). 55 dni Wehrmachtu w Polsce. Zbrodnie dokonane na polskiej ludności cywilnej w okresie 1.IX – 25.X. 1939 r [55 days of the Wehrmacht in Poland. Crimes committed against the Polish civilian population in the period September 1 – October 25, 1939] (in Polish). Warszawa: Wydawnictwo MON.
- Galiński, Antoni, ed. (1986). Zbrodnie Wehrmachtu w Wielkopolsce w okresie zarządu wojskowego (1 września – 25 października 1939) [Wehrmacht crimes in Greater Poland during the military administration period (September 1 – October 25, 1939)] (in Polish). Kalisz: OKBZH w Łodzi – Instytut Pamięci Narodowej.
