= Parcice =

- Village
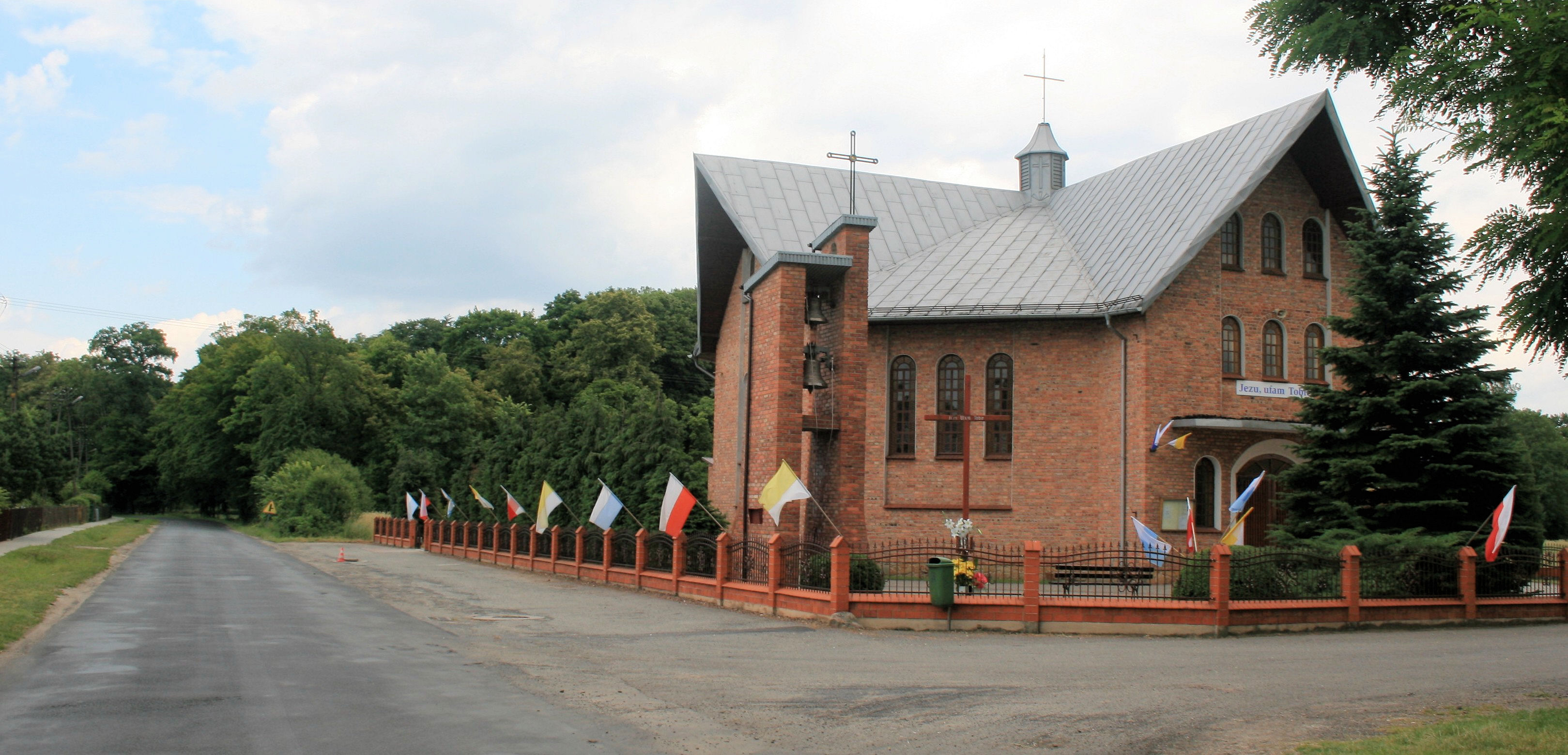
- Church in Parcice

- Location within Poland
- Coordinates: 51°14′N 18°19′E
- Country: Poland
- Voivodeship: Łódź
- County: Wieruszów
- Gmina: Czastary

Parcice [parˈt͡ɕit͡sɛ] is a village in the administrative district of Gmina Czastary, within Wieruszów County, Łódź Voivodeship, in central Poland.

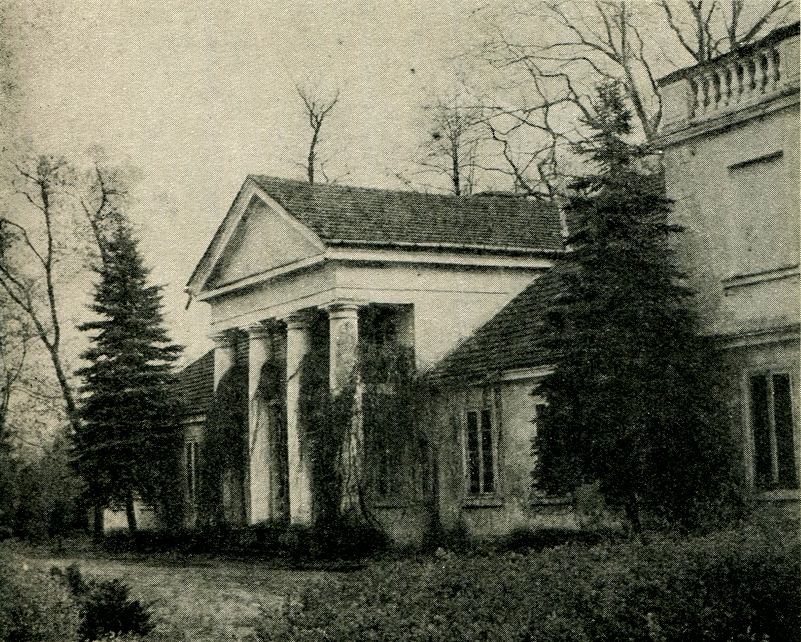
Manor house in Parcice in the 1960s.

== History ==
Parcice was first mentioned in a document from 1403 issued for the mendicant brotherhood in Bolesławiec. At that time, the village was ruled by Jan of Parcice. In 1461, Małgorzata, Jan's widow, gave the village to her descendant Mikołaj Gruszczyński, the cup-bearer of Poznań and the starost of Odolanów. In 1465, Jan Cieciorka of Wyszanów sold Parcice to Sędziwoj of Niedzielisko.

In 1552, the Parcice estate was owned by Jan, Antoni and Zygmunt Madaliński. It consisted of 1,608 morgens of arable land, 669 acres of meadows, 36 acres of pastures and 101 acres of forest, as well as a watermill and a windmill. In the 17th century, the estate belonged to the Kochlewski family, a moderately wealthy family who were followers of Calvinism and built a church there at their own expense. There was also a Calvinist cemetery in the village. After the Kochlewskis, the owners were the Potrowskis, Koseckis and Trepkas. The last of the Trepka was Leopold, who also owned estates in Młynisko, Łyskornia and Mokrsko. Towards the end of his life, he converted to Catholicism and built a church in Czastary at his own expense, which was consecrated in 1847. Ferdynand Magnuski, who came from the area around Sieradz, acquired the estate from Leopold Trepka. Ferdynand had two sons: Władysław and Bolesław. The estate in Parcice was taken over by the latter. While his father was still alive, he brought in engineers from France, who marked out flower beds and alleys in the park according to French patterns. Over time, Bolesław ran up a lot of debts because he travelled abroad. Having a lot of debts, he looked for a rich candidate for a wife to marry. After some time, he found a partner in the Province of Posen in the Prussian Partition – her name was Józefa Biegańska. The future father-in-law came to inspect the local estate, Bolesław Magnuski took him around, showing him his properties, and at the same time the state forests as his own. The wealthy lady's dowry amounted to 200,000 thalers (1 thaler = 6 marks).

On April 21, 1863, an insurgent unit led by Franciszek Parczewski, who had fought a skirmish with the Russians the day before near Stary Ochędzyn, and a day later a battle near Rudniki, rested in the village.

According to the description in the Geographical Dictionary published in Warsaw in 1886, the Parcice estate stretched over a distance of 7 km (4 mi), from the village of Koryta to the western lands of the village of Jaworek.

In 1928, the village was inhabited by 725 people.

=== World War II ===
On September 1, 1939, an episode of the battle of Krajanka took place in Parcice. Parcice was defended by the National Defense Battalions "Wieluń I" and "Wieluń II". At about 6 p.m., the Poles began to retreat towards Czastary. At 6:30 p.m., the Germans attacked Parcice, and at about 8 p.m., Czastary. 6 Polish soldiers and 4 soldiers of the Leibstandarte SS regiment "Adolf Hitler" were killed in the battle. The fallen are commemorated by a monument in Krajanka. The Polish soldiers are buried in the parish cemetery in Czastary.

During World War II, some families were resettled and the name of the village was changed to Kalwinsdorf, due to the fact that the village was inhabited by Calvinists from the 17th to the 19th century (the aforementioned Kochlewskis and Trepkóws).

After the German attack on the USSR in July 1941, about 20 households around the manor house in Parcice were resettled. The Germans created a 100-hectare estate there. Five farmers had been previously evicted, and in September 1941 almost all the wealthier farmers were evicted. Germans from Bavaria were resettled in their place. Several more families were deported later. It is estimated that 14 residents of Parcice died during World War II, including two during the defensive war in 1939.

In the years 1954–1968, the village was the seat of the Parcice commune, and after its abolition it belonged to the Czastary commune. In the years 1975–1998, the town administratively belonged to the Kalisz Voivodeship.

== Manor ==
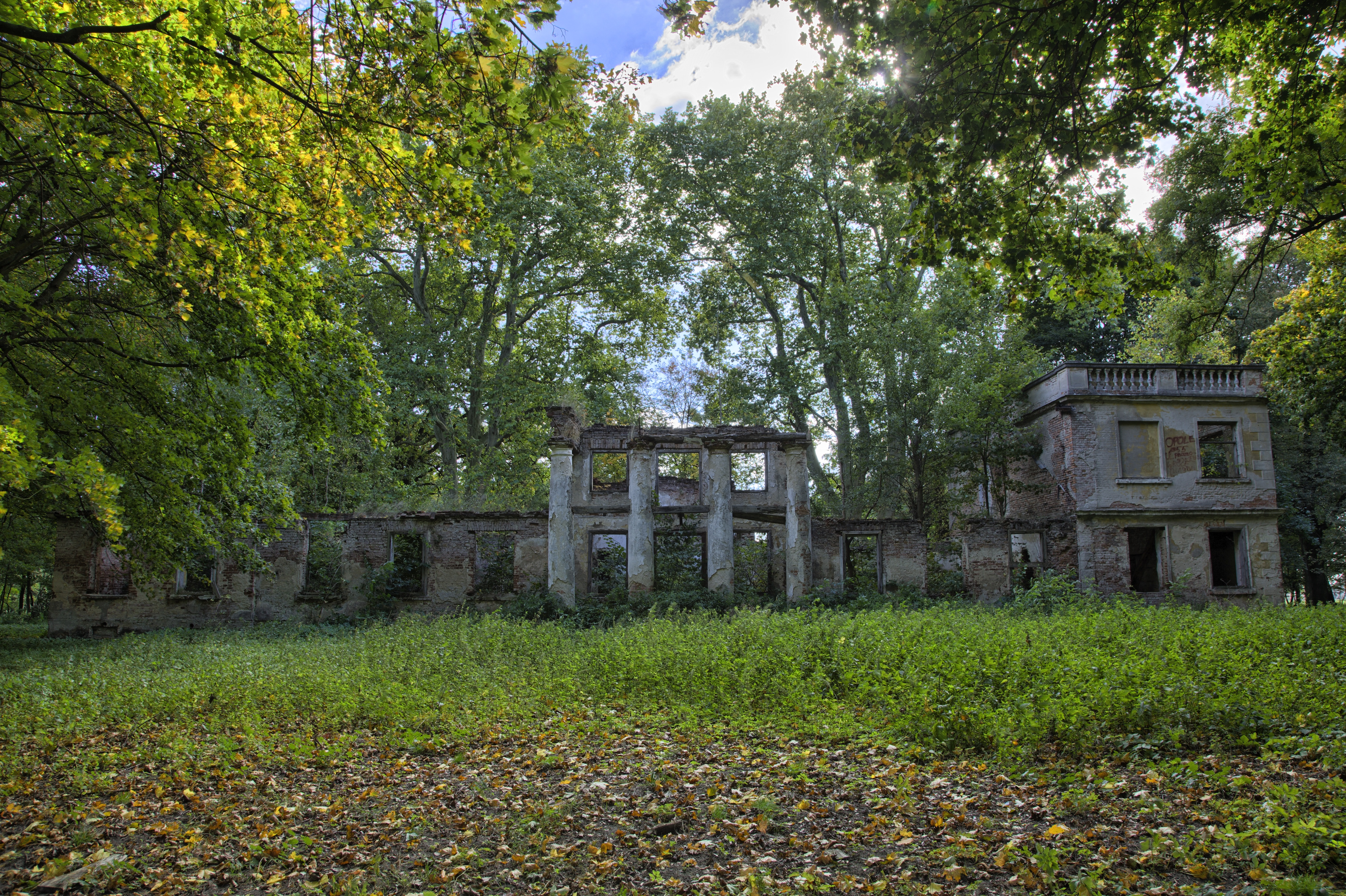
Ruins of the Manor in Parcice

Parcice is a village with a picturesque park with the ruins of a noble manor house. The manor house was built in the late 18th century. It was built in the classicist style, with a four-column portico and an oval salon on the axis. Currently very neglected due to lack of financial resources, it has almost completely fallen into ruin. Previously, it was the seat of the nobility of Elżbieta Czartoryska, as evidenced by a tombstone from 1623, which was found right after the war and taken to the cemetery in Czastary. The later builder was Count Leopold Trepka, a fervent supporter of Calvinism. Then the owners were the Magnuscy family and Witold Nowicki. After World War II, a primary school operated in the manor house. The manor was devastated in the 1980s and 1990s. Within the park there are two Californian plane trees, unique in Europe, and a very old oak tree, the circumference of which is 6.25 m. In the manor, one could admire stylish joinery, floors, fireplaces and stucco: stylish tiled stoves were found and saved, which are located in the Museum in Ożarów (5 stoves). Currently, the destroyed ruins are in private hands. Since 2008, at the beginning of July, the manor park has hosted an exhibition of horses from the Wieruszów County.

== Bibliography ==
- The history of the Gmina Czastary and the manor house in Parcice
- History of the Gmina Czastary and the manor house in Parcice - Gmina Czastary website (in Polish)
- Historical and geographical dictionary of Polish lands in the Middle Ages (in Polish)
