= Rybka (disambiguation) =

Rybka (which means "little fish" in many Slavic languages) may refer to:

- Rybka, a chess computer program
- Rybka Lututowska, a village in Poland
- Rybka Sokolska, a village in Poland
- Rybka (surname)
