= Rzepisko =

Rzepisko may refer to:

- Rzepisko, a village in Łódź Voivodeship, Poland
- Rzepisko, a hamlet in West Pomeranian Voivodeship, Poland
