= Torzeniec massacre =

- Part of the Invasion of Poland (1939)
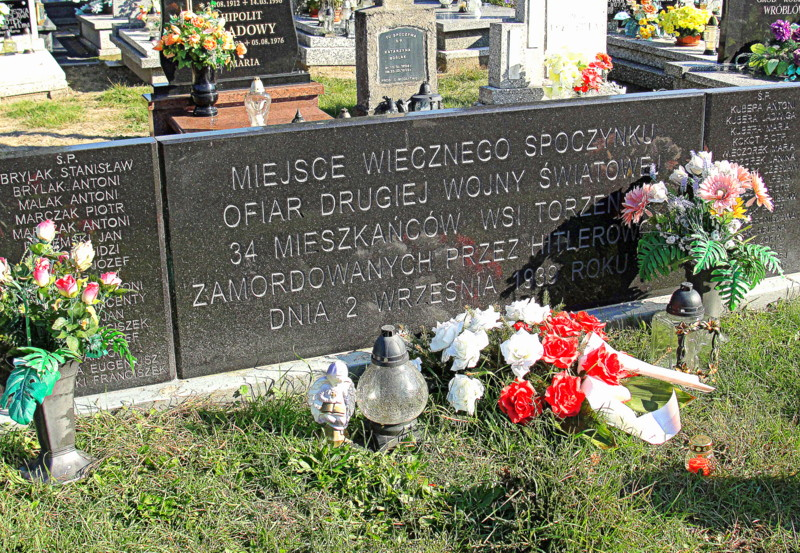
- Mass grave of the massacre victims at the cemetery in Wyszanów

- Torzeniec massacre (Poland)
- Location: 51°22′11″N 18°06′33″E; Torzeniec, Poland
- Date: September 1–2, 1939
- Attack type: Mass murder
- Deaths: 37
- Perpetrator: 10th Infantry Division of the Wehrmacht

The Torzeniec massacre, which occurred on September 1–2, 1939, in the village of Torzeniec was a war crime committed by the Wehrmacht during its invasion of Poland. During these days, soldiers of the 10th Infantry Division killed 37 Poles, including 34 inhabitants of Torzeniec, while the village itself was partially burned.

== The massacre on the night of September 1–2 ==
On September 1, 1939, the first day of the German invasion of Poland, around 7 p.m., soldiers of the 41st Infantry Regiment of the 10th Infantry Division entered Torzeniec. Initially, the soldiers behaved correctly towards the inhabitants, calling on villagers to remain calm and assuring them that they were not in any danger. Meanwhile, Wehrmacht columns were constantly passing through Torzeniec.

Around 11 p.m., a violent shooting broke out in the village, resulting in the death of three German soldiers and the wounding of four others. It was with great difficulty that the outbreak of panic in the German troops was stopped. The soldiers were convinced that they were attacked by Polish partisans, supported by the villagers from Torzeniec. They claimed that "all the men living in the village, and in individual cases — as it was established beyond any doubt — even the women" took part in the shooting.

However, the official version of events presented in the war diary of the 41st Infantry Regiment contains many contradictions. On the one hand, it was reported that "the entire village" participated in the attack on German soldiers, only to state elsewhere that in the dark "it was impossible to distinguish our soldiers from the enemy." Also, the first reports did not contain information about any Pole being caught red-handed with a gun in his hand. Furthermore, no weapons or ammunition were found in Torzeniec. Only in one of the later reports was it mentioned that one alleged shooter was found, who turned out to be an unnamed "civilian." For this reason, both Polish and German historians believe that the shooting was most likely a case of friendly fire triggered by inexperienced German recruits.

That same night, German soldiers began to pacify the village. Houses were set on fire or thrown with hand grenades. People fleeing in panic were either shot or bayoneted. A total of 16 inhabitants of Torzeniec died that night, including five women and six children. The age of the victims ranged from 6 months to 75 years. While eight residents of Torzeniec, including the Pietrzak family of three, were shot or bayoneted, another eight victims (women and children from the Kubera, Muskała, and Wieczorek families) were burned alive in a barn set on fire by the German soldiers. (Note: After the shooting began, the women and children sought refuge in a basement beneath Antoni Kubera's barn. When the Germans set fire to the buildings, the blaze blocked their only exit route. See: Galiński (1986), p. 51.)

== A court-martial and execution of hostages ==
The following day, Colonel Friedrich Gollwitzer, commander of the 41st Infantry Regiment, ordered a "radical purge and retaliatory action" in the village. All residents of Torzeniec, including women and children, were gathered near Teofil Baślak's farm at the village center. On the way, 43-year-old Maria Stambula was severely shot because, according to the Germans, she was walking too slowly to the assembly point. Upon arrival, soldiers separated the men from the women and children. A court-martial was announced, sentencing all men from Torzeniec to death. (Note: The written sentence for the verdict did not include any mention of the civilian mentioned in later German reports who allegedly caused the night shooting. See: Böhler (2009), p. 124.)

From the group of men, soldiers selected every second person. The eighteen Poles chosen in this manner were then shot in the yard of Baślak's farm. One of the victims was 40-year-old Józef Sadowski, who voluntarily gave his life for his 70-year-old father. After the execution, the Germans ordered the bodies to be buried in a mass grave behind Baślak's pigsty. The surviving inhabitants of Torzeniec were forced to stand by the road with their hands raised for some time before being driven to a nearby meadow, where they were kept under guard until the afternoon. After their release, some sought shelter in the nearby forest.

According to Ignacy Rybczak's testimony, on the same day, the Germans also murdered three Polish prisoners of war in his yard. This increased the number of victims of the Torzeniec massacre to 37 people. The murdered POWs most likely belonged to the paramilitary National Defense.

Almost simultaneously, on September 2, 1939, soldiers of the 10th Infantry Division also pacified the neighboring Wyszanów. There, 22 Poles, mostly elderly people, women, and children, died from bullets, flames, and grenades thrown into the basements. Men from Wyszanów who were able to carry weapons had been deported to Germany the day before, and en route, two of them were killed by guards.

== Aftermath ==
On September 20, 1939, the victims of the Wyszanów and Torzeniec massacres were exhumed and buried at the cemetery in Wyszanów. After the war, a monument with a commemorative plaque was erected at the place of execution in Torzeniec in honor of the victims of the pacification.

In 1968, the Central Office of the State Justice Administrations for the Investigation of National Socialist Crimes in Ludwigsburg received a letter from Wehrmacht veteran, known by the initials Ferdinand D. In the letter, he provided incriminating testimony against the commander of the 41st Infantry Regiment, Colonel Friedrich Gollwitzer (then a retired general). He stated, among other things:

The actions of the 41st Infantry Regiment infantry under the command of Colonel Gollwitzer [...] were nothing less than genocide. Even though there were no partisans in Poland yet, almost no villages survived in the area from Kalisz to Warsaw, because Gollwitzer caused and fueled a psychosis about partisans in his soldiers.

As a result of this testimony, the prosecutor's office in Amberg reopened the proceedings against Gollwitzer that had been started four years earlier. During the investigation, it was found that the death sentence imposed on 18 residents of Torzeniec was a gross violation of international law because it was issued without all formal and legal procedures (the accused were not heard, they were not allowed to say the last word, they were not provided with a defense attorney). In particular, attention was drawn to the fact that Gollwitzer passed the judgment alone, while according to the regulations in force at that time, the court-martial should have included three officers. This meant that 18 Poles were not executed based on a court verdict but as a result of an arbitrary decision by the colonel.

However, the prosecutor's office assumed that there was no proof that Gollwitzer was guided by "unnatural joy resulting from the destruction of human life" during his actions in Torzeniec. Also, the defense argument presented by Gollwitzer that the massacres were a justified response to the attack of Polish partisans was generally accepted, and it was concluded that his culpability for murder could not be proven. West German prosecutors also concluded that "there is no need to conduct further investigations, especially at the crime scene, as they would not bring anything new to the case." As a result, the proceedings against Gollwitzer were discontinued.

== Bibliography ==
- Böhler, Jochen (2009). Zbrodnie Wehrmachtu w Polsce [Wehrmacht crimes in Poland] (in Polish). Kraków: Wydawnictwo "Znak". ISBN 978-83-240-1225-1.
- Datner, Szymon (1967). 55 dni Wehrmachtu w Polsce. Zbrodnie dokonane na polskiej ludności cywilnej w okresie 1.IX – 25.X. 1939 r [55 days of the Wehrmacht in Poland. Crimes committed against the Polish civilian population in the period September 1 – October 25, 1939] (in Polish). Warszawa: Wydawnictwo MON.
- Galiński, Antoni, ed. (1986). Zbrodnie Wehrmachtu w Wielkopolsce w okresie zarządu wojskowego (1 września – 25 października 1939) [Wehrmacht crimes in Greater Poland during the military administration period (September 1 – October 25, 1939)] (in Polish). Kalisz: OKBZH w Łodzi – Instytut Pamięci Narodowej.
