= Przybyłów, Łódź Voivodeship =

Przybyłów
- Village
- Location within Poland
- Coordinates: 51°22′50″N 18°19′49″E
- Country: Poland
- Voivodeship: Łódź
- County: Wieruszów
- Gmina: Galewice

Przybyłów [pʂɨˈbɨwuf] is a village in the administrative district of Gmina Galewice, within Wieruszów County, Łódź Voivodeship, in central Poland.
