= Brzózki =

Brzózki may refer to the following places:

- Brzózki, Kuyavian-Pomeranian Voivodeship (north-central Poland)
- Brzózki, Łódź Voivodeship (central Poland)
- Brzózki, Podlaskie Voivodeship (north-east Poland)
- Brzózki, Greater Poland Voivodeship (west-central Poland)
- Brzózki, Gmina Lipie in Silesian Voivodeship (south Poland)
- Brzózki, Gmina Popów in Silesian Voivodeship (south Poland)
- Brzózki, Pomeranian Voivodeship (north Poland)
- Brzózki, Warmian-Masurian Voivodeship (north Poland)
- Brzózki, West Pomeranian Voivodeship (north-west Poland)
