= Stępna =

Settlement in Poland

- Settlement
- Location within Poland
- Coordinates: 51°15′38″N 18°21′35″E
- Country: Poland
- Voivodeship: Łódź
- County: Wieruszów
- Gmina: Czastary
- Population: 100

Stępna [ˈstɛmpna] is a settlement in the administrative district of Gmina Czastary, within Wieruszów County, Łódź Voivodeship, in central Poland.
