= Radostów Pierwszy =

- Village
- Location within Poland
- Coordinates: 51°12′54″N 18°17′46″E
- Country: Poland
- Voivodeship: Łódź
- County: Wieruszów
- Gmina: Czastary
- Population: 280

Radostów Pierwszy [raˈdɔstuf ˈpjɛrfʂɨ] is a village in the administrative district of Gmina Czastary, within Wieruszów County, Łódź Voivodeship, in central Poland.
