= Gmina Czastary =

Gmina Czastary Czastary Commune
- Gmina
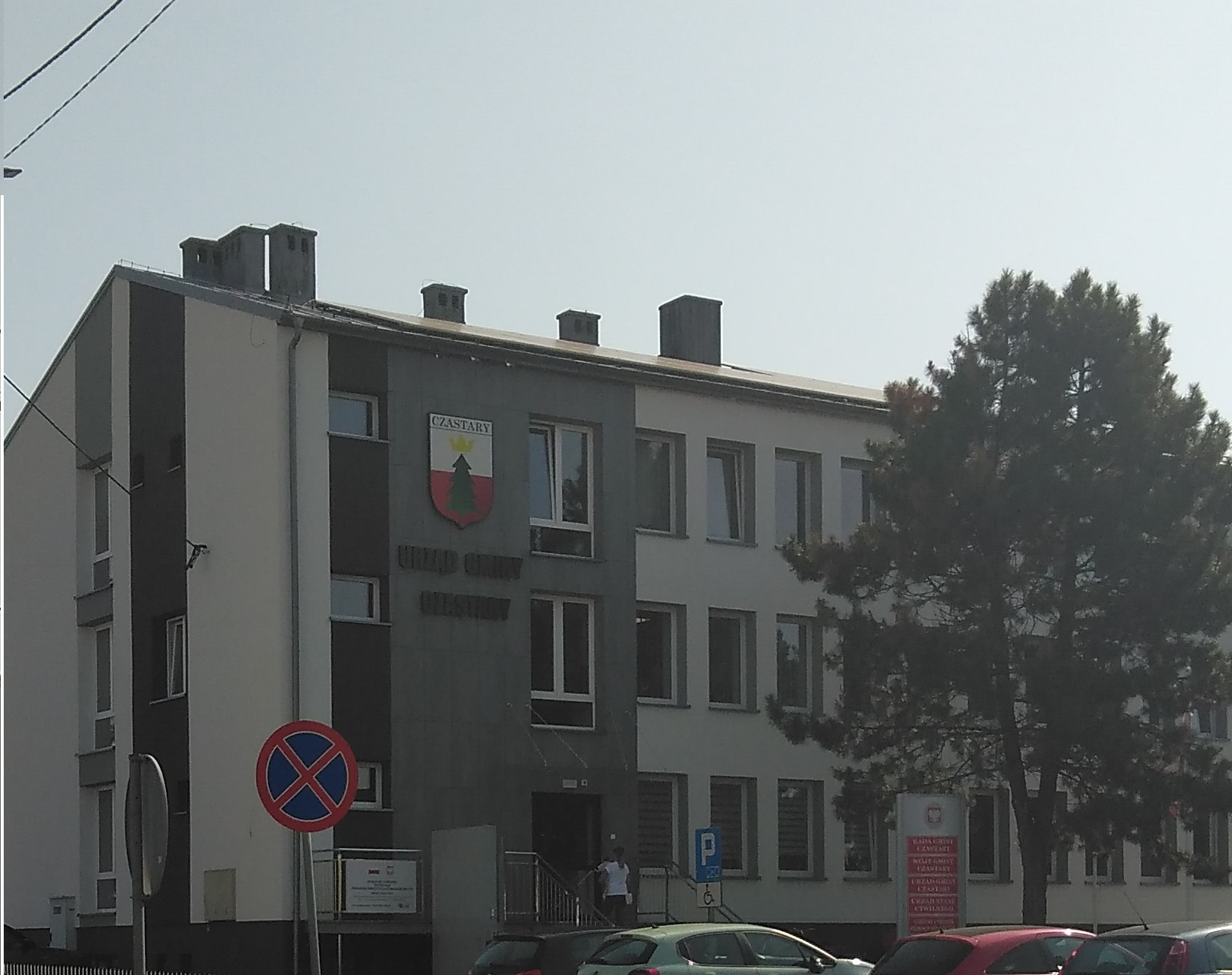
- Municipal hall of Czastary

- Coat of arms
- Interactive map of Gmina Czastary
- Coordinates (Czastary): 51°15′33″N 18°19′10″E
- Country: Poland
- Voivodeship: Łódź
- County: Wieruszów
- Seat: Czastary

Area
  - Total: 62.67 km^{2} (24.20 sq mi)

Population (2006)
  - Total: 4,041
  - Density: 64.48/km^{2} (167.0/sq mi)
- Time zone: UTC+1 (CET)
  - Summer (DST): UTC+2 (CEST)
- Website: www.czastary.pl

Gmina Czastary is a rural gmina (administrative district) in Wieruszów County, Łódź Voivodeship, in central Poland. Its seat is the village of Czastary, which lies approximately 13 kilometres (8 mi) east of Wieruszów and 99 km (62 mi) south-west of the regional capital Łódź.

The gmina covers an area of 62.67 square kilometres (24.2 sq mi), and as of 2006 its total population is 4,041.

== Villages ==
Gmina Czastary contains the villages and settlements of:

- Chorobel
- Czastary
- Dolina
- Jaworek
- Józefów
- Kąty
- Kniatowy
- Krajanka
- Krzyż
- Nalepa
- Parcice
- Przywory
- Radostów Drugi
- Radostów Pierwszy
- Stępna

== Neighbouring gminas ==
Gmina Czastary is bordered by the gminas of Biała, Bolesławiec, Łubnice, Sokolniki and Wieruszów.
