= Brzeziny, Wieruszów County =

Brzeziny
- Village
- Location within Poland
- Coordinates: 51°26′8″N 18°12′5″E
- Country: Poland
- Voivodeship: Łódź
- County: Wieruszów
- Gmina: Galewice

Brzeziny [bʐɛˈʑinɨ] is a village in the administrative district of Gmina Galewice, within Wieruszów County, Łódź Voivodeship, in central Poland.
