= Cieszęcin =

- Village
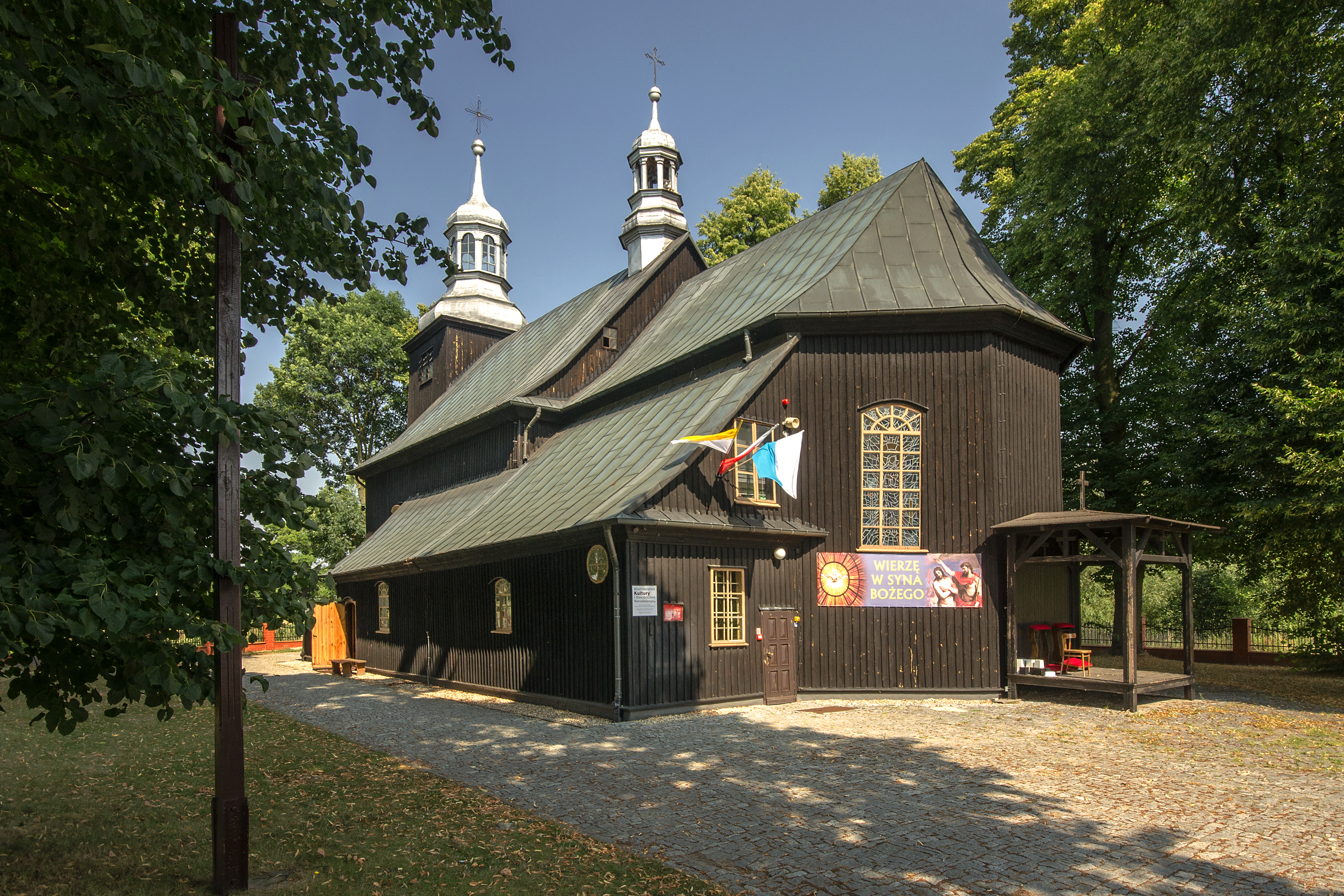
- Church of Saint Adalbert

- Location within Poland
- Coordinates: 51°20′N 18°11′E
- Country: Poland
- Voivodeship: Łódź
- County: Wieruszów
- Gmina: Wieruszów

Cieszęcin [t͡ɕɛˈʂɛnt͡ɕin] is a village in the administrative district of Gmina Wieruszów, within Wieruszów County, Łódź Voivodeship, in central Poland.
