= Sopel =

Sopel may refer to:

- Brent Sopel (born 1977), Canadian professional hockey player
- Jon Sopel (journalist) (born 1959), English television presenter and correspondent
- Sopel, Łódź Voivodeship, a village in Poland
- LSPZRA Sopel, a prototype Polish self-propelled anti-aircraft gun (SPAAG)
