= Chorobel =

- Settlement
- Location within Poland
- Coordinates: 51°14′28″N 18°20′57″E
- Country: Poland
- Voivodeship: Łódź
- County: Wieruszów
- Gmina: Czastary

Chorobel [xɔˈrɔbɛl] is a settlement in the administrative district of Gmina Czastary, within Wieruszów County, Łódź Voivodeship, in central Poland.
