= Mesznary =

- Village
- Location within Poland
- Coordinates: 51°16′45″N 18°09′52″E
- Country: Poland
- Voivodeship: Łódź
- County: Wieruszów
- Gmina: Wieruszów

Mesznary [mɛʂˈnarɨ] is a village in the administrative district of Gmina Wieruszów, within Wieruszów County, Łódź Voivodeship, in central Poland.
