= Niwiska =

Niwiska may refer to the following places:

- Niwiska, Łódź Voivodeship (central Poland)
- Niwiska, Lubusz Voivodeship (west Poland)
- Niwiska, Podkarpackie Voivodeship (south-east Poland)
