= Polesie, Wieruszów County =

Polesie
- Village
- Location within Poland
- Coordinates: 51°19′5″N 18°10′57″E
- Country: Poland
- Voivodeship: Łódź
- County: Wieruszów
- Gmina: Wieruszów
- Population: 140

Polesie [pɔˈlɛɕɛ] is a village in the administrative district of Gmina Wieruszów, within Wieruszów County, Łódź Voivodeship, in central Poland.
