= Kaski, Łódź Voivodeship =

Kaski
- Village
- Location within Poland
- Coordinates: 51°20′24″N 18°17′56″E
- Country: Poland
- Voivodeship: Łódź
- County: Wieruszów
- Gmina: Galewice

Kaski [ˈkaski] is a village in the administrative district of Gmina Galewice, within Wieruszów County, Łódź Voivodeship, in central Poland.
