= Żelazo =

Żelazo may refer to:

- Żelazo, Łódź Voivodeship, Poland
- Żelazo, Pomeranian Voivodeship, Poland
