= Kużaj =

- Village
- Location within Poland
- Coordinates: 51°21′46″N 18°18′43″E
- Country: Poland
- Voivodeship: Łódź
- County: Wieruszów
- Gmina: Galewice

Kużaj ([ˈkuʐai̯]) is a village in the administrative district of Gmina Galewice, within Wieruszów County, Łódź Voivodeship, in central Poland.
