= Spóle =

- Village
- Location within Poland
- Coordinates: 51°24′N 18°13′E
- Country: Poland
- Voivodeship: Łódź
- County: Wieruszów
- Gmina: Galewice
- Population: 260

Spóle [ˈspulɛ] is a village in the administrative district of Gmina Galewice, within Wieruszów County, Łódź Voivodeship, in central Poland.
