= Mirków, Łódź Voivodeship =

Mirków
- Village
- Location within Poland
- Coordinates: 51°18′57″N 18°09′12″E
- Country: Poland
- Voivodeship: Łódź
- County: Wieruszów
- Gmina: Wieruszów
- Population: 800

Mirków [ˈmirkuf] is a village in the administrative district of Gmina Wieruszów, within Wieruszów County, Łódź Voivodeship, in central Poland.
