= Dąbrówka, Wieruszów County =

Dąbrówka
- Village
- Location within Poland
- Coordinates: 51°21′2″N 18°18′12″E
- Country: Poland
- Voivodeship: Łódź
- County: Wieruszów
- Gmina: Galewice
- Population: 50

Dąbrówka [dɔmˈbrufka] is a village in the administrative district of Gmina Galewice, within Wieruszów County, Łódź Voivodeship, in central Poland.
