= Teklinów, Łódź Voivodeship =

Teklinów
- Village
- Location within Poland
- Coordinates: 51°19′48″N 18°7′5″E
- Country: Poland
- Voivodeship: Łódź
- County: Wieruszów
- Gmina: Wieruszów

Teklinów [tɛˈklinuf] is a village in the administrative district of Gmina Wieruszów, within Wieruszów County, Łódź Voivodeship, in central Poland.
