= Gąszcze =

- Village
- Location within Poland
- Coordinates: 51°23′10″N 18°17′47″E
- Country: Poland
- Voivodeship: Łódź
- County: Wieruszów
- Gmina: Galewice

Gąszcze [ˈɡɔ̃ʂt͡ʂɛ] is a village in the administrative district of Gmina Galewice, within Wieruszów County, Łódź Voivodeship, in central Poland.
