= Kąty, Wieruszów County =

Kąty
- Village
- Location within Poland
- Coordinates: 51°17′32″N 18°21′30″E
- Country: Poland
- Voivodeship: Łódź
- County: Wieruszów
- Gmina: Czastary

Kąty [ˈkɔntɨ] is a village in the administrative district of Gmina Czastary, within Wieruszów County, Łódź Voivodeship, in central Poland.
