= Grądy, Wieruszów County =

Grądy
- Village
- Location within Poland
- Coordinates: 51°23′23″N 18°12′40″E
- Country: Poland
- Voivodeship: Łódź
- County: Wieruszów
- Gmina: Galewice

Grądy [ˈɡrɔndɨ] is a village in the administrative district of Gmina Galewice, within Wieruszów County, Łódź Voivodeship, in central Poland.
