= Skakawa =

- Village
- Location within Poland
- Coordinates: 51°16′19″N 18°6′39″E
- Country: Poland
- Voivodeship: Łódź
- County: Wieruszów
- Gmina: Wieruszów

Skakawa [skaˈkava] is a village in the administrative district of Gmina Wieruszów, within Wieruszów County, Łódź Voivodeship, in central Poland.
