= Krzyż, Łódź Voivodeship =

Krzyż
- Village
- Location within Poland
- Coordinates: 51°14′1″N 18°21′21″E
- Country: Poland
- Voivodeship: Łódź
- County: Wieruszów
- Gmina: Czastary

Krzyż [kʂɨʂ] is a village in the administrative district of Gmina Czastary, within Wieruszów County, Łódź Voivodeship, in central Poland.
