= Rzepisko, Łódź Voivodeship =

Rzepisko
- Village
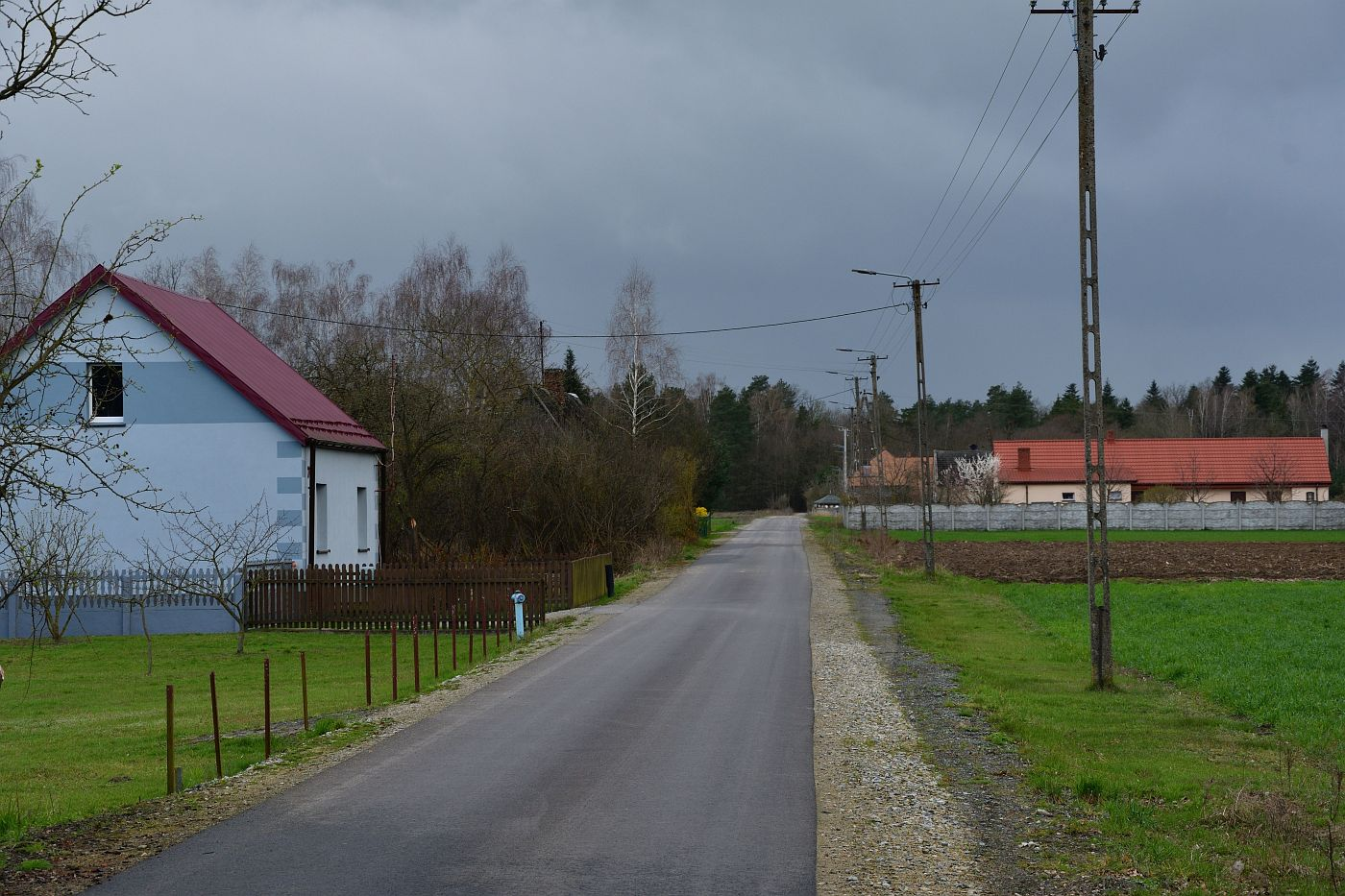
- Rzepisko in 2024.

- Location within Poland
- Coordinates: 51°12′17″N 18°17′07″E
- Country: Poland
- Voivodeship: Łódź
- County: Wieruszów
- Municipality: Łubnice
- Time zone: UTC+1 (CET)
  - Summer (DST): UTC+2 (CEST)
- Postal code: 98-432
- Area code: +48 62
- Car plates: EWE

Rzepisko (Polish: [ʐɛˈpis.kɔ]) is a village in Łódź Voivodeship, Poland, located within the municipality of Łubnice in Wieruszów County.
