= Przywory, Łódź Voivodeship =

Przywory
- Village
- Location within Poland
- Coordinates: 51°16′12″N 18°15′1″E
- Country: Poland
- Voivodeship: Łódź
- County: Wieruszów
- Gmina: Czastary

Przywory [pʂɨˈvɔrɨ] is a village in the administrative district of Gmina Czastary, within Wieruszów County, Łódź Voivodeship, in central Poland.
