= Kowalówka =

Kowalówka may refer to the following places:

- Kowalówka, Łódź Voivodeship (central Poland)
- Kowalówka, Masovian Voivodeship (east-central Poland)
- Kowalówka, Subcarpathian Voivodeship (south-east Poland)
