= Galewice =

- Village
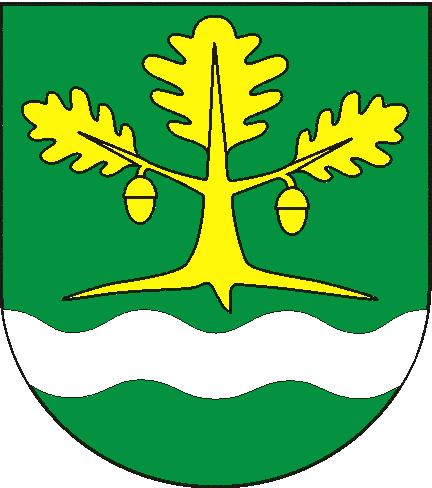
- Coat of Arms of Galewice Commune

- Location within Poland
- Coordinates: 51°20′42″N 18°15′29″E
- Country: Poland
- Voivodeship: Lodzkie
- County: Wieruszów
- Gmina: Galewice
- Established: 15th century
- Population (2011): 1,443
- Time zone: UTC+1 (CET)
  - Summer (DST): UTC+2 (CEST)
- Postal code: 98-405
- Area code: +48 62
- Car plates: EWE
- Climate: Cfb
- Website: https://www.galewice.pl

Galewice [ɡalɛˈvit͡sɛ] is a village in central Poland in Wieruszów County, Łódź Voivodeship, established in the 15th century. It was first mentioned in 1458 in Judicial Chronicles. The origin of the name Galewice is ambiguous. It either comes from a word Gal, which means 'to serve' or it belonged to the first owners of the village, an aristocratic family of Galewski (coat of arms Wierusz). It is the seat of the administrative district of Gmina Galewice.

== History and government ==
Galewice was first mentioned in 1458 in Judicial Chronicles and was owned by an aristocratic family of Galewski (coat of arms Wierusz). According to the statistics for the years 1633-1635 Galewice was the second most important settlement on the ancient route between Ostrzeszów and Wieruszów. When Poland was partitioned in 1795 Galewice fell under the Russian occupation. In 1815 it became part of the Congress Poland. Until 1885 the village was owned by the Myszkowski family, when it was bought by Kazimierz Czapski. The Czapski family held the court in Galewice and owned most of the village until the World War II in 1939.

After 1918, when Poland gained independence, Galewice became the host of Gmina Galewice and in 1933 Roman Catholic Church parish (Parafia p.w. Najswietszego Serca Pana Jezusa / the Holiest Heart of Lord Jesus Parish) was established. During World War II it was the place of a labour camp for Jews from Wieruszów County.

Since the Second World War Galewice has remained the seat of Gmina Galewice, firstly in the Łódź Voivodeship, and between 1975 and 1998 as part of the Kalisz Voivodeship. After the reforms of the units of administrative division and local government in 1998, Galewice has returned to the Łódź Voivodeship.

== Culture and sport ==
In the mid-nineteenth century Antoni Myszkowski built on a hill a neo-classicist court and established a Court Park with trees, such as Robinia pseudoacacia, Douglas fir, Carpinus betulus, Populus alba, and blue spruce. The court after the Second World War became the host to the primary school and most recently to the nursery. In 2012 a major restoration of the court park was carried out, with new pathways laid out and street lightning fitted in.

The most popular sporting activity in Galewice is football. There are two football clubs:

- LKS Orzeł Galewice - an amateur football club
- Gal-Gaz Galewice - a semi-professional football club with adult and children sections. The children football club is known as UKS Gal-Gaz Galewice.

Cultural life of Galewice revolves around and is mostly organized by the Cultural Centre (Gminny Ośrodek Kultury), the Volunteer Fire Department (Ochotnicza Straż Pożarna), the parish and local schools.
