= Nalepa =

Nalepa may refer to:

== People ==
- Alfred Nalepa (1856–1929), Austrian zoologist
- Irena Nalepa (born 1951), Polish biochemist
- Michał Nalepa (footballer, born 1993), Polish football player
- Michał Nalepa (footballer, born 1995), Polish football player
- Maciej Nalepa (born 1978), Polish football player
- Tadeusz Nalepa (1943–2007), Polish composer, guitar player, vocalist and lyricist

== Places ==
- Nalepa, Łódź Voivodeship, a settlement in the administrative district of Gmina Czastary, within Wieruszów County, Łódź Voivodeship, Poland
