= Kostrzewy, Łódź Voivodeship =

Kostrzewy
- Village
- Location within Poland
- Coordinates: 51°20′22″N 18°13′11″E
- Country: Poland
- Voivodeship: Łódź
- County: Wieruszów
- Gmina: Galewice
- Population: 50

Kostrzewy [kɔsˈtʂɛvɨ] is a village in the administrative district of Gmina Galewice, within Wieruszów County, Łódź Voivodeship, in central Poland.
