= Osiek, Wieruszów County =

Osiek
- Village
- Location within Poland
- Coordinates: 51°22′7″N 18°12′0″E
- Country: Poland
- Voivodeship: Łódź
- County: Wieruszów
- Gmina: Galewice
- Population: 980

Osiek [ˈɔɕɛk] is a village in the administrative district of Gmina Galewice, within Wieruszów County, Łódź Voivodeship, in central Poland.
