= Klatka =

Klatka may refer to the following places:

- Klatka, Greater Poland Voivodeship (west-central Poland)
- Klatka, Łódź Voivodeship (central Poland)
- Klatka, Podlaskie Voivodeship (north-east Poland)
