= Pędziwiatry =

- Village
- Location within Poland
- Coordinates: 51°22′N 18°17′E
- Country: Poland
- Voivodeship: Łódź
- County: Wieruszów
- Gmina: Galewice

Pędziwiatry [pɛnd͡ʑiˈvjatrɨ] is a village in the administrative district of Gmina Galewice, within Wieruszów County, Łódź Voivodeship, in central Poland.
