= Ludwinów, Wieruszów County =

Ludwinów
- Village
- Location within Poland
- Coordinates: 51°11′N 18°17′E
- Country: Poland
- Voivodeship: Łódź
- County: Wieruszów
- Gmina: Łubnice

Ludwinów [ludˈvinuf] is a village in the administrative district of Gmina Łubnice, within Wieruszów County, Łódź Voivodeship, in central Poland.
