= Konaty =

- Village
- Location within Poland
- Coordinates: 51°22′58″N 18°18′16″E
- Country: Poland
- Voivodeship: Łódź
- County: Wieruszów
- Gmina: Galewice

Konaty [kɔˈnatɨ] is a village in the administrative district of Gmina Galewice, within Wieruszów County, Łódź Voivodeship, in central Poland.
