= Kaźmirów =

- Village
- Location within Poland
- Coordinates: 51°22′01″N 18°17′42″E
- Country: Poland
- Voivodeship: Łódź
- County: Wieruszów
- Gmina: Galewice

Kaźmirów [kaʑˈmiruf] is a village in the administrative district of Gmina Galewice, within Wieruszów County, Łódź Voivodeship, in central Poland.
