= Gmina Łubnice =

Gmina Łubnice may refer to either of the following rural administrative districts in Poland:

- Gmina Łubnice, Świętokrzyskie Voivodeship
- Gmina Łubnice, Łódź Voivodeship
