= Krojanker =

Krojanker, Kroyanker, Krojanski, Krojansky, Krajenski, Krajensky, Krajeski are toponymic surnames ("-er": Germain/Yiddish, "-ski": Polish, "-sky": transliterated Polish) derived from the German name Krojanke for Polish locations Krajanka or Krajenka. Notable people with the surnames include:

- David Kroyanker (born 1939), Israeli architect and architectural historian
- Thomas C. Krajeski (born 1950), American diplomat

== Fictional characters ==
- Ambassador Krajensky from Star Trek, e.g., in Dominion
