= Chobanin =

- Village
- Location within Poland
- Coordinates: 51°18′N 18°13′E
- Country: Poland
- Voivodeship: Łódź
- County: Wieruszów
- Gmina: Wieruszów
- Time zone: UTC+1 (CET)
  - Summer (DST): UTC+2 (CEST)
- Vehicle registration: EWE

Chobanin [xɔˈbanin] is a village in the administrative district of Gmina Wieruszów, within Wieruszów County, Łódź Voivodeship, in central Poland.

During the German invasion of Poland, which started World War II, in September 1939, the Germans murdered several local Poles in revenge for the Polish defense (see Nazi crimes against the Polish nation).
