= Osowa (disambiguation) =

Osowa is a district of Gdańsk, Poland.

Osowa may also refer to the following places:

- Osowa, Lublin County in Lublin Voivodeship (east Poland)
- Osowa, Podlaskie Voivodeship (north-east Poland)
- Osowa, Łódź Voivodeship (central Poland)
- Osowa, Włodawa County in Lublin Voivodeship (east Poland)
- Osowa, Świętokrzyskie Voivodeship (south-central Poland)
- Osowa, Masovian Voivodeship (east-central Poland)
