= Kuźnica Skakawska =

- Village
- Location within Poland
- Coordinates: 51°16′40″N 18°8′8″E
- Country: Poland
- Voivodeship: Łódź
- County: Wieruszów
- Gmina: Wieruszów

Kuźnica Skakawska (Polish pronunciation: [kuʑˈɲit͡sa skaˈkafska]) is a village in the administrative district of Gmina Wieruszów, within Wieruszów County, Łódź Voivodeship, in central Poland.
