= Dzietrzkowice =

- Village
- Location within Poland
- Coordinates: 51°10′N 18°19′E
- Country: Poland
- Voivodeship: Łódź
- County: Wieruszów
- Gmina: Łubnice
- Population (approx.): 1,000

Dzietrzkowice [d͡ʑɛtʂkɔˈvit͡sɛ] is a village in the administrative district of Gmina Łubnice, within Wieruszów County, Łódź Voivodeship, in central Poland.

The village has an approximate population of 1,000.
