= Grzeska =

Grzeska may refer to:

- Grześka, Łódź Voivodeship, Poland
- Grzęska, Subcarpathian Voivodeship, Poland
