= Gmina Galewice =

Gmina Galewice Galewice Commune
- Gmina
- Flag Coat of arms
- Interactive map of Gmina Galewice
- Coordinates (Galewice): 51°20′42″N 18°15′29″E
- Country: Poland
- Voivodeship: Łódź
- County: Wieruszów
- Seat: Galewice

Area
  - Total: 135.79 km^{2} (52.43 sq mi)

Population (2011)
  - Total: 6,244
  - Density: 45.98/km^{2} (119.1/sq mi)
- Time zone: UTC+1 (CET)
  - Summer (DST): UTC+2 (CEST)
- Website: galewice.pl

Gmina Galewice is a rural gmina (administrative district) in Wieruszów County, Łódź Voivodeship, in central Poland. Its seat is the village of Galewice, which lies approximately 10 kilometres (6 mi) north-east of Wieruszów and 97 km (60 mi) south-west of the regional capital Łódź.

The gmina covers an area of 135.79 square kilometres (52.4 sq mi), and as of 2011 its total population was 6,244.

== Villages ==
Gmina Galewice contains the villages and settlements of:

- Biadaszki
- Brzeziny
- Brzózki
- Dąbie
- Dąbrówka
- Foluszczyki
- Galewice
- Gąszcze
- Grądy
- Jeziorna
- Kaski
- Kaźmirów
- Konaty
- Kostrzewy
- Kużaj
- Niwiska
- Okoń
- Osiek
- Osowa
- Ostrówek
- Pędziwiatry
- Plęsy
- Przybyłów
- Rybka Lututowska
- Rybka Sokolska
- Spóle
- Węglewice
- Załozie
- Żelazo

== Neighbouring gminas ==
Gmina Galewice is bordered by the gminas of Czajków, Doruchów, Grabów nad Prosną, Klonowa, Lututów, Sokolniki and Wieruszów.
