= Górka Wieruszowska =

- Village
- Location within Poland
- Coordinates: 51°17′47″N 18°11′7″E
- Country: Poland
- Voivodeship: Łódź
- County: Wieruszów
- Gmina: Wieruszów
- Population: 160

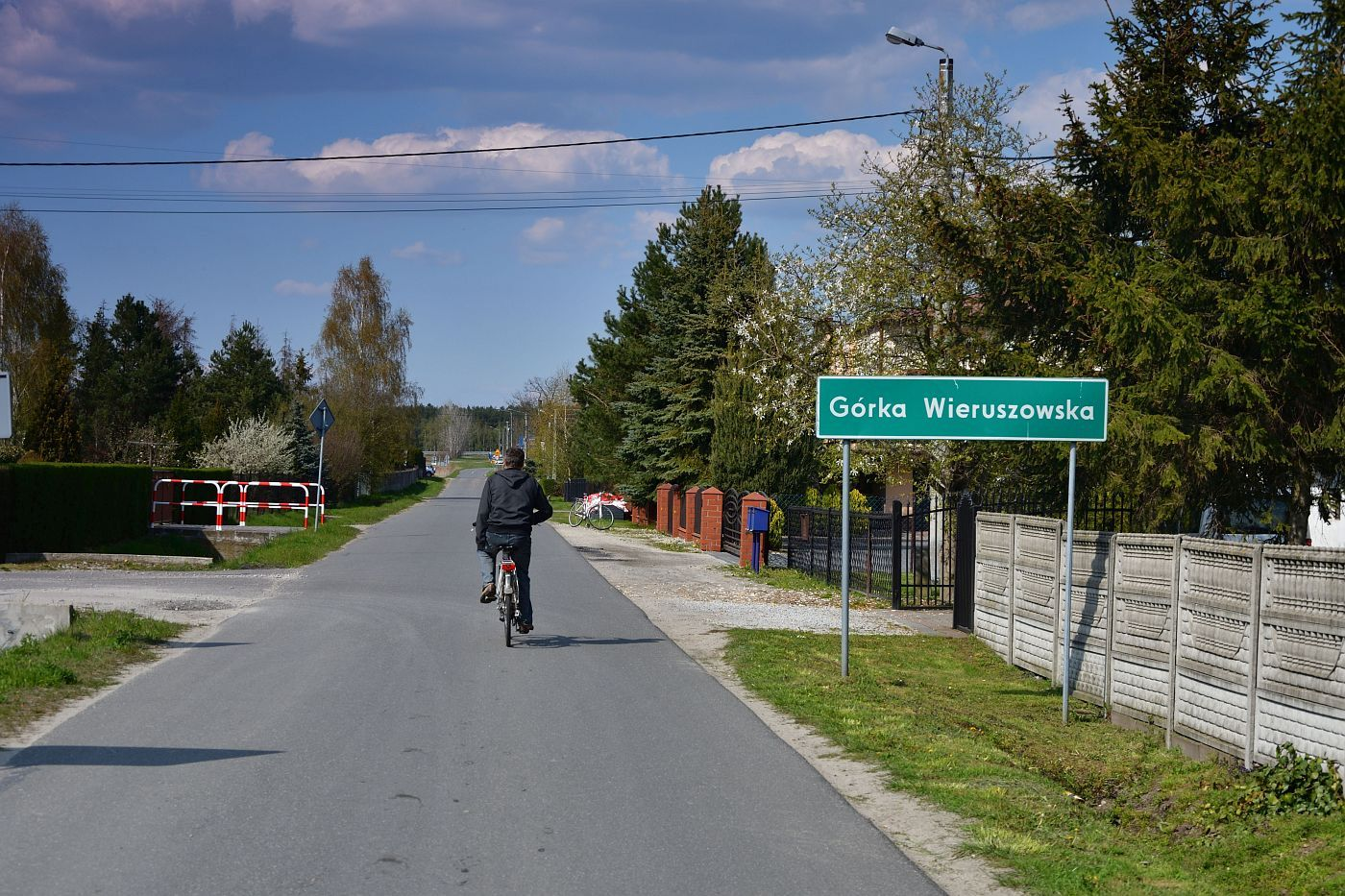
Górka Wieruszowska in 2022

Górka Wieruszowska [ˈɡurka vjɛruˈʂɔfska] is a village in the administrative district of Gmina Wieruszów, within Wieruszów County, Łódź Voivodeship, in central Poland.
