= Załozie =

- Village
- Location within Poland
- Coordinates: 51°24′55″N 18°13′14″E
- Country: Poland
- Voivodeship: Łódź
- County: Wieruszów
- Gmina: Galewice

Załozie [zaˈwɔʑɛ] is a village in the administrative district of Gmina Galewice, within Wieruszów County, Łódź Voivodeship, in central Poland.
