= Mieleszynek =

- Village
- Location within Poland
- Coordinates: 51°15′48″N 18°12′25″E
- Country: Poland
- Voivodeship: Łódź
- County: Wieruszów
- Gmina: Wieruszów
- Population: 164

Mieleszynek [mjɛlɛˈʂɨnɛk] is a village in the administrative district of Gmina Wieruszów, within Wieruszów County, Łódź Voivodeship, in central Poland.

== Geography ==
Mieleszynek is located in the polish lowlands, offering a rich soil for agricultural production. The terrain's elevation ranges from 150 to 180 meters above sea level.
