= Józefów, Wieruszów County =

Józefów
- Village
- Location within Poland
- Coordinates: 51°16′35″N 18°20′1″E
- Country: Poland
- Voivodeship: Łódź
- County: Wieruszów
- Gmina: Czastary

Józefów (Polish pronunciation: [juˈzɛfuf]) is a village in the administrative district of Gmina Czastary, within Wieruszów County, Łódź Voivodeship, in central Poland.
