= Jeziorna, Łódź Voivodeship =

Jeziorna
- Village
- Location within Poland
- Coordinates: 51°22′33″N 18°13′46″E
- Country: Poland
- Voivodeship: Łódź
- County: Wieruszów
- Gmina: Galewice

Jeziorna [jɛˈʑɔrna] is a village in the administrative district of Gmina Galewice, within Wieruszów County, Łódź Voivodeship, in central Poland.
