= Biadaszki =

Biadaszki may refer to the following places:

- Biadaszki, Kępno County in Greater Poland Voivodeship (west-central Poland)
- Biadaszki, Gmina Odolanów, Ostrów County in Greater Poland Voivodeship (west-central Poland)
- Biadaszki, Łódź Voivodeship (central Poland)
