= Wójcin, Wieruszów County =

Wójcin
- Village
- Location within Poland
- Coordinates: 51°10′N 18°15′E
- Country: Poland
- Voivodeship: Łódź
- County: Wieruszów
- Gmina: Łubnice

Wójcin [ˈvui̯t͡ɕin] is a village in the administrative district of Gmina Łubnice, within Wieruszów County, Łódź Voivodeship, in central Poland.
