= Okoń, Łódź Voivodeship =

Okoń
- Village
- Location within Poland
- Coordinates: 51°23′15″N 18°13′52″E
- Country: Poland
- Voivodeship: Łódź
- County: Wieruszów
- Gmina: Galewice
- Population: 130

Okoń [ˈɔkɔɲ] is a village in the administrative district of Gmina Galewice, within Wieruszów County, Łódź Voivodeship, in central Poland.
