= Dobrydział =

- Village
- Location within Poland
- Coordinates: 51°17′2″N 18°7′36″E
- Country: Poland
- Voivodeship: Łódź
- County: Wieruszów
- Gmina: Wieruszów

Dobrydział [dɔˈbrɨd͡ʑau̯] is a village in the administrative district of Gmina Wieruszów, within Wieruszów County, Łódź Voivodeship, in central Poland.
