= Plęsy, Łódź Voivodeship =

Plęsy
- Village
- Location within Poland
- Coordinates: 51°25′23″N 18°13′12″E
- Country: Poland
- Voivodeship: Łódź
- County: Wieruszów
- Gmina: Galewice

Plęsy [ˈplɛ̃sɨ] is a village in the administrative district of Gmina Galewice, within Wieruszów County, Łódź Voivodeship, in central Poland.
