= Dąbie, Wieruszów County =

Dąbie
- Village
- Location within Poland
- Coordinates: 51°20′38″N 18°19′33″E
- Country: Poland
- Voivodeship: Łódź
- County: Wieruszów
- Gmina: Galewice

Dąbie [ˈdɔmbjɛ] is a village in the administrative district of Gmina Galewice, within Wieruszów County, Łódź Voivodeship, in central Poland.
