= Żelazo, Łódź Voivodeship =

Żelazo
- Village
- Location within Poland
- Coordinates: 51°23′55″N 18°19′24″E
- Country: Poland
- Voivodeship: Łódź
- County: Wieruszów
- Gmina: Galewice
- Area: 8.570 km^{2} (3.309 sq mi)
- Population: 62

Żelazo [ʐɛˈlazɔ] is a village in the administrative district of Gmina Galewice, within Wieruszów County, Łódź Voivodeship, in central Poland.
