= Łubnice, Łódź Voivodeship =

Łubnice
- Village
- Location within Poland
- Coordinates: 51°9′45″N 18°17′24″E
- Country: Poland
- Voivodeship: Łódź
- County: Wieruszów
- Gmina: Łubnice
- Population (approx.): 1,100
- Website: http://www.uglubnice.com.pl/

Łubnice [wubˈnit͡sɛ] is a village in Wieruszów County, Łódź Voivodeship, in central Poland. It is the seat of the gmina (administrative district) called Gmina Łubnice.

The village has an approximate population of 1,100.

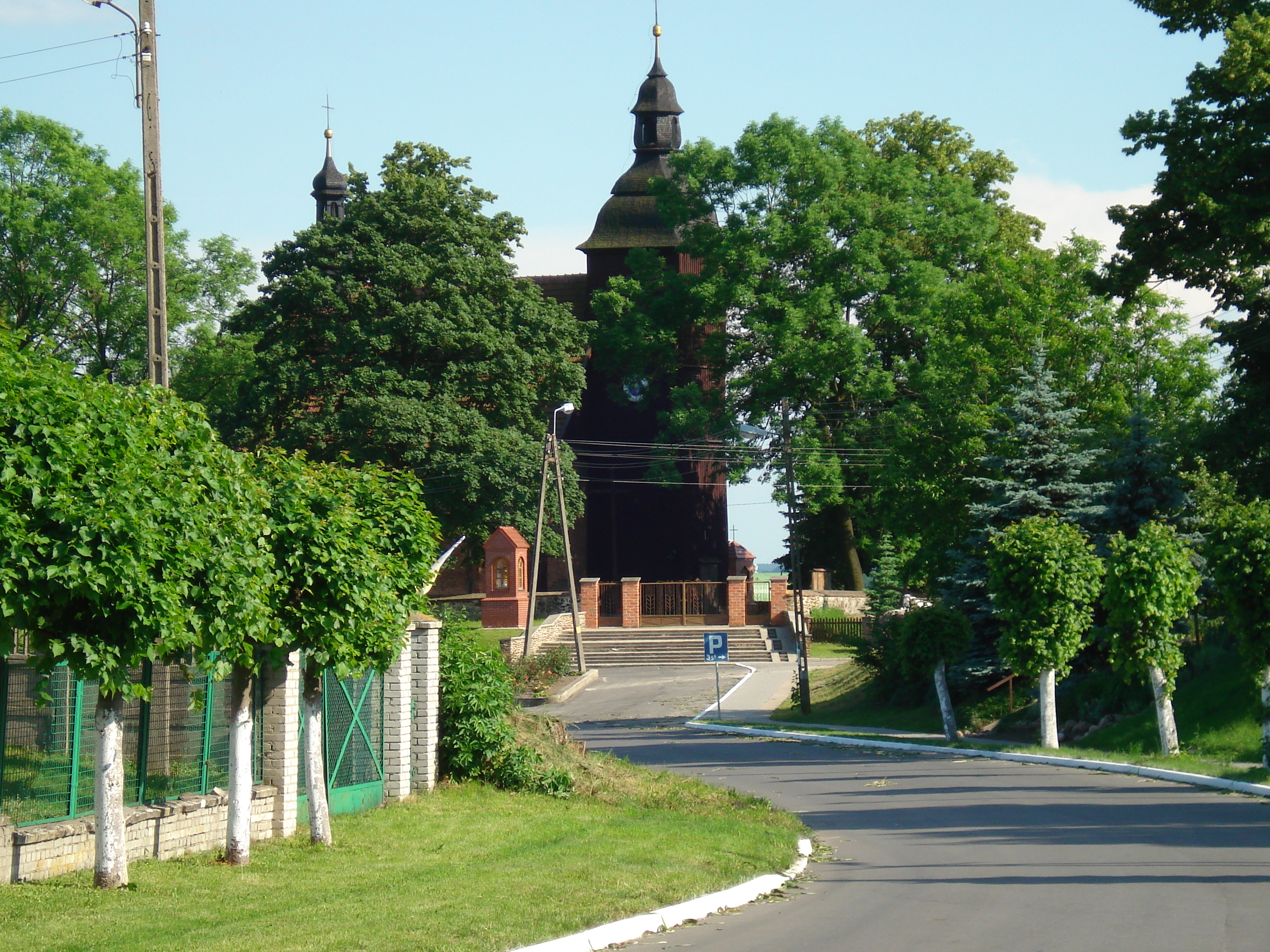
Church in Łubnice
