= Rybka (surname) =

Rybka (Ukrainian: Рибка; Belarusian and Russian Рыбка; Czech/Slovak feminine: Rybková) is a surname meaning "little fish" in Belarusian, Czech, Polish, Russian, Slovak, and Ukrainian. Notable people with the surname include:

- Anastasia Rybka (born 1993), Ukrainian-American table tennis player
- Eugeniusz Rybka (1898–1988), Polish astronomer
- Kurt Rybka, German commander in the 1944 Operation Rösselsprung
- Nastya Rybka - a Belarusian escort worker and author
- Oleksandr Rybka (born 1987), Ukrainian footballer

== See also ==
- Rybak
- Ryba
