= Gmina Wieruszów =

Gmina Wieruszów Wieruszów Commune
- Gmina
- Flag Coat of arms
- Interactive map of Gmina Wieruszów
- Coordinates (Wieruszów): 51°18′N 18°9′E
- Country: Poland
- Voivodeship: Łódź
- County: Wieruszów
- Seat: Wieruszów

Area
  - Total: 97.13 km^{2} (37.50 sq mi)

Population (2006)
  - Total: 14,176
  - Density: 145.9/km^{2} (378.0/sq mi)
  - Urban: 8,759
  - Rural: 5,417
- Website: http://www.wieruszow.info.pl

Gmina Wieruszów is an urban-rural gmina (administrative district) in Wieruszów County, Łódź Voivodeship, in central Poland. Its seat is the town of Wieruszów, which lies approximately 106 kilometres (66 mi) south-west of the regional capital Łódź.

The gmina covers an area of 97.13 square kilometres (37.5 sq mi), and as of 2006 its total population is 14,176 (out of which the population of Wieruszów amounts to 8,759, and the population of the rural part of the gmina is 5,417).

== Villages ==
Apart from the town of Wieruszów, Gmina Wieruszów contains the villages and settlements of Chobanin, Cieszęcin, Dobrydział, Górka Wieruszowska, Grześka, Jutrków, Klatka, Kowalówka, Kuźnica Skakawska, Lubczyna, Mesznary, Mieleszynek, Mirków, Pieczyska, Polesie, Skakawa, Sopel, Teklinów and Wyszanów.

== Neighbouring gminas ==
Gmina Wieruszów is bordered by the gminas of Baranów, Bolesławiec, Czastary, Doruchów, Galewice, Kępno, Łęka Opatowska and Sokolniki.
