= Grześka =

- Village
- Location within Poland
- Coordinates: 51°17′5″N 18°12′38″E
- Country: Poland
- Voivodeship: Łódź
- County: Wieruszów
- Gmina: Wieruszów

Grześka [ˈɡʐɛɕka] is a village in the administrative district of Gmina Wieruszów, within Wieruszów County, Łódź Voivodeship, in central Poland.
