= Klatka, Łódź Voivodeship =

Klatka
- Village
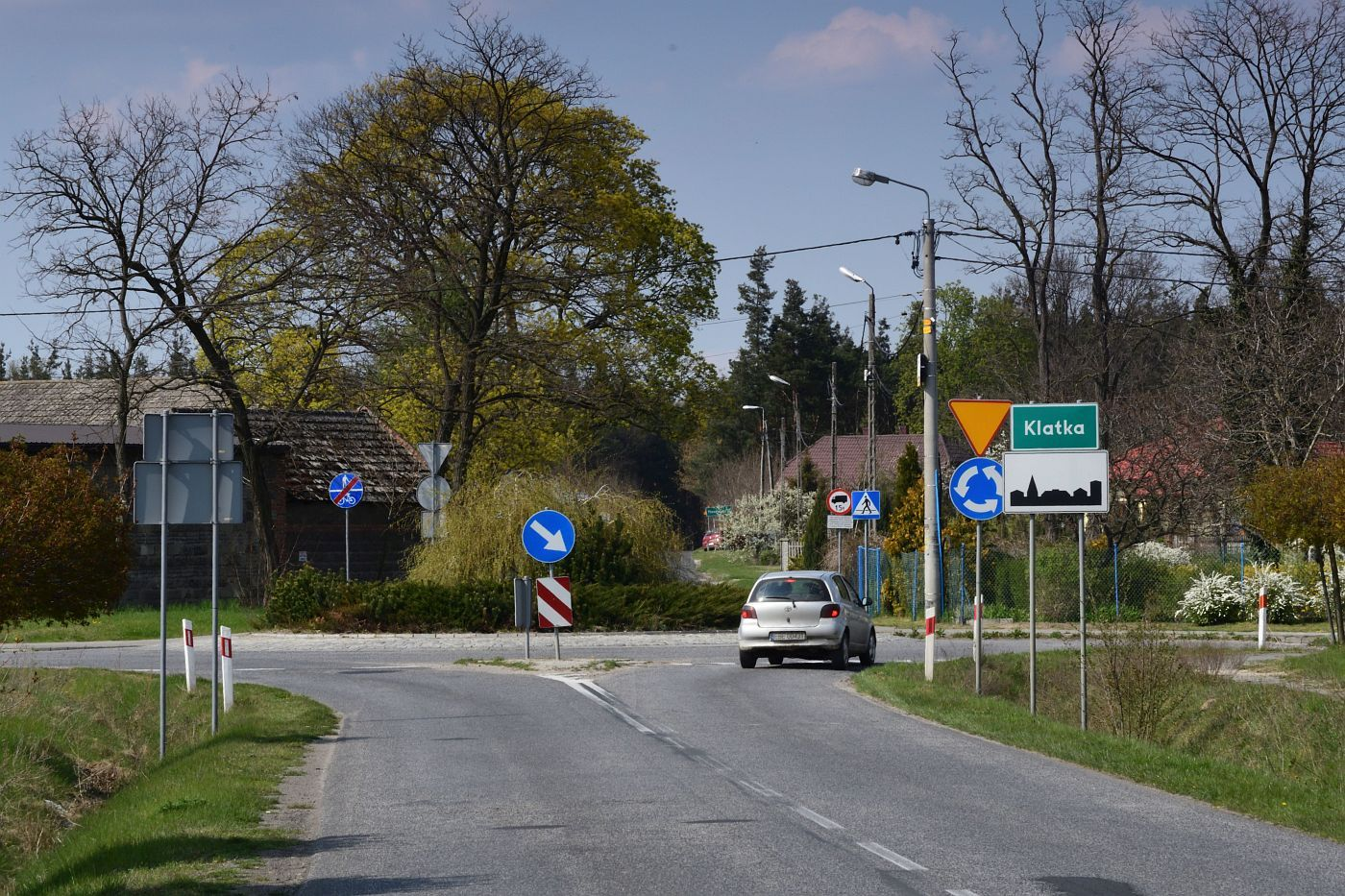

- Location within Poland
- Coordinates: 51°16′31″N 18°11′34″E
- Country: Poland
- Voivodeship: Łódź
- County: Wieruszów
- Gmina: Wieruszów

Klatka [ˈklatka] is a village in the administrative district of Gmina Wieruszów, within Wieruszów County, Łódź Voivodeship, in central Poland.
