= Jaworek, Łódź Voivodeship =

Jaworek
- Village
- Location within Poland
- Coordinates: 51°14′26″N 18°17′20″E
- Country: Poland
- Voivodeship: Łódź
- County: Wieruszów
- Gmina: Czastary

Jaworek [jaˈvɔrɛk] is a village in the administrative district of Gmina Czastary, within Wieruszów County, Łódź Voivodeship, in central Poland.
