= Sopel, Łódź Voivodeship =

Sopel
- Village
- Location within Poland
- Coordinates: 51°19′51″N 18°10′17″E
- Country: Poland
- Voivodeship: Łódź
- County: Wieruszów
- Gmina: Wieruszów

Sopel [ˈsɔpɛl] is a village in the administrative district of Gmina Wieruszów, within Wieruszów County, Łódź Voivodeship, in central Poland.
