= Osowa, Łódź Voivodeship =

Osowa
- Village
- Location within Poland
- Coordinates: 51°19′38″N 18°13′29″E
- Country: Poland
- Voivodeship: Łódź
- County: Wieruszów
- Gmina: Galewice

Osowa [ɔˈsɔva] is a village in the administrative district of Gmina Galewice, within Wieruszów County, Łódź Voivodeship, in central Poland.
