= Czastary =

- Village
- Coat of arms

- Location within Poland
- Coordinates: 51°15′33″N 18°19′10″E
- Country: Poland
- Voivodeship: Łódź
- County: Wieruszów
- Gmina: Czastary
- Population: 1,023
- Website: http://www.czastary.pl

Czastary ([t͡ʂasˈtarɨ]) is a village in Wieruszów County, Łódź Voivodeship, in central Poland. It is the seat of the gmina (administrative district) called Gmina Czastary.
