= Nalepa, Łódź Voivodeship =

Nalepa
- Settlement
- Location within Poland
- Coordinates: 51°15′20″N 18°14′26″E
- Country: Poland
- Voivodeship: Łódź
- County: Wieruszów
- Gmina: Czastary

Nalepa [naˈlɛpa] is a settlement in the administrative district of Gmina Czastary, within Wieruszów County, Łódź Voivodeship, in central Poland.
