= Ostrówek, Wieruszów County =

Ostrówek
- Village
- Location within Poland
- Coordinates: 51°22′3″N 18°18′26″E
- Country: Poland
- Voivodeship: Łódź
- County: Wieruszów
- Gmina: Galewice
- Population (approx.): 410

Ostrówek [ɔsˈtruvɛk] is a village in the administrative district of Gmina Galewice, within Wieruszów County, Łódź Voivodeship, in central Poland.

The village has an approximate population of 410.
