= Brzózki, Łódź Voivodeship =

Brzózki
- Village
- Location within Poland
- Coordinates: 51°23′7″N 18°17′3″E
- Country: Poland
- Voivodeship: Łódź
- County: Wieruszów
- Gmina: Galewice

Brzózki [ˈbʐuski] is a village in the administrative district of Gmina Galewice, within Wieruszów County, Łódź Voivodeship, in central Poland.
