= Friedrich Gollwitzer =

Nazi German general (1889–1977)

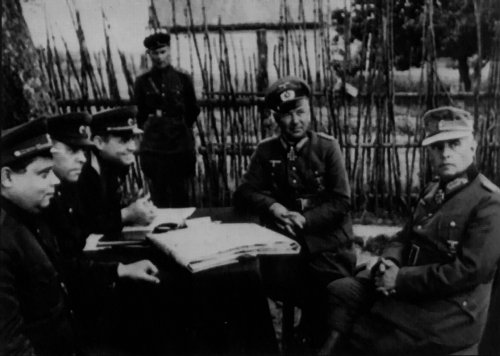
- 206th Infantry Division's commander, Alfons Hitter (second from right) and Gollwitzer surrender to the Soviet forces.
- Born: 27 April 1889
- Died: 25 March 1977 (aged 87)
- Military career
- Allegiance: Nazi Germany
- Branch: Army (Wehrmacht)
- Rank: General of the Infantry
- Commands: 193d Infantry Division; 88th Infantry Division; LIII Army Corps
- Conflicts: World War I; World War II; Annexation of Austria; Invasion of Poland; Battle of France; Second Battle of Kharkov; Battle of Voronezh (1942); Battle of Kursk; Operation Bagration--->; Vitebsk–Orsha Offensive
- Awards: Knight's Cross of the Iron Cross

Friedrich Gollwitzer (27 April 1889 – 25 March 1977) was a general in the Wehrmacht of Nazi Germany who commanded the LIII Army Corps. He was a recipient of the Knight's Cross of the Iron Cross.

With the outbreak of the First World War, Gollwitzer was appointed adjutant of the replacement battalion. In the same position he joined the 2nd Reserve Engineer Battalion in mid-January 1915 and was promoted to lieutenant on 1 June 1915. Gollwitzer ended the war as a captain, awarded both classes of the Iron Cross and the Military Merit Order.

Gollwitzer surrendered to the Soviet troops in June 1944 during the Vitebsk–Orsha Offensive. Convicted as a war criminal in the Soviet Union, he was held until October 1955. In West Germany, Gollwitzer was investigated for war crimes allegedly committed under his command during the 1939 invasion of Poland.

== Allegations of war crimes ==
In 1964 the public prosecutor's office in Amberg (West Germany) started an inquiry against Gollwitzer over his alleged involvement in war crimes. In 1968 Central Office of the State Justice Administrations for the Investigation of National Socialist Crimes in Ludwigsburg received a letter from Ferdinand D. – a Wehrmacht veteran – who accused Gollwitzer of committing several atrocities during the Invasion of Poland in 1939. In his letter the veteran stated that: "activities of 41st Infantry Regiment under the command of Colonel Gollwitzer (...) were nothing less than genocide. Despite the fact that in Poland there were no partisans at that time almost no village from Kalisz to Warsaw had survived because Gollwitzer sparked an obsession with the partisans in his soldiers' minds". In particular, Gollwitzer was accused of ordering the execution of 18 Poles in the village of Torzeniec, which was blamed for the death of three German soldiers (in fact the soldiers were victims of friendly fire). However, the prosecutor's office in Amberg decided to drop the investigation against Gollwitzer.

== Awards ==
- Knight's Cross of the Iron Cross on 8 February 1943 as Generalleutnant and commander of 88. Infanterie-Division

Military offices
Preceded by None	Commander of 193. Infanterie-Division; 29 November 1939 – 2 February 1940	Succeeded by Generalleutnant Werner Sanne
Preceded by Generalmajor Georg Lang	Commander of 88. Infanterie-Division; 2 February 1940 – 10 March 1943	Succeeded by Generalleutnant Heinrich Roth
Preceded by General der Infanterie Heinrich Clößner	Commander of LIII. Armeekorps; 22 June 1943 – 26 June 1944	Succeeded by General der Kavallerie Edwin Graf von Rothkirch und Trach
