= Rybka Lututowska =

- Village
- Location within Poland
- Coordinates: 51°22′18″N 18°20′30″E
- Country: Poland
- Voivodeship: Łódź
- County: Wieruszów
- Gmina: Galewice
- Population: 240

Rybka Lututowska [ˈrɨpka lutuˈtɔfska] is a village in the administrative district of Gmina Galewice, within Wieruszów County, Łódź Voivodeship, in central Poland.
