= Kowalówka, Łódź Voivodeship =

Kowalówka
- Village
- Location within Poland
- Coordinates: 51°20′10″N 18°11′15″E
- Country: Poland
- Voivodeship: Łódź
- County: Wieruszów
- Gmina: Wieruszów

Kowalówka [kɔvaˈlufka] is a village in the administrative district of Gmina Wieruszów, within Wieruszów County, Łódź Voivodeship, in central Poland.
