= Rybka Sokolska =

- Village
- Location within Poland
- Coordinates: 51°22′42″N 18°19′32″E
- Country: Poland
- Voivodeship: Łódź
- County: Wieruszów
- Gmina: Galewice

Rybka Sokolska [ˈrɨpka sɔˈkɔlska] is a village in the administrative district of Gmina Galewice, within Wieruszów County, Łódź Voivodeship, in central Poland.
