= Niwiska, Łódź Voivodeship =

Niwiska
- Village
- Location within Poland
- Coordinates: 51°19′38″N 18°14′49″E
- Country: Poland
- Voivodeship: Łódź
- County: Wieruszów
- Gmina: Galewice

Niwiska [niˈviska] is a village in the administrative district of Gmina Galewice, within Wieruszów County, Łódź Voivodeship, in central Poland.
