= Biadaszki, Łódź Voivodeship =

Biadaszki
- Village
- Location within Poland
- Coordinates: 51°24′0″N 18°16′45″E
- Country: Poland
- Voivodeship: Łódź
- County: Wieruszów
- Gmina: Galewice

Biadaszki [bjaˈdaʂki] is a village in the administrative district of Gmina Galewice, within Wieruszów County, Łódź Voivodeship, in central Poland.
