= Lubczyna, Łódź Voivodeship =

Lubczyna
- Village
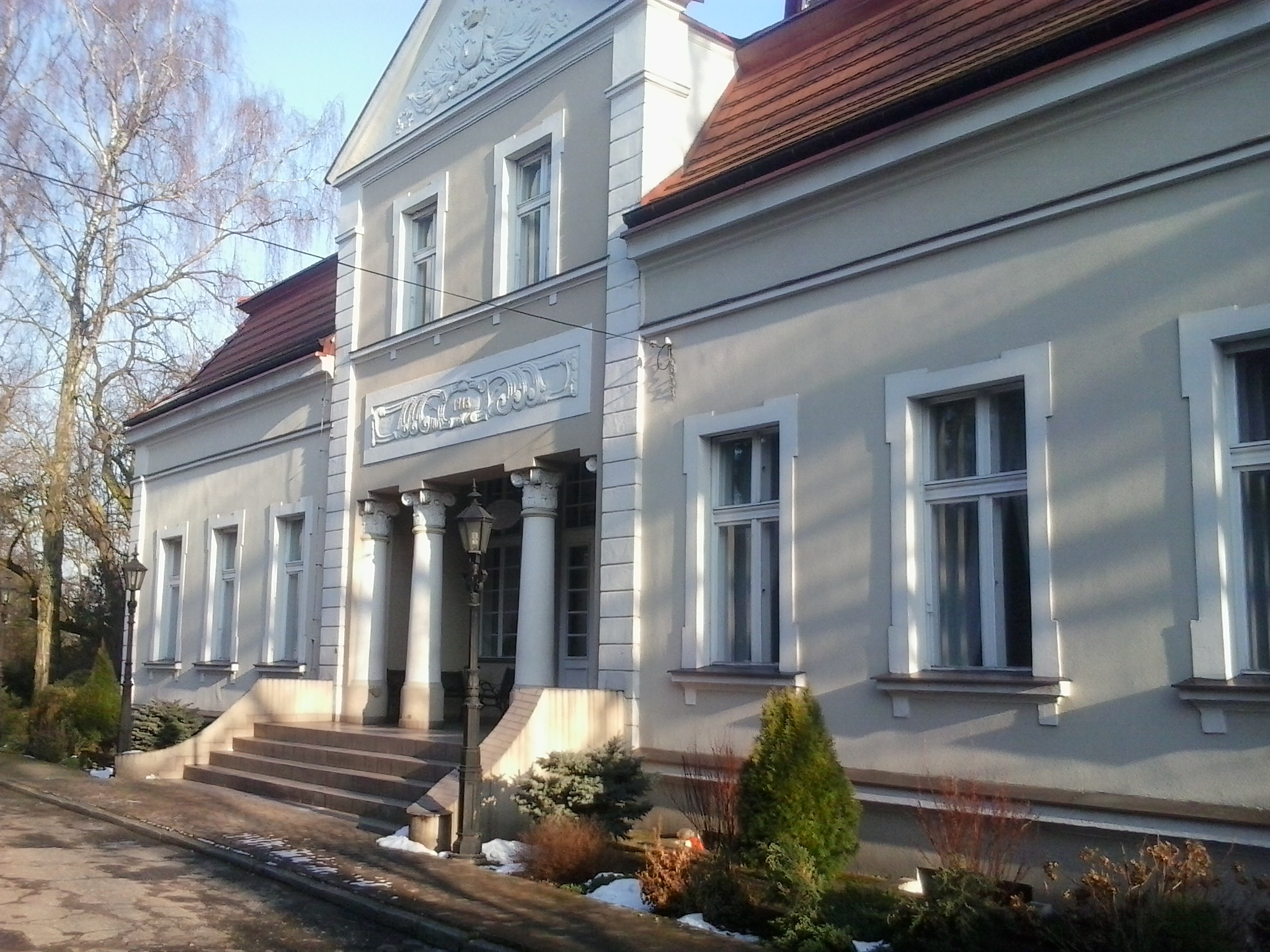
- Palace in Lubczyna

- Location within Poland
- Coordinates: 51°20′40″N 18°9′23″E
- Country: Poland
- Voivodeship: Łódź
- County: Wieruszów
- Gmina: Wieruszów

Lubczyna [lupˈt͡ʂɨna] is a village in the administrative district of Gmina Wieruszów, within Wieruszów County, Łódź Voivodeship, in central Poland.
