= Eugeniusz Rybka =

Polish astronomer (1898–1988)

Eugeniusz Rybka (6 May 1898 in Radzymin – 8 December 1988 in Wrocław), was a Polish astronomer, professor of the University of Lviv (1932–1945), Wrocław University (1945–1958) and director of the Kraków Astronomical Observatory (1958–1968). Also, he was deputy director of the International Astronomical Union (1952–1958).

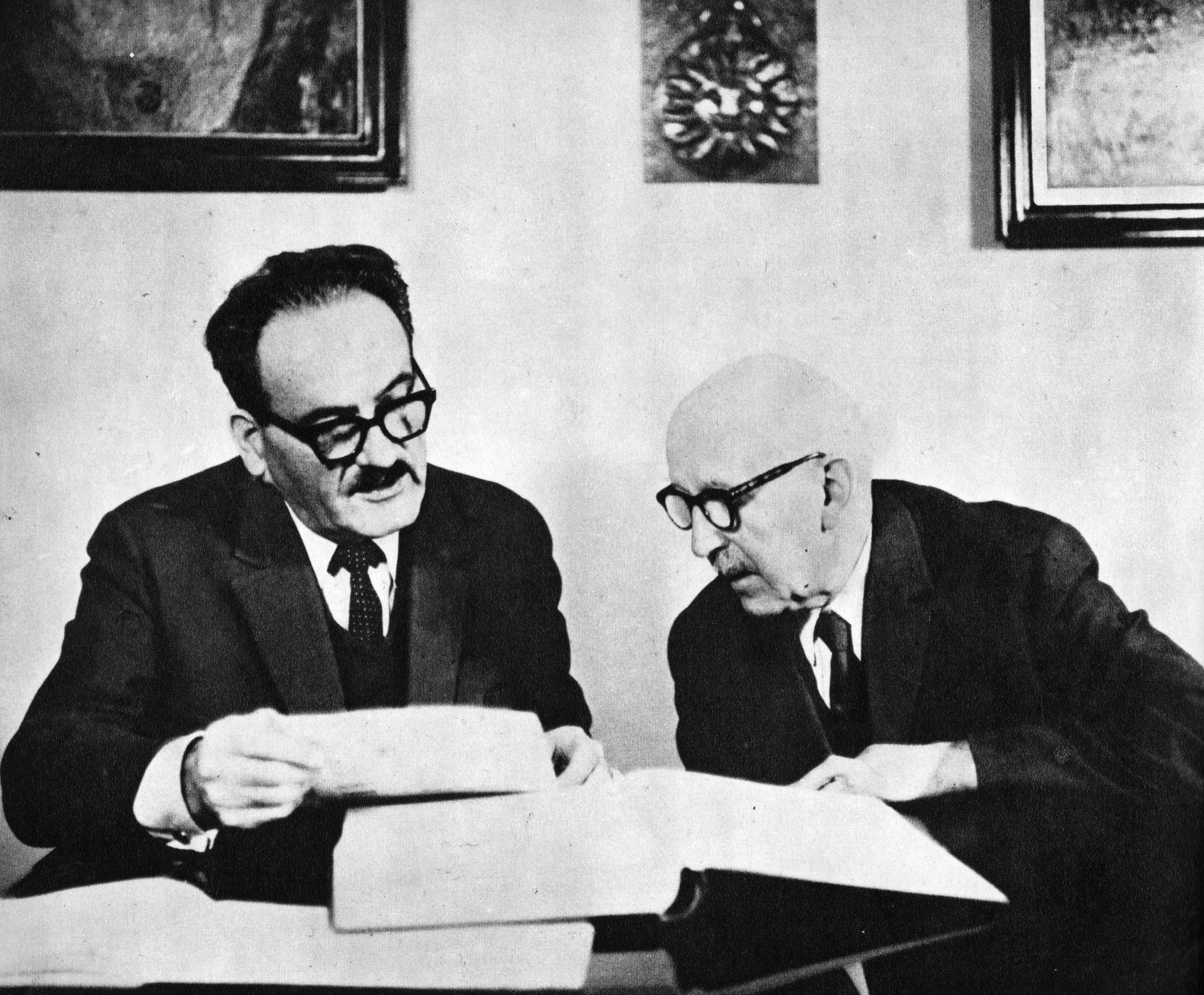
Józej Sałabun (left) and Eugeniusz Rybka, 1973.

== Biography ==
Rybka was the son of a church organ player. In 1900 the family moved to Skierniewice, and then to Ozorków. In 1911, he started middle school in Gostynin, but outbreak of World War I caused him to continue education at home. Rybka graduated on 17 November 1917, and the following year he became commandant of the Ozorków branch of the Polish Military Organization (POW).

In the fall of 1918 Rybka went to Kraków, to study philosophy at the Jagiellonian University. In November of that year, together with a group of patriotic students, he left towards Przemyśl and Lwów, to participate in the Polish-Ukrainian fights there (see: Polish-Ukrainian War). He spent 1919 and 1920 in the Polish Army, serving, among others, in the armored train Nr 53 Smialy. In November 1920, after Polish-Soviet War, Rybka returned to the Jagiellonian University, and began working with professor of astronomy Tadeusz Banachiewicz. This is where his fascination with astronomy originated.

In the fall of 1923 Rybka, together with wife and son, moved to Warsaw, where he worked as an assistant at the Observatory. Three years later he earned a doctorate, writing thesis about observation of stars at the beginning of the twentieth century. In late 1920s, Rybka was preoccupied with examination of Cepheid variables, especially of TU Cas and XZ Cyg.

In 1930 Rybka received a scholarship and went to Leiden, where he worked with a renowned Danish astronomer, professor Einar Hertzsprung. After returning to Poland, he worked on his habilitation, earning the title on 19 January 1932. On 4 February of the same year he became head of the department of astronomy of the University of Lviv and at the same time director of its astronomical observatory. Soon afterwards, he moved to Lwów, where took over Department of Astronomy. A skillful organizer, he wanted to purchase a 90-centimeter telescope for the school, but failed due to outbreak of World War II.

After Soviet Invasion of Poland, and capture of the city by the Red Army, Rybka continued his works at the university. He survived both Soviet and German occupations, but in January 1945 was arrested by the NKVD, together with other Polish professors of the university (Juliusz Makarewicz, Ryszard Gansiniec, Wlodzimierzem Burzynski and Marian Kamienski). Released after a few months, in August 1945 he left Lwów and went to Kraków, to finally settle in Wrocław.

In 1948 he was elected president of the Polish Astronomical Society. In 1949 Rybka revisited Leiden, to work with Jan Oort. He also became a member of the International Astronomical Union, and during a Congress in Rome (1952), he was elected deputy of the organization. In mid-1950s his health deteriorated, he spent long months in various spas, also in 1958, after an argument, he left Wrocław University. The same year he became Chair of Observational Astronomy at Jagiellonian University. From 1958 to 1968 he also served as head of the Cracow Astronomical Observatory. Due to his involvement, the university opened in 1964 its main observatory. Four years later Rybka retired, but continued to take part in various projects, including the IAU.
