= Krajanka =

- Village
- Location within Poland
- Coordinates: 51°15′9″N 18°16′46″E
- Country: Poland
- Voivodeship: Łódź
- County: Wieruszów
- Gmina: Czastary

Krajanka [kraˈjanka] is a village in the administrative district of Gmina Czastary, within Wieruszów County, Łódź Voivodeship, in central Poland.
