= Wyszanów, Łódź Voivodeship =

Wyszanów
- Village
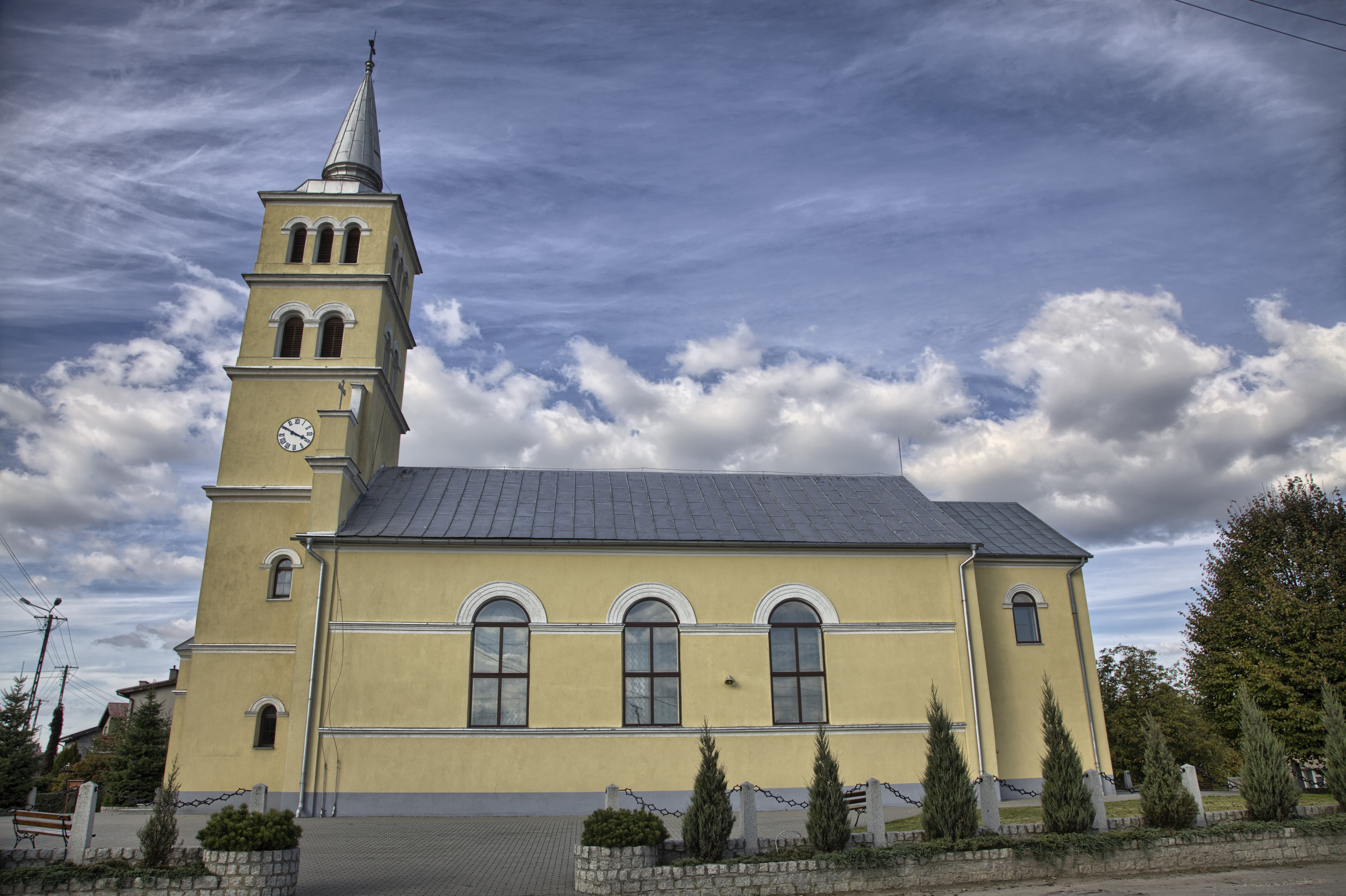
- Church of Saint Michael Archangel

- Location within Poland
- Coordinates: 51°21′30″N 18°9′41″E
- Country: Poland
- Voivodeship: Łódź
- County: Wieruszów
- Gmina: Wieruszów

Population (approx.)
  - Total: 700
- Time zone: UTC+1 (CET)
  - Summer (DST): UTC+2 (CEST)
- Vehicle registration: EWE

Wyszanów [vɨˈʂanuf] is a village in the administrative district of Gmina Wieruszów, within Wieruszów County, Łódź Voivodeship, in central Poland.

== History ==
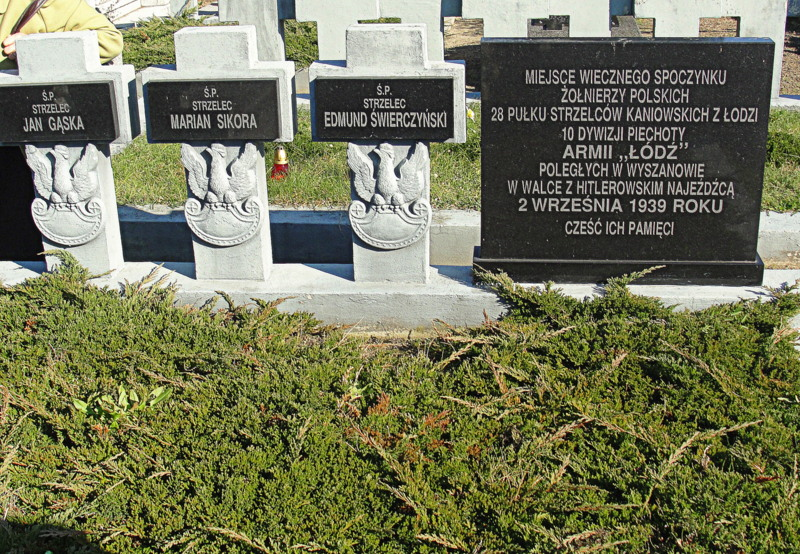
Graves of the fallen Polish defenders of the village from September 1939

Wyszanów was a royal village of the Polish Crown, administratively located in the Ostrzeszów County in the Sieradz Voivodeship in the Greater Poland Province.

During the German invasion of Poland, which started World War II, in September 1939, the Germans deliberately threw a grenade into a basement where women and children were hiding, thus killing 16 people, including 11 children (the Wyszanów massacre, see also Nazi crimes against the Polish nation).
