= Rzepisko, West Pomeranian Voivodeship =

Hamlet in West Pomeranian Voivodeship, Poland

Rzepisko
- hamlet (colony)
- Location within Poland
- Coordinates: 53°12′29″N 15°46′44″E
- Country: Poland
- Voivodeship: West Pomeranian
- County: Choszczno
- Municipality: Drawno
- Time zone: UTC+1 (CET)
  - Summer (DST): UTC+2 (CEST)
- Postal code: 73-220
- Area code: +48 95
- Car plates: ZCH

Rzepisko (Polish: [ʐɛˈpis.kɔ]) is a hamlet (colony) in West Pomeranian Voivodeship, Poland, located within the municipality of Drawno in Choszczno County.
