= Gmina Łubnice, Łódź Voivodeship =

Gmina Łubnice Łubnice Commune
- Gmina
- Flag Coat of arms
- Interactive map of Gmina Łubnice
- Coordinates (Łubnice): 51°9′45″N 18°17′24″E
- Country: Poland
- Voivodeship: Łódź
- County: Wieruszów
- Seat: Łubnice

Area
  - Total: 60.9 km^{2} (23.5 sq mi)

Population (2006)
  - Total: 4,194
  - Density: 68.9/km^{2} (178/sq mi)
- Website: http://www.uglubnice.com.pl

Gmina Łubnice is a rural gmina (administrative district) in Wieruszów County, Łódź Voivodeship, in central Poland. Its seat is the village of Łubnice, which lies approximately 19 kilometres (12 mi) south-east of Wieruszów and 107 km (66 mi) south-west of the regional capital Łódź.

The gmina covers an area of 60.9 square kilometres (23.5 sq mi), and as of 2006 its total population is 4,194.

== Villages ==
Gmina Łubnice contains the villages and settlements of Andrzejów, Dzietrzkowice, Kolonia Dzietrzkowice, Łubnice, Ludwinów and Wójcin.

== Neighbouring gminas ==
Gmina Łubnice is bordered by the gminas of Biała, Bolesławiec, Byczyna, Czastary, Gorzów Śląski and Skomlin.
