= Torzeniec =

- Village
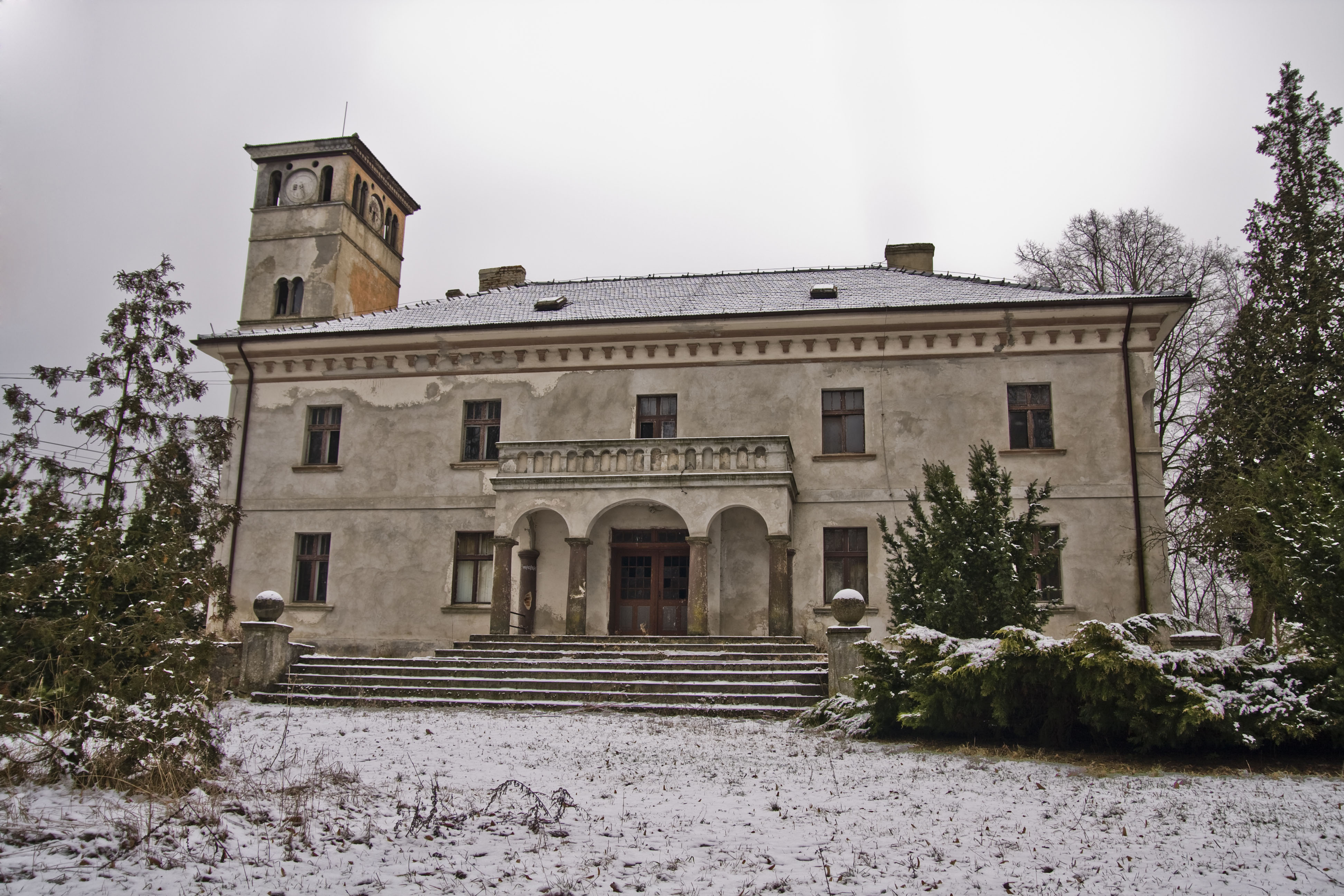
- Torzeniec Palace

- Location within Poland
- Coordinates: 51°24′N 18°8′E
- Country: Poland
- Voivodeship: Greater Poland
- County: Ostrzeszów
- Gmina: Doruchów
- Time zone: UTC+1 (CET)
  - Summer (DST): UTC+2 (CEST)
- Vehicle registration: POT

Torzeniec [tɔˈʐɛɲɛt͡s] is a village in the administrative district of Gmina Doruchów, within Ostrzeszów County, Greater Poland Voivodeship, in south-central Poland.

== History ==
According to the 1921 census, the village had a population of 629, entirely Polish by nationality, 98.7% Roman Catholic and 1.3% Lutheran by confession.

During the German invasion of Poland at the start of World War II in September 1939, while fighting at night, German troops mistakenly fired on each other and then blamed the local Polish inhabitants. In "retaliation," German soldiers set fire to the village, shot at fleeing residents, and then organized a nighttime manhunt. Additionally, they executed 18 captured Polish men the next morning (the Torzeniec massacre, see also Nazi crimes against the Polish nation).
