= Wieruszów =

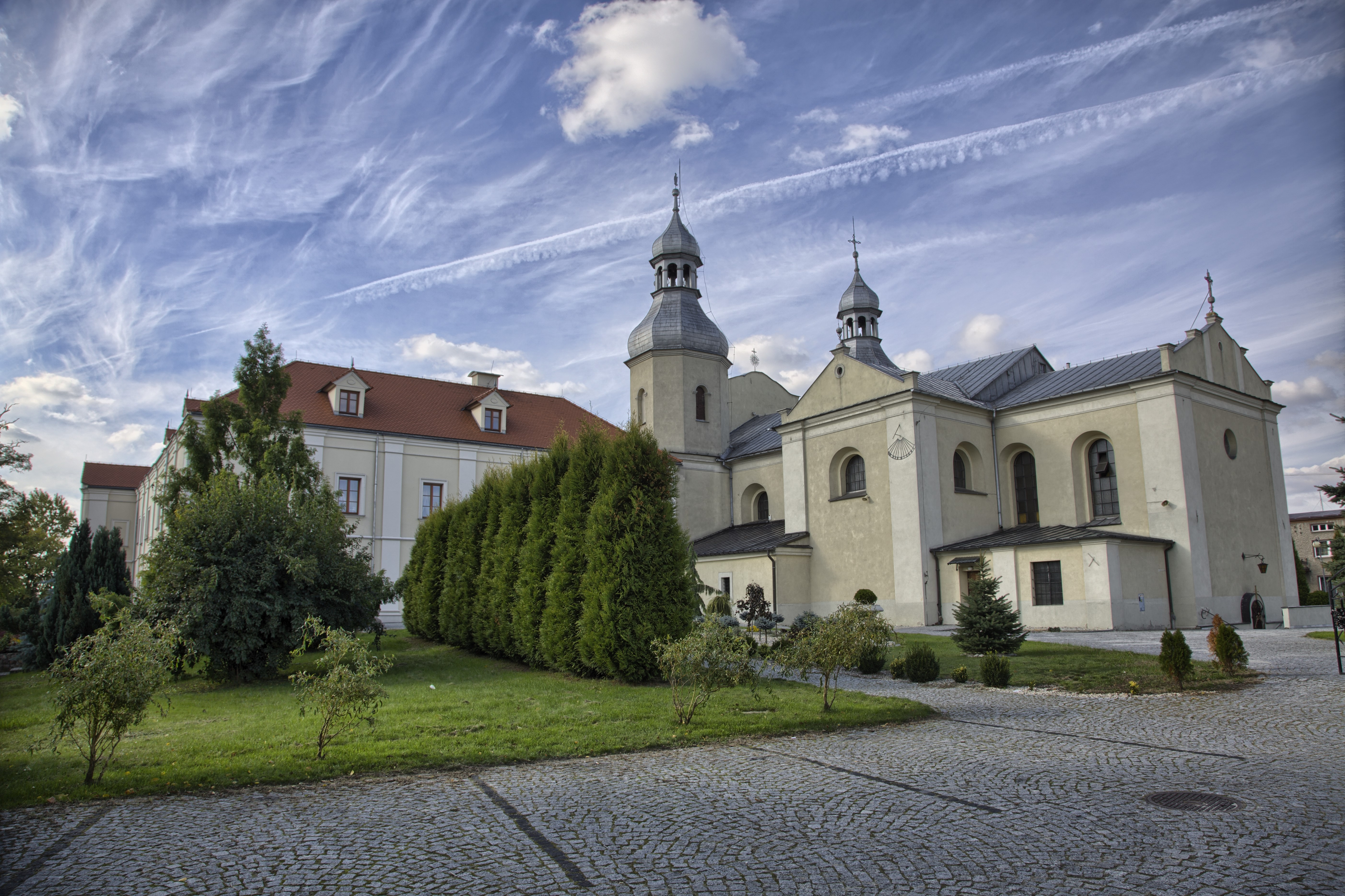
- Pauline Monastery and Church of the Holy Spirit

- Flag Coat of arms

- Location within Poland
- Coordinates: 51°18′N 18°9′E
- Country: Poland
- Voivodeship: Łódź
- County: Wieruszów
- Gmina: Wieruszów
- Established: before 13th century
- Town rights: 1297-1870, 1919

Government
  - Mayor: Rafał Przybył

Area
  - Total: 5.98 km^{2} (2.31 sq mi)

Population (31 December 2020)
  - Total: 8,446 ▼
  - Density: 1,410/km^{2} (3,660/sq mi)
- Time zone: UTC+1 (CET)
  - Summer (DST): UTC+2 (CEST)
- Postal code: 98-400
- Area code: +48 62
- Vehicle registration: EWE
- Climate: Cfb
- Website: http://www.wieruszow.pl

Wieruszów ([vjɛˈruʂuf]; German: Weruschau) is a town in south-central Poland with 8,446 inhabitants (2020). Situated in the southwestern part of Łódź Voivodeship, it is the seat of the Gmina Wieruszów and Wieruszów County. Wieruszów is located in the historical Wieluń Land. The town is situated along the Prosna river.

== History ==
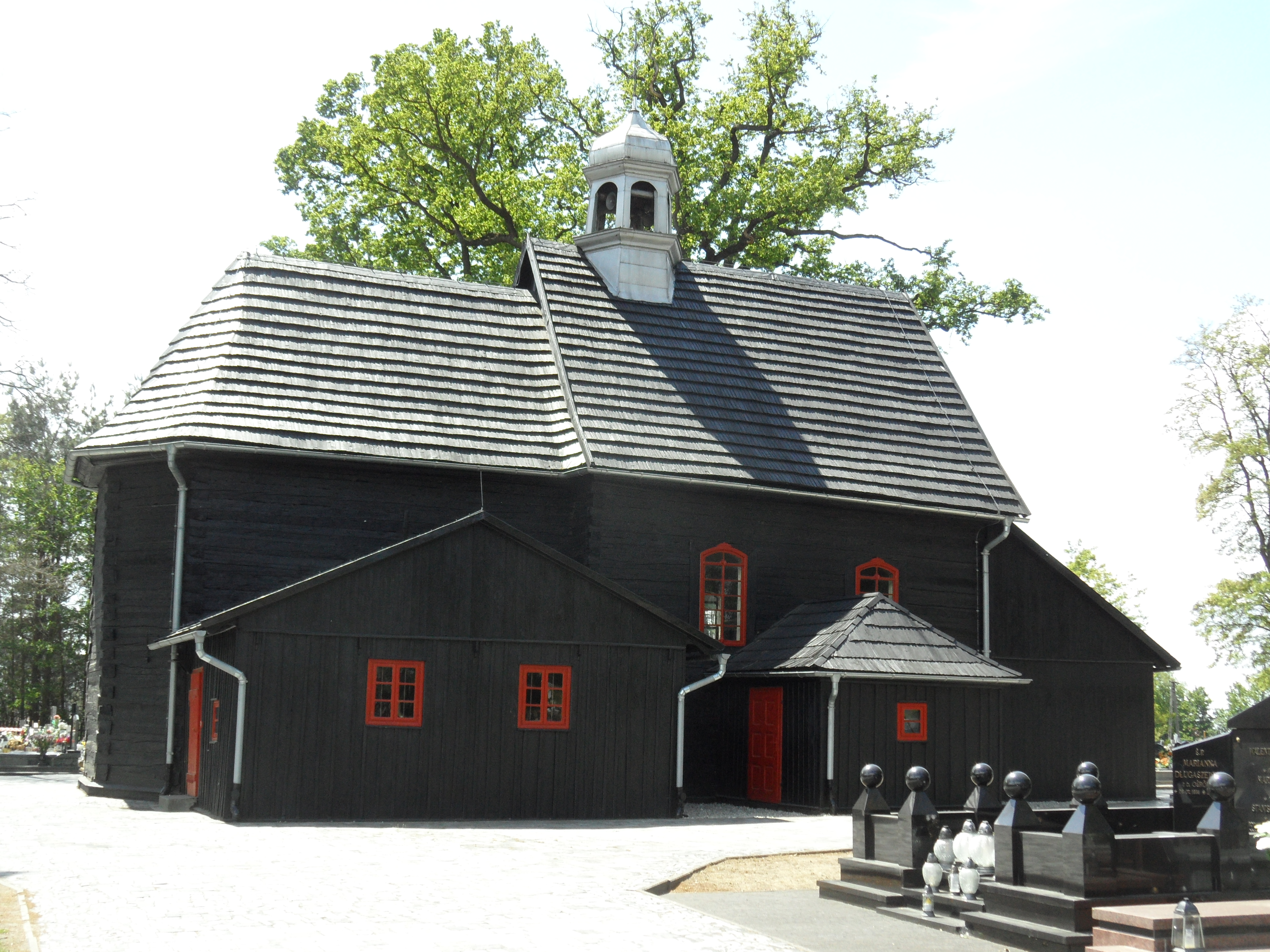
Preserved old wooden St. Roch church in the Podzamcze district

Wieruszów was granted town rights, when it was part of Piast-ruled Poland. The town developed in the Late Middle Ages under the patronage of the Polish noble Wierusz family. It was a private town, administratively located in the Wieluń County in the Sieradz Voivodeship in the Greater Poland Province of the Kingdom of Poland. The local Catholic parish was erected in 1386 by Przecław of Pogorzela, Bishop of Wrocław. In 1401, Bernard Wierusz founded the Pauline monastery. Augustyn Kordecki, prior of the Jasna Góra Monastery in Częstochowa, commander of the heroic and successful Polish defense of Jasna Góra during the Swedish invasion in 1655, died in the monastery in Wieruszów in 1673. The monastery was rebuilt in its present form in 1676 in Baroque style. The church interior contains nine Baroque altars and choir stalls from 1682. There is a portrait of Bernard Wierusz, the first owner and founder of the church at the choir.

The town was annexed by Prussia in the Second Partition of Poland in 1793, then regained by Poles and included within the newly established, but short-lived, Duchy of Warsaw in 1807, and in 1815 it passed to the Russian Partition of Poland, while its Podzamcze suburb fell again to Prussia, and from 1871 formed part of Germany. As punishment for the unsuccessful Polish January Uprising, Wieruszów was among over 300 towns stripped of their town rights by the Tsarist administration in 1869–1870, and the Pauline monastery was closed down. After World War I, in 1918, Poland regained independence, and Wieruszów was reintegrated with Poland, while Podzamcze was still held by Germany. Town rights were restored. In April 1919, the German artillery fired 18 shells from Podzamcze at a crowd at the town's weekly market, killing seven people, including a 9-year-old boy. From June to August 1919, the Germans repeatedly shelled the town and attempted an invasion, but were repelled by the Poles. Dozens of houses were destroyed. Soon after, as a result of the successful Greater Poland Uprising against Germany, Podzamcze was restored to Poland. A monument to the insurgents was erected in Podzamcze in 1925. Until World War II, the town had a significant Jewish population of more than 2,000.

=== World War II ===
As a result of the German-Soviet invasion of Poland, which started World War II in September 1939, the town was occupied by Germany. The Germans immediately murdered several Poles and Jews and kidnapped others. Later on, Wieruszów was annexed directly to Nazi Germany. The Germans destroyed the monument of the heroes of the Greater Poland Uprising. Over the next two years, the Germans kidnapped Jews for forced labour, required them to live in a ghetto in the poorest part of town, turning over their former residences to Poles, and sent both men and women to work camps near Poznań. In August 1942, the remaining Jews were rounded up and held in a local monastery for several days. Several Jews were murdered there. Others were sent to the Łódź Ghetto, and the remainder, perhaps 800–900, were taken by train to the Chełmno extermination camp where they were immediately gassed. After that, local Poles were forced to move into the houses vacated by Jewish townspeople. After the war, a few Jewish survivors returned to Wieruszów but left after several Jews were murdered. The number of survivors is unknown.

The local police chief and another Polish policemen were murdered by the Russians in the Katyn massacre in 1940.

=== Post-war history ===
The Greater Poland Uprising monument was rebuilt after the war, and it now also commemorates the victims of both world wars. Podzamcze was included with the town limits in 1973. In 1973, during the celebration of the 300th anniversary of the death of Augustyn Kordecki, the former Pauline church was graced by the presence of Cardinal Karol Wojtyła - the future Pope John Paul II and Cardinal Stefan Wyszyński. From 1975 to 1998, it was part of the Kalisz Voivodeship, and since 1999 it is part of the Łódź Voivodeship.

== Transport ==
The Polish Expressway S8 (highway) runs just outside of the town limits, and the Voivodeship roads 450 and 482 pass through the town. There is also a train station.

== Sports ==
Local sports clubs include football team Prosna Wieruszów, youth athletics club Start Wieruszów, and martial arts club Husaria Wieruszów.

== Notable residents ==
- Abbot Augustyn Kordecki, died here.
- Piotr Paweł Morta, a Polish political activist, dissident, economist, co-inventor, activist in underground "Solidarity".
- Rafał Kurzawa, Polish professional football player.
