= Wieruszów County =

Wieruszów County Powiat wieruszowski
- County
- Flag Coat of arms

- Location within the voivodeship
- Coordinates (Wieruszów): 51°18′N 18°9′E
- Country: Poland
- Voivodeship: Łódź
- Seat: Wieruszów
- Gminas: Total 7: Gmina Bolesławiec; Gmina Czastary; Gmina Galewice; Gmina Łubnice; Gmina Lututów; Gmina Sokolniki; Gmina Wieruszów

Area
  - Total: 576.22 km^{2} (222.48 sq mi)

Population (2006)
  - Total: 42,336
  - Density: 73.472/km^{2} (190.29/sq mi)
  - Urban: 8,759
  - Rural: 33,577
- Car plates: EWE
- Website: www.powiat-wieruszowski.pl/index.htm

Wieruszów County (Polish: powiat wieruszowski) is a unit of territorial administration and local government (powiat) in Łódź Voivodeship, central Poland. It came into being on January 1, 1999, as a result of the Polish local government reforms passed in 1998. Its administrative seat and only town is Wieruszów, which lies 106 kilometres (66 mi) south-west of the regional capital Łódź.

The county covers an area of 576.22 square kilometres (222.5 sq mi). As of 2006 its total population is 42,336, out of which the population of Wieruszów is 8,759 and the rural population is 33,577.

== Massacres during Second World War ==
=== Wieszanów Massacre ===
During the German Invasion of Poland in 1939, German soldiers conducted a number of massacres in the area. In the village of Wieszanów on 1 September 1939, 17 women and children (as young as 2 years old) were murdered en masse after two men were murdered by German soldiers. Women and children tried to hide themselves in cellars but were discovered by soldiers. Despite pleading to be allowed to get out, they were forced to stay as Germans threw down several grenades, murdering 14 women and children on the spot and wounding 3 of them. Several local men were later kidnapped and sent to German concentration camps. At least two were executed already on their way to the camps. A day later the same Germans who committed the murder came back and burned down 20 homes along with the livestock.

=== Torzeniec Massacre ===
Several massacres were made by Germans in the village of Torzeniec. On 1 September 1939 Germans arrived during the night to the town, and started to set fire to barns and houses using bottles with gasoline and gun fire with incendiary bullets. Villagers who tried to escape their burning homes were gunned down by the Germans who behaved as they were making a hunt for animals. Eight people were murdered in this way alongside Barbara Pietrzak who tried to save her 2-year-old child. Another eight were burned alive in the cellar as their only escape route was blocked by a burning barn. The only member of the family left outside, 70-year-old Antoni Kubera was shot dead on his backyard by the Germans just as his family was burning alive in the cellar. On the same night all men from the village were gathered by the Germans, and every second one was led to a group that was executed in front of all the villagers. 18 men were murdered this way. A Polish woman(Maria Stambuła) who according to Germans refused to watch the murder was shot severely by the Germans as well. During the massacre a 40-year-old Józef Sadowski and a husband and father of several children pleaded to be exchanged for his 70-year-old father Stanisław Sadowski who was chosen by the Germans to be murdered. The Germans agreed and the son saved his father's life by sacrificing himself. Later during the night another massacre was made by the German soldiers. Four unidentified Polish PoWs were taken to the village and murdered. All together the cemetery in Wyszanów is the place of burial of 57 victims of German massacres.

== Neighbouring counties ==
Wieruszów County is bordered by Sieradz County to the north-east, Wieluń County to the east, Olesno County and Kluczbork County to the south, Kępno County to the west, and Ostrzeszów County to the north-west.

== Administrative divisions ==
The county is subdivided into seven gminas (two urban-rural and five rural). These are listed in the following table, in descending order of population.

Gmina	Type	Area (km^{2})	Population (2006)	Seat
Gmina Wieruszów	urban-rural	97.1	14,176	Wieruszów
Gmina Galewice	rural	135.8	6,183	Galewice
Gmina Sokolniki	rural	80.0	4,875	Sokolniki
Gmina Lututów	urban-rural	75.1	4,751	Lututów
Gmina Łubnice	rural	60.9	4,194	Łubnice
Gmina Bolesławiec	rural	64.6	4,116	Bolesławiec
Gmina Czastary	rural	62.7	4,041	Czastary
