= Skora =

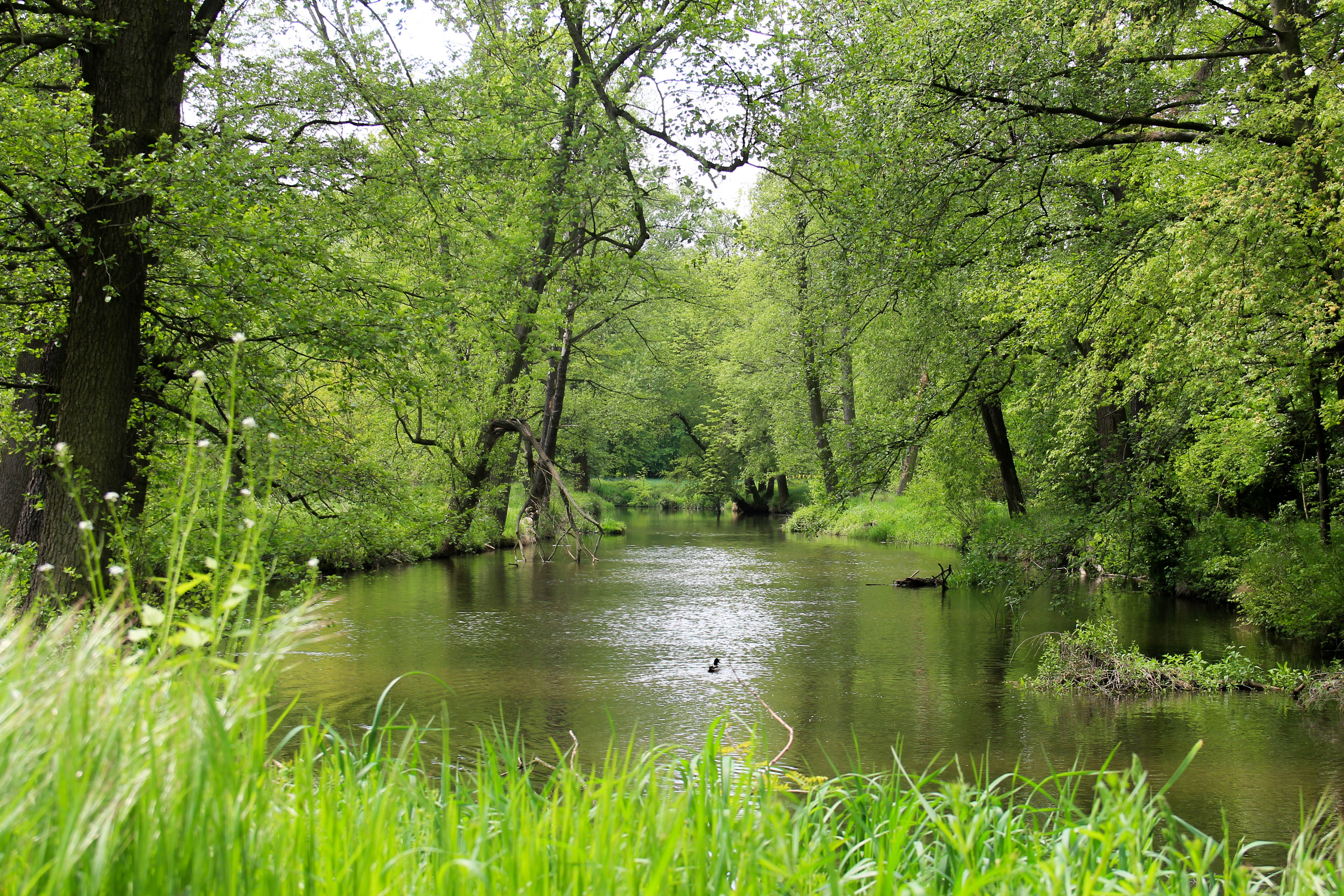
- Skora in Konradówka

Location
- Country: Poland

Physical characteristics
- Mouth
  - location: Czarna Woda
  - coordinates: 51°16′41″N 16°04′51″E

Basin features
- Progression: Czarna Woda→ Kaczawa→ Oder→ Baltic Sea

The Skora is a river of Poland, a tributary of the Czarna Woda. Known in German as the Schnelle Deichsa, it flows through the Legnica and Złotoryja districts, with its source in the Pogórze Kaczawskie (foothills). Towns along the river include Pielgrzymka, Wojcieszyn, Uniejowice, Zagrodno, Modlikowice, Jadwisin, Osetnica, Konradówka, Chojnów, Goliszów, Niedźwiedzice and Grzymalin. It then enters the Czarna Woda. On its journey, it flows through the Sądreckie Wzgórza (hills), where it merges with the Czermnica river.

== Fauna ==
The upper Skora abounds in trout, graylings, and minnow. Further downstream, chub, perch and barbels are found.

== Gallery ==
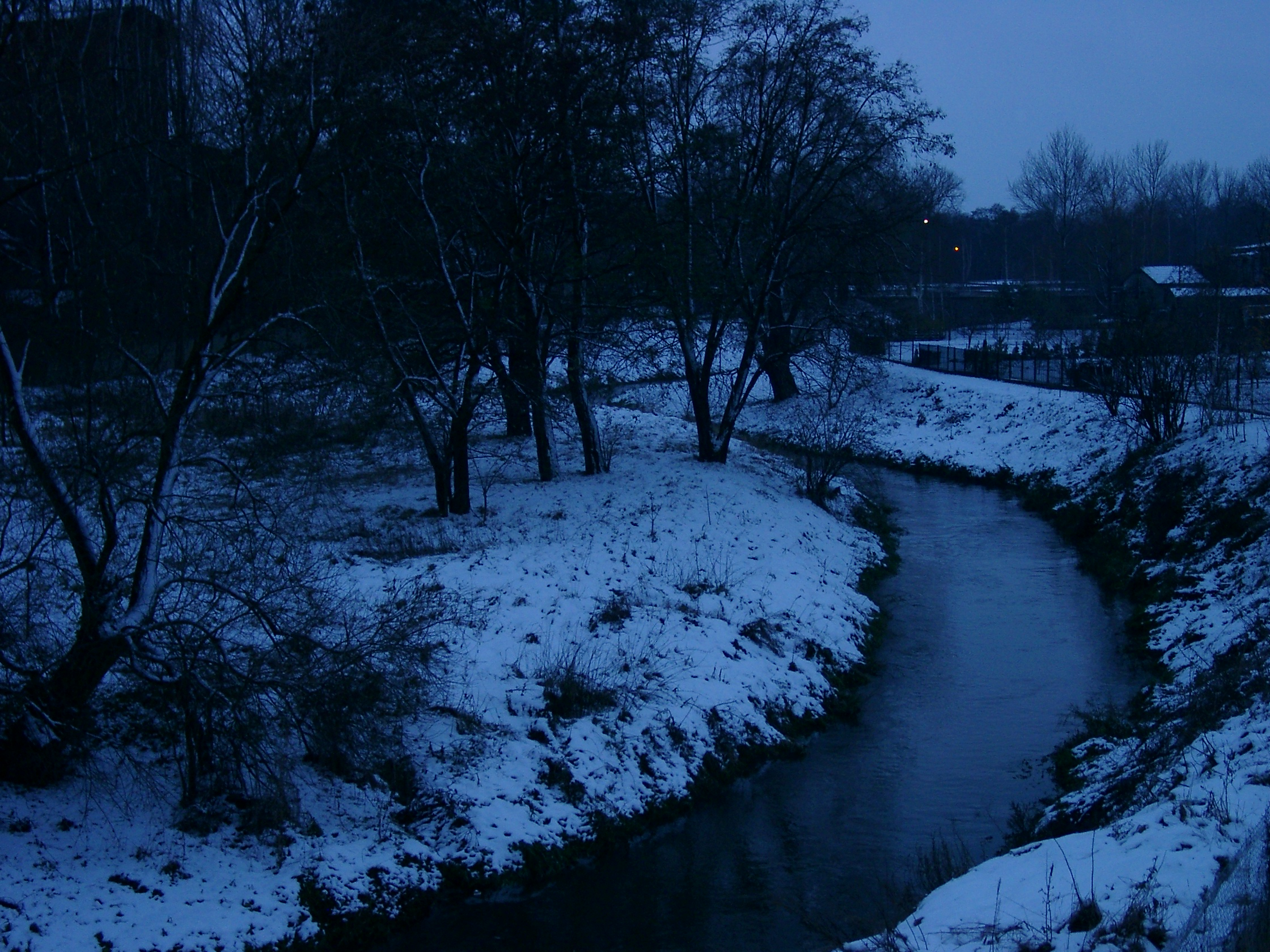
The Skora River in Chojnów in winter

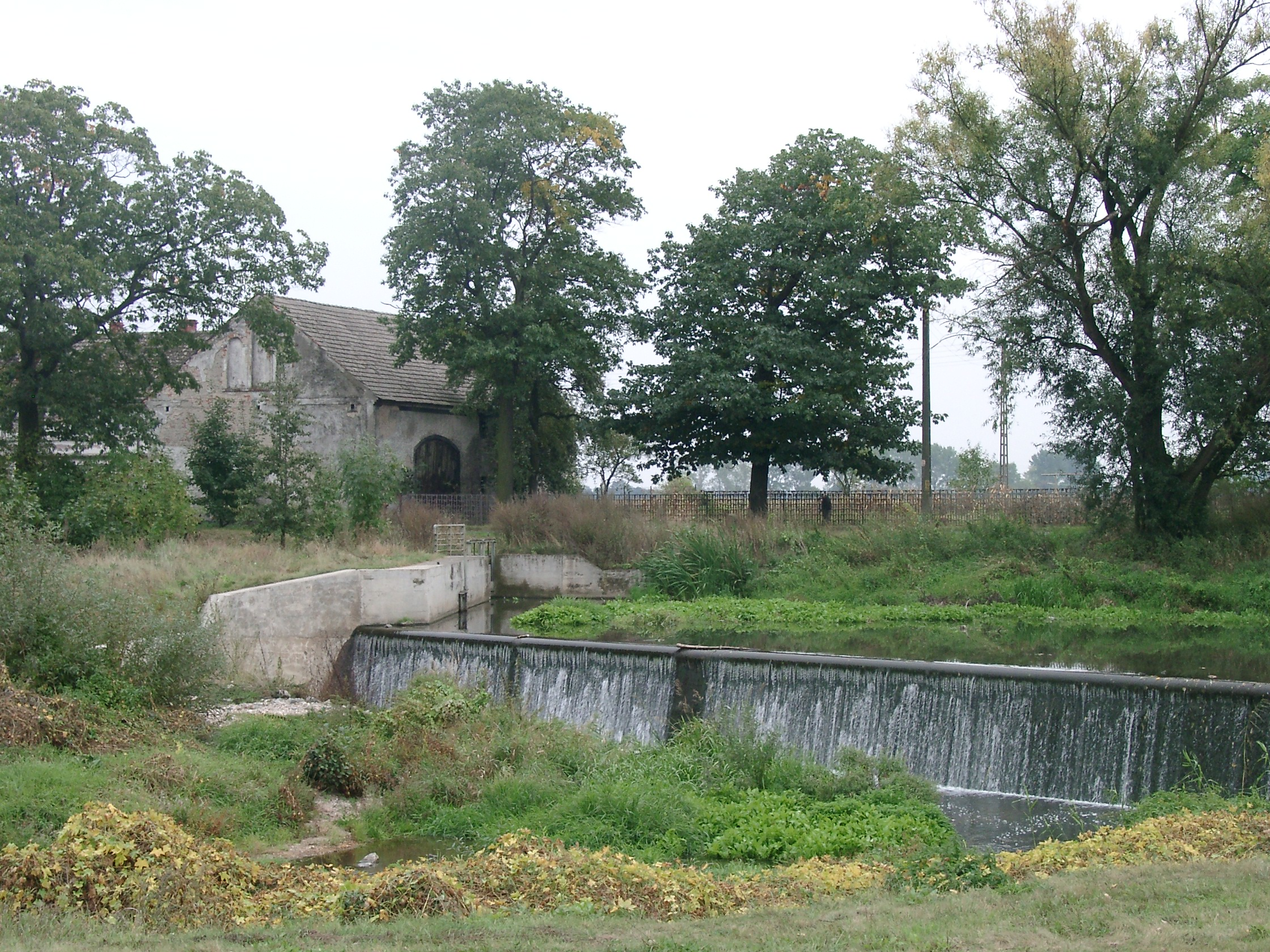
Goliszow Skora River near Chojnow

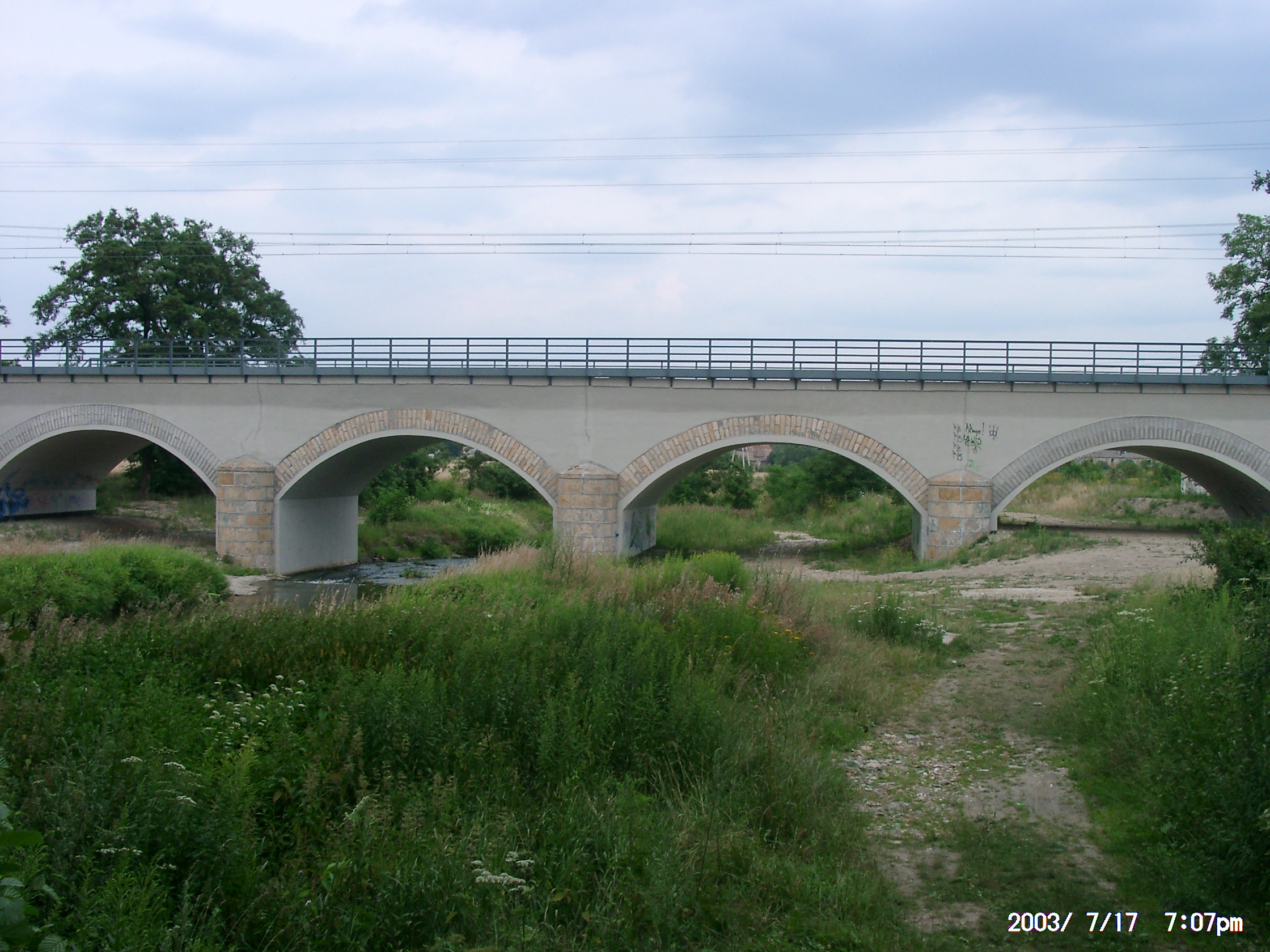
Skora River bridge near Chojnow
