= Skora (disambiguation) =

Skora is a river of Poland.

Skora may also refer to:

== People ==
- Ben Skora (1937–2018), American inventor
- Éric Skora (born 1981), French footballer

== Other uses ==
- Skora Building, a building in Indiana

== See also ==
- Anna Ekielska-Skóra (born 1976), Polish flautist and social activist
- Michał Skóraś (born 2000), Polish footballer
