= Dębrzyna, Lower Silesian Voivodeship =

Dębrzyna
- Colony
- Location within Poland
- Coordinates: 51°20′00″N 15°55′08″E
- Country: Poland
- Voivodeship: Lower Silesian
- County: Legnica
- Gmina: Chojnów
- Time zone: UTC+1 (CET)
  - Summer (DST): UTC+2 (CEST)
- Vehicle registration: DLE
- Website: https://web.archive.org/web/20060206163523/http://gmina.chojnow.pl/

Dębrzyna [dɛmˈbʐɨna] is a settlement in the village of Zamienice in the administrative district of Gmina Chojnów, within Legnica County, Lower Silesian Voivodeship, in south-western Poland.
