= Pątnów =

Pątnów may refer to the following places in Poland:

- Pątnów, Lower Silesian Voivodeship (south-west Poland)
- Pątnów, Łódź Voivodeship (central Poland)
- Pątnów, Konin a district of Konin (central Poland)
  - Pątnów Power Station
