= Kolonia Kołłątaja =

- Village
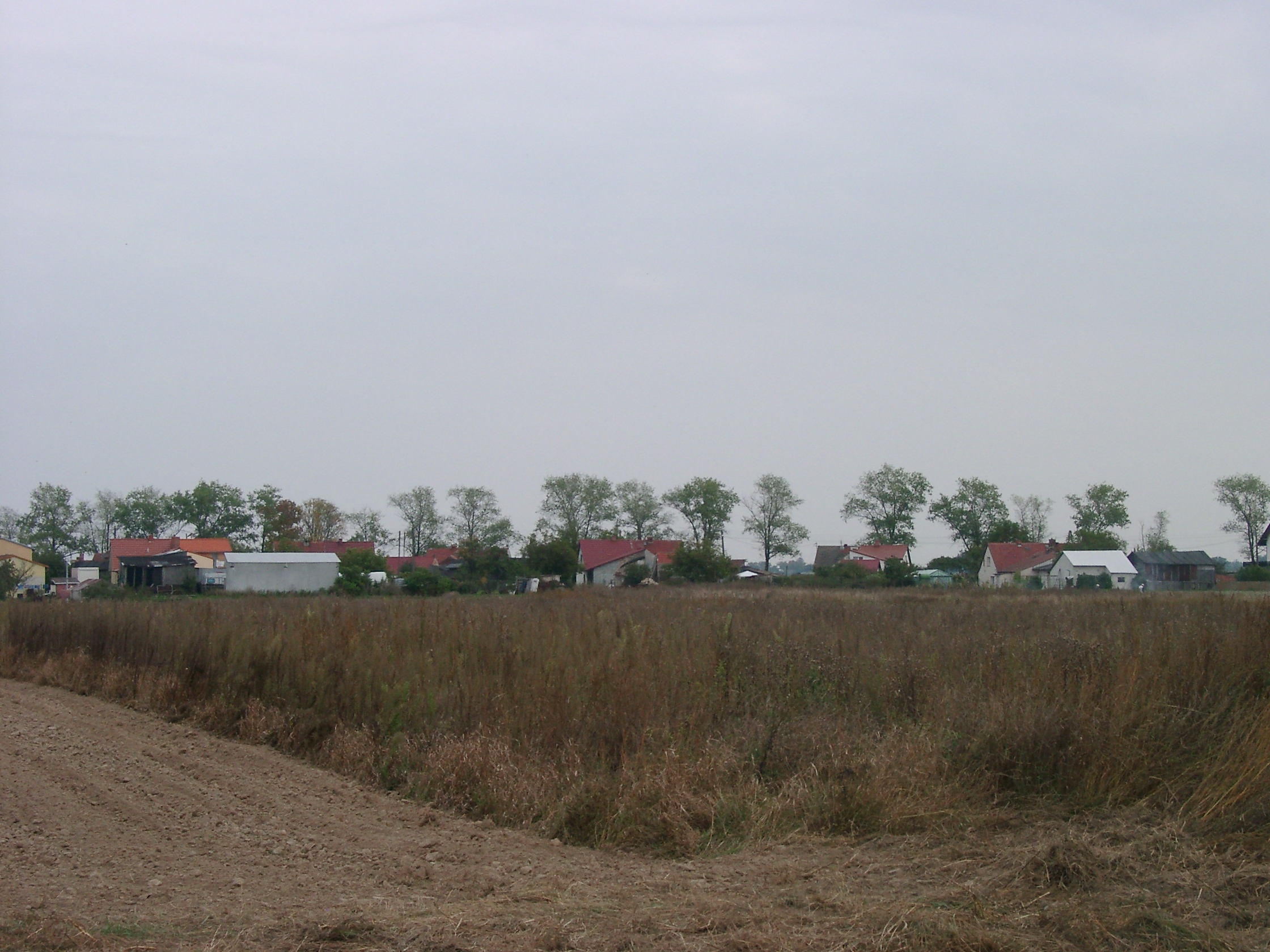

- Location within Poland
- Coordinates: 51°17′23″N 15°56′51″E
- Country: Poland
- Voivodeship: Lower Silesian
- County: Legnica
- Gmina: Chojnów
- Population (approx.): 150
- Time zone: UTC+1 (CET)
  - Summer (DST): UTC+2 (CEST)
- Vehicle registration: DLE

Kolonia Kołłątaja (Polish pronunciation: [kɔˈlɔɲa kɔu̯wɔnˈtaja]) is a village in the administrative district of Gmina Chojnów, within Legnica County, Lower Silesian Voivodeship, in south-western Poland.

The village has an approximate population of 150.
