= Pawlikowice, Lower Silesian Voivodeship =

Pawlikowice
- Village
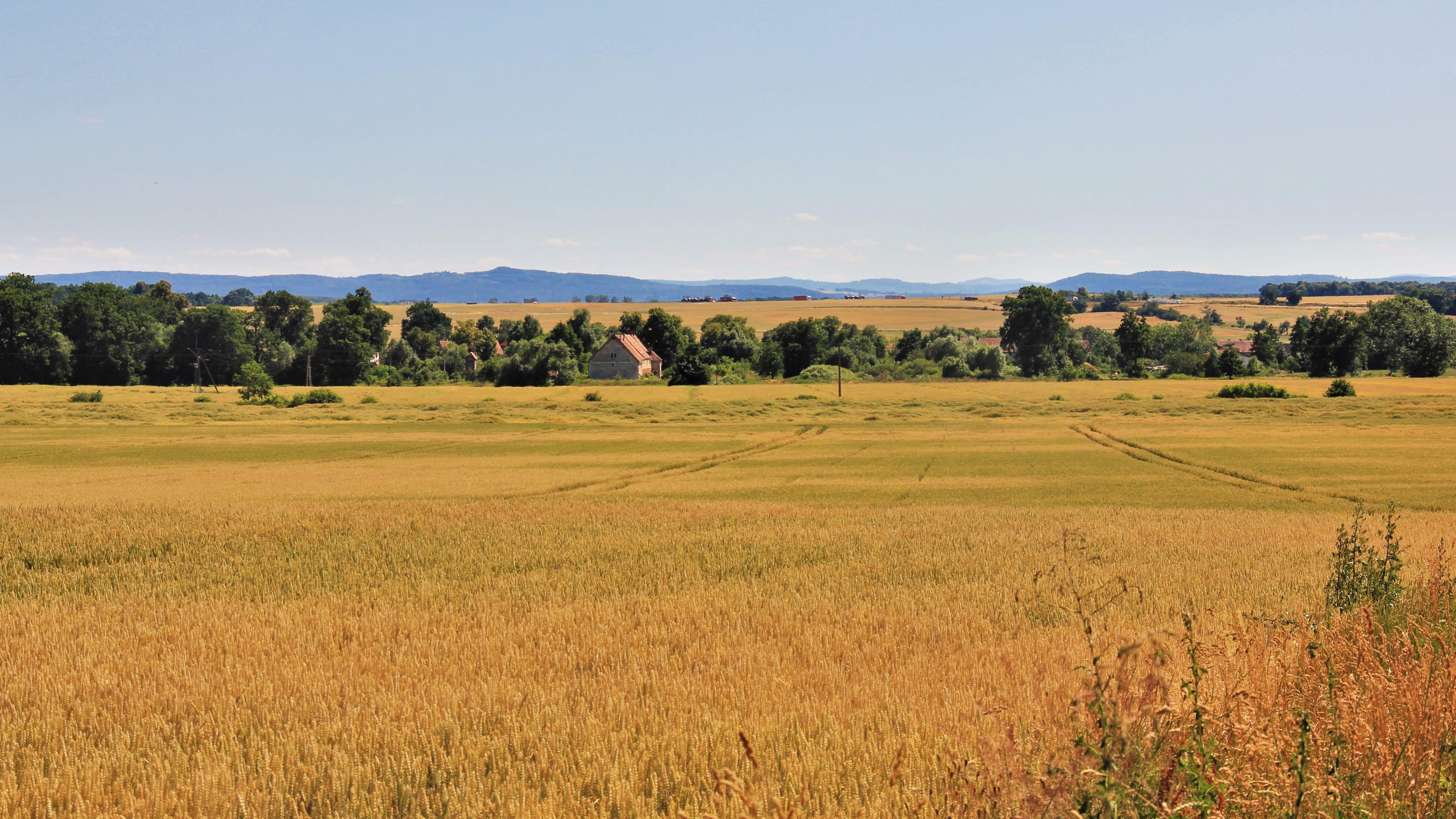

- Location within Poland
- Coordinates: 51°13′48″N 15°59′12″E
- Country: Poland
- Voivodeship: Lower Silesian
- County: Legnica
- Gmina: Chojnów
- Time zone: UTC+1 (CET)
  - Summer (DST): UTC+2 (CEST)
- Vehicle registration: DLE

Pawlikowice [pavlikɔˈvit͡sɛ] is a village in the administrative district of Gmina Chojnów, within Legnica County, Lower Silesian Voivodeship, in south-western Poland.
