= Budziwojów =

- Village
- Location within Poland
- Coordinates: 51°13′59″N 15°56′29″E
- Country: Poland
- Voivodeship: Lower Silesian
- County: Legnica
- Gmina: Chojnów
- Time zone: UTC+1 (CET)
  - Summer (DST): UTC+2 (CEST)
- Vehicle registration: DLE

Budziwojów [bud͡ʑiˈvɔjuf] is a village in the administrative district of Gmina Chojnów, within Legnica County, Lower Silesian Voivodeship, in south-western Poland.
