= Brzozy =

- Village
- Location within Poland
- Coordinates: 51°21′N 15°53′E
- Country: Poland
- Voivodeship: Lower Silesian
- County: Legnica
- Gmina: Chojnów
- Website: https://web.archive.org/web/20060206163523/http://gmina.chojnow.pl/

Brzozy [ˈbʐɔzɨ] is a village in the administrative district of Gmina Chojnów, within Legnica County, Lower Silesian Voivodeship, in south-western Poland.
