= Gołocin =

Gołocin may refer to the following places in Poland:

- Gołocin, Lower Silesian Voivodeship (south-west Poland)
- Gołocin, Masovian Voivodeship (east-central Poland)
