= Architecture of Legnica =

Architecture of Poland includes modern and historical monuments of architectural and historical importance. Legnica is a city in southwestern Poland, in the central part of Lower Silesia, on the Kaczawa River (left tributary of the Oder) and the Czarna Woda. The city is renowned for its varied architecture, spanning from early medieval to modern period.

== Architecture of individual districts ==
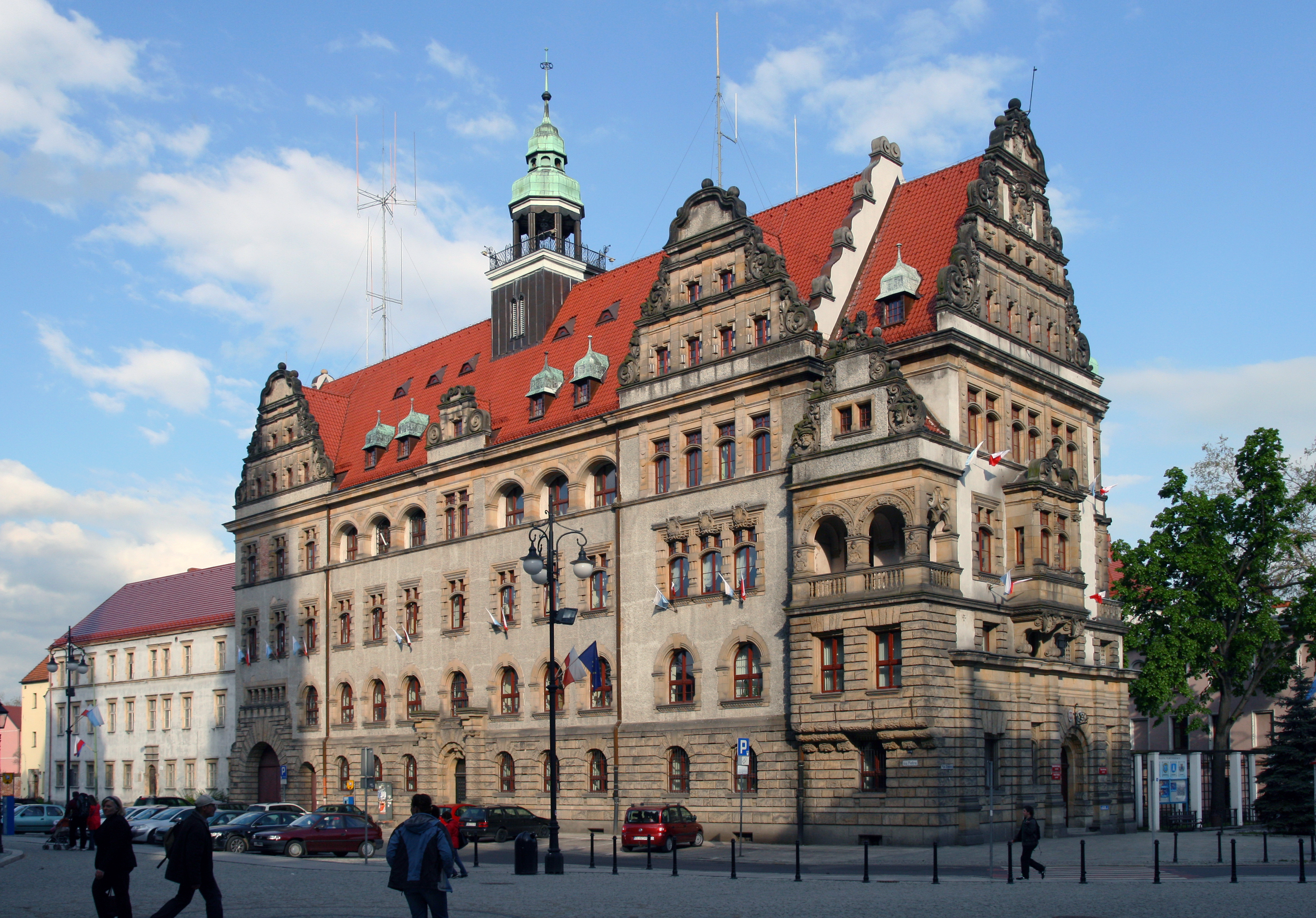
New City Hall

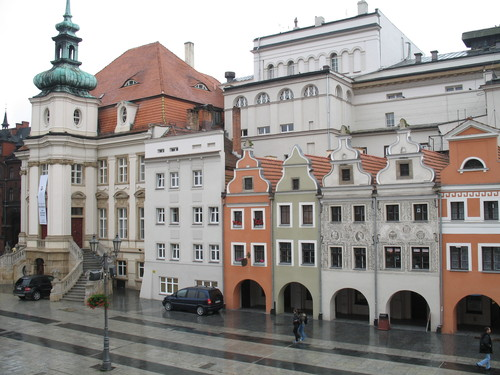
"Śledziówki" ("Herrings" tenement hpuses) in the market square

The area of the very center of the city, consumed over the centuries by numerous fires, was partially covered by plattenbau buildings in the 60s and 70s and is currently not architecturally consistent. The downtown includes buildings from the medieval times (Piast Castle, Cathedral, St. Mary's Church, towers from parts of the fortification walls), the Renaissance (fragments of the Castle, "Śledziówki" (Herrings) tenement houses, Dom Pod Przepiórczym Koszem, Scultetus House), the Baroque (Knights' Academy, Church of St. John the Baptist, the former Church of Maurice, the Curia of the Abbots of Lubiąż, the Old City Hall), as well as examples of neoclassical architecture (the building of the former "Empik" in the Market Square), neo-Baroque architecture (the buildings of the 1st High School and the bank seat in the Monastery Square), and modern buildings - tenement houses built until the early 20th century.

The districts adjacent to the medieval center are more homogeneous - the southern district of Tarninów is dominated by eclectic buildings with elements of modernism and Art Nouveau. The southern part of the district is dominated by tenement houses.

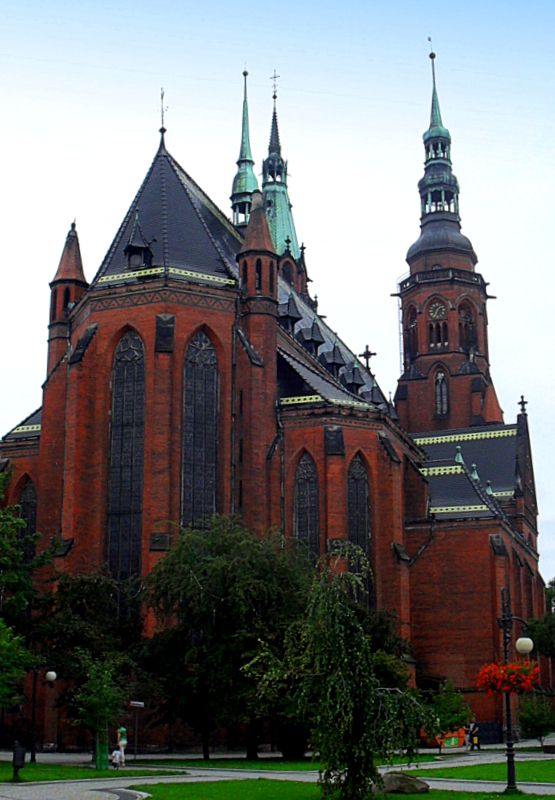
Cathedral of St. Apostles Peter and Paul

The western Fabryczna district consists of nineteenth-century factories and worker's houses, as well as the Kartuzy district located in the eastern part, the tenement houses are also partly located in the north and southeast. The Ochota district (to the southeast; from the City Park to Tarninów district) is also built up with tenement houses from the early twentieth century. Single-family residential complexes - Piekary Wielkie district with terraced houses: Stare Piekary (northeast), the area of the Głogów Suburb (north) and part of the Sienkiewicza residential area (south), Przybków (south), the Nowe residential area (south), and part of the Białe Sady (southeast) district from the 1920s are a representative development of the city-garden concept. Single-family houses built in the nineteenth century are represented by the following residential areas: the American (west), the Sienkiewicz's (south), Aleje (southeast) and Białe Sady (southwest). The northern part of the Bielany district and the northern part of the Sienkiewicz residential area are the remnants of the idea of building low-cost housing estates.

The blocks of flats in the area of Działkowa, Chojnowska and Marynarska streets, Asnyka and Złotoryska (Asnyka neighbourhood), Gliwicka (Czarny Dwór) and Rzeczypospolitej Avenue (Bielany) are an example of modernist architecture. The Fadom technology plattenbau architecture is represented by the eastern neighborhoods of the late 1970s and early 1980s - the Copernican neighborhood of the late 1980s and early 1990s - The Piekary neighborhood and in the west part of the Asnyka neighborhood, as well as Zosinek and the vicinity of Drzymała and Piątnicka streets. The buildings near Myrka, Mysliwiecka, Slubicka, Poznanska, Chocianowska and Złotoryjska Streets are all former barrack complexes of the Wehrmacht and later of the Northern Group of the Soviet Army, now adapted for modern apartments. Among these are also individual plattenbau buildings built by Polish companies in exchange for the plots in the downtown area of the city (the western part of the Zosinek neighborhood built in the "Wrocław Plattenbau" technology, buildings on Bydgoska, Chojnowska and Marcinkowskiego or Wybickiego and Kościuszki streets in Tarninów), as well as assembled from elements brought from the USSR ("Leningrad" type buildings).
