= Groble =

Groble may refer to the following places in Poland:

- Groble, Lower Silesian Voivodeship (south-west Poland)
- Groble, Subcarpathian Voivodeship (south-east Poland)
