= Dobroszów =

Dobroszów may refer to the following places in Poland:

- Dobroszów, Legnica County in Lower Silesian Voivodeship (SW Poland)
- Dobroszów, Strzelin County in Lower Silesian Voivodeship (SW Poland)
