= Dębrzyna =

Dębrzyna may refer to:

- Dębrzyna, West Pomeranian Voivodeship, in Gmina Szczecinek, Szczecinek County, West Pomeranian Voivodeship, Poland
- Dębrzyna, Lower Silesian Voivodeship, in Gmina Chojnów, within Legnica County, Lower Silesian Voivodeship, Poland

== See also ==
- Dębrzyno, in Kościerzyna County, Pomeranian Voivodeship, Poland
