= Michów =

Michów may refer to the following places in Poland:

- Michów, Lower Silesian Voivodeship (south-west Poland)
- Michów, Lublin Voivodeship (east Poland)
