= Jerzmanowice =

Jerzmanowice may refer to the following places in Poland:

- Jerzmanowice, Lower Silesian Voivodeship (south-west Poland)
- Jerzmanowice, Lesser Poland Voivodeship (south Poland)
