= Niedźwiedzice =

Niedźwiedzice may refer to the following places in Poland:

- Niedźwiedzice, Legnica County in Gmina Chojnów, Legnica County in Lower Silesian Voivodeship (SW Poland)
- Niedźwiedzice, Wałbrzych County in Gmina Walim, Wałbrzych County in Lower Silesian Voivodeship (SW Poland)
