= Piotrowice, Legnica County =

Piotrowice
- Village
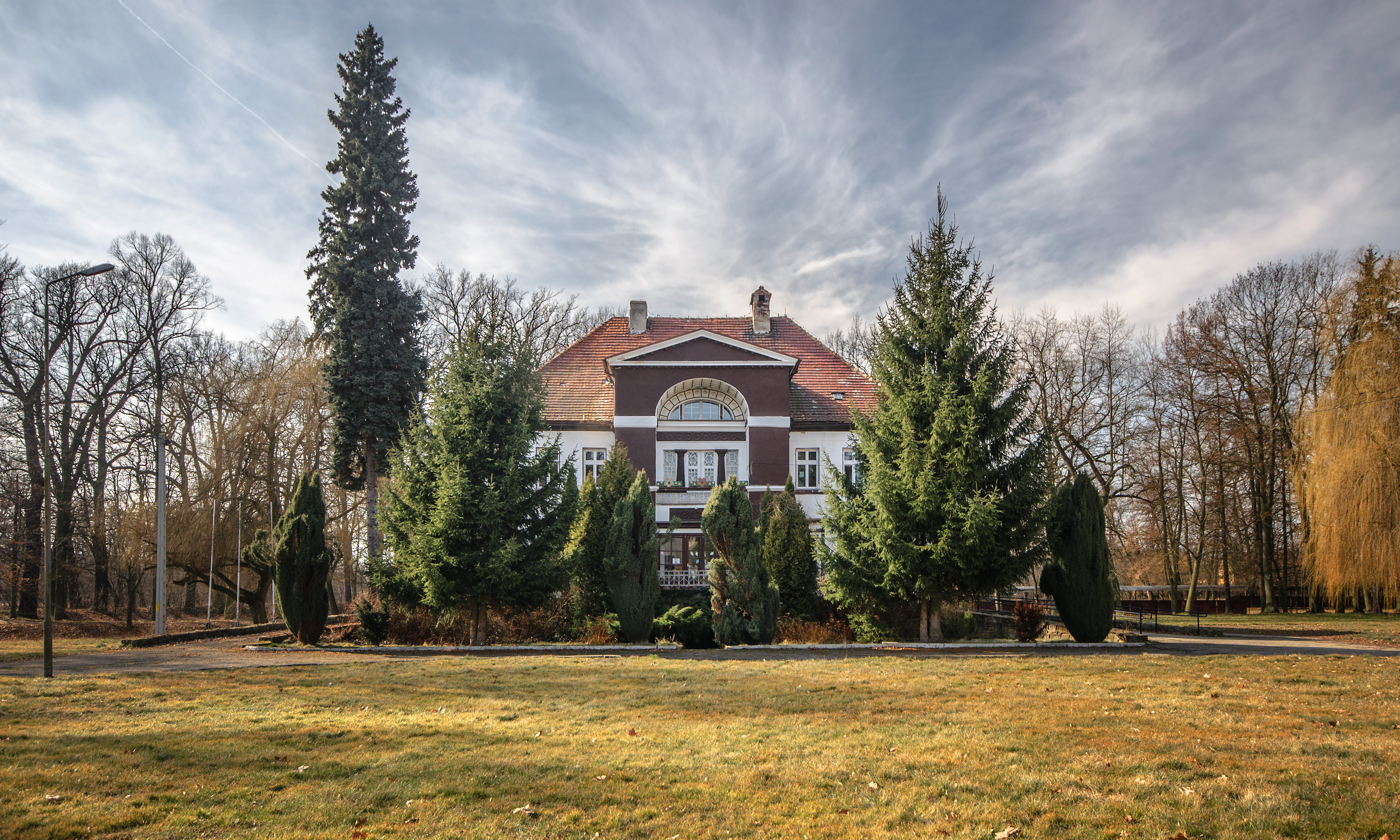

- Location within Poland
- Coordinates: 51°15′57″N 15°53′55″E
- Country: Poland
- Voivodeship: Lower Silesian
- County: Legnica
- Gmina: Chojnów

Piotrowice [pjɔtrɔˈvit͡sɛ] is a village in the administrative district of Gmina Chojnów, within Legnica County, Lower Silesian Voivodeship, in south-western Poland.
