= Jaroszówka, Lower Silesian Voivodeship =

Jaroszówka
- Village
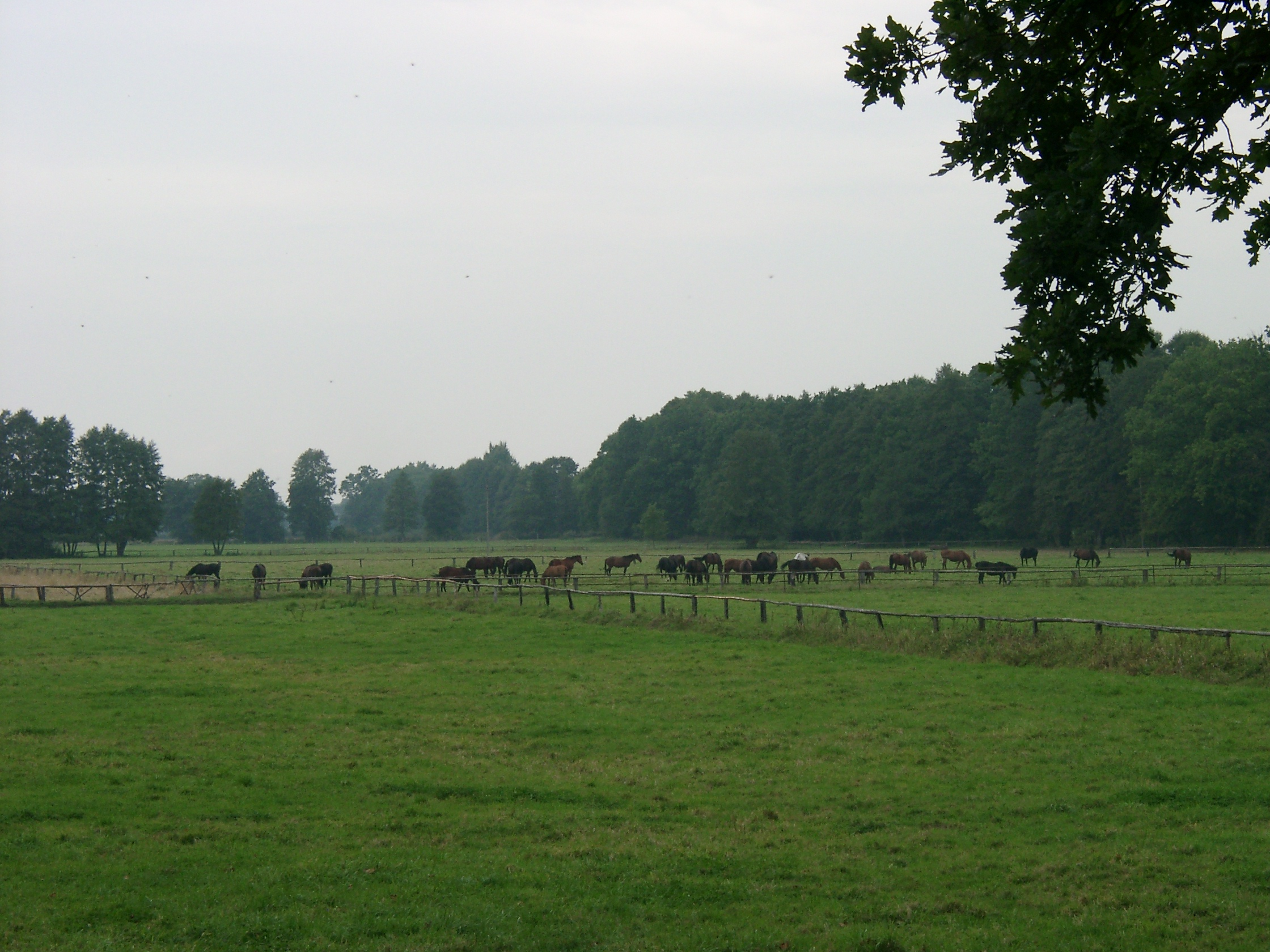
- Horse farm in Jaroszówka

- Location within Poland
- Coordinates: 51°18′55″N 15°59′14″E
- Country: Poland
- Voivodeship: Lower Silesian
- County: Legnica
- Gmina: Chojnów
- Population: 280
- Time zone: UTC+1 (CET)
  - Summer (DST): UTC+2 (CEST)
- Vehicle registration: DLE

Jaroszówka [jarɔˈʂufka] is a village in the administrative district of Gmina Chojnów, within Legnica County, Lower Silesian Voivodeship, in south-western Poland.
