= Stary Łom =

- Village
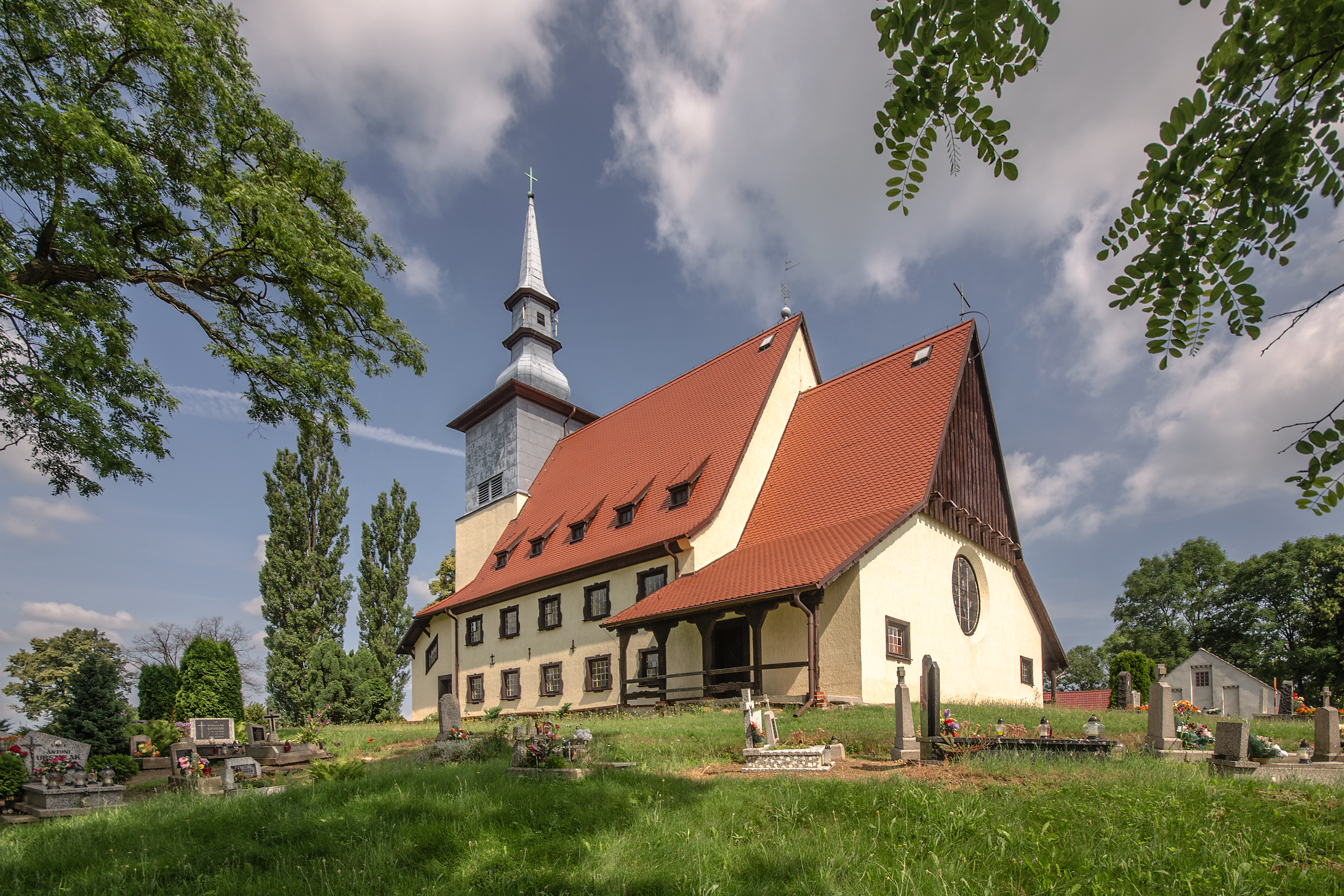
- Saint Anthony church in Stary Łom

- Location within Poland
- Coordinates: 51°19′N 15°48′E
- Country: Poland
- Voivodeship: Lower Silesian
- County: Legnica
- Gmina: Chojnów

Population (approx.)
  - Total: 420
- Time zone: UTC+1 (CET)
  - Summer (DST): UTC+2 (CEST)
- Vehicle registration: DLE

Stary Łom [ˈstarɨ ˈwɔm] is a village in the administrative district of Gmina Chojnów, within Legnica County, Lower Silesian Voivodeship, in south-western Poland.
