= Krzywa, Lower Silesian Voivodeship =

Krzywa
- Village
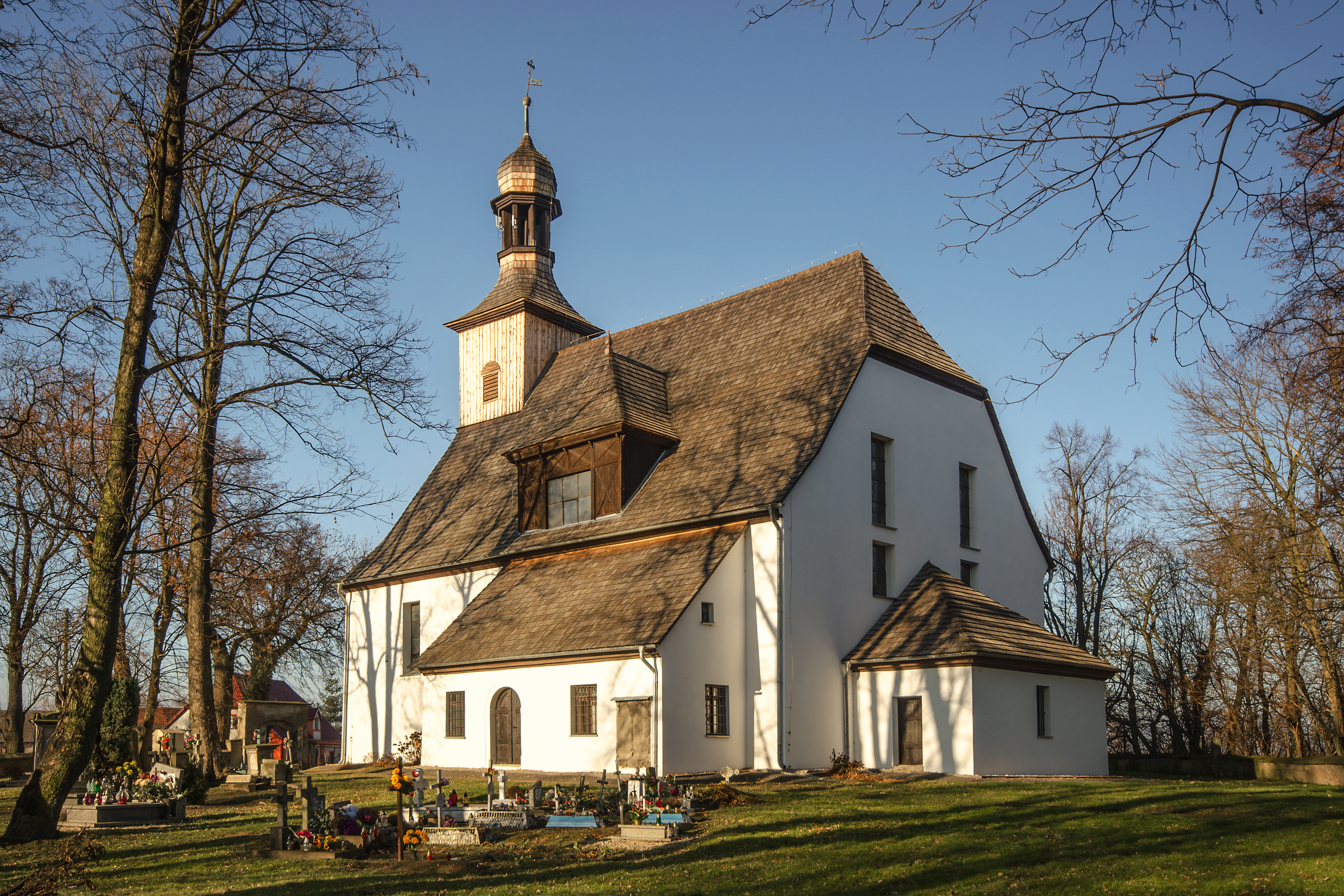

- Location within Poland
- Coordinates: 51°16′57″N 15°48′41″E
- Country: Poland
- Voivodeship: Lower Silesian
- County: Legnica
- Gmina: Chojnów
- Population: 560
- Time zone: UTC+1 (CET)
  - Summer (DST): UTC+2 (CEST)
- Vehicle registration: DLE

Krzywa [ˈkʂɨva] is a village in the administrative district of Gmina Chojnów, within Legnica County, Lower Silesian Voivodeship, in south-western Poland.
