= Dobroszów, Legnica County =

Dobroszów
- Village
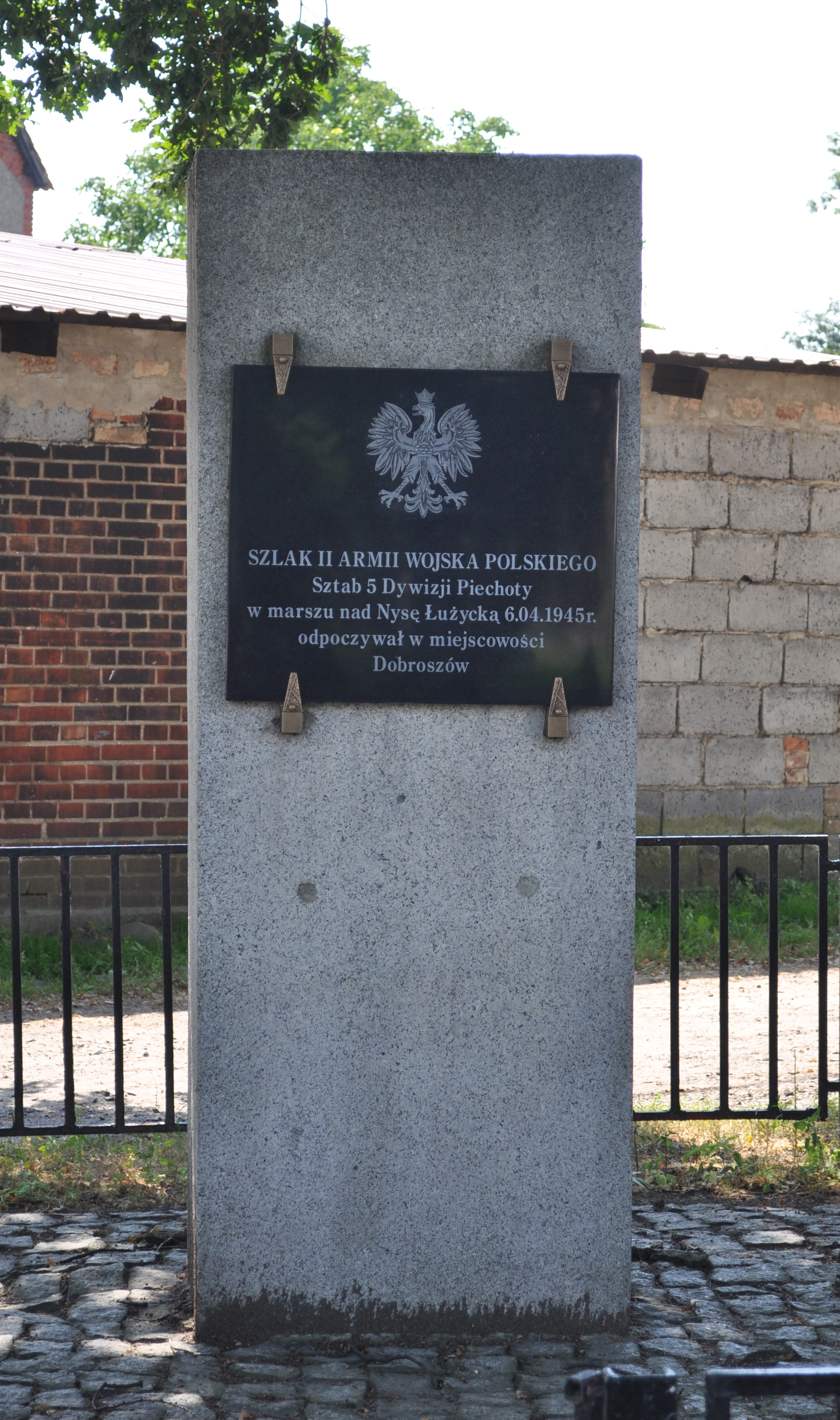
- Memorial to the Second Polish Army

- Location within Poland
- Coordinates: 51°14′54″N 16°00′21″E
- Country: Poland
- Voivodeship: Lower Silesian
- County: Legnica
- Gmina: Chojnów
- Time zone: UTC+1 (CET)
  - Summer (DST): UTC+2 (CEST)
- Vehicle registration: DLE
- Website: https://web.archive.org/web/20060206163523/http://gmina.chojnow.pl/

Dobroszów [dɔˈbrɔʂuf] is a village in the administrative district of Gmina Chojnów, within Legnica County, Lower Silesian Voivodeship, in south-western Poland.
