= Konradówka =

- Village
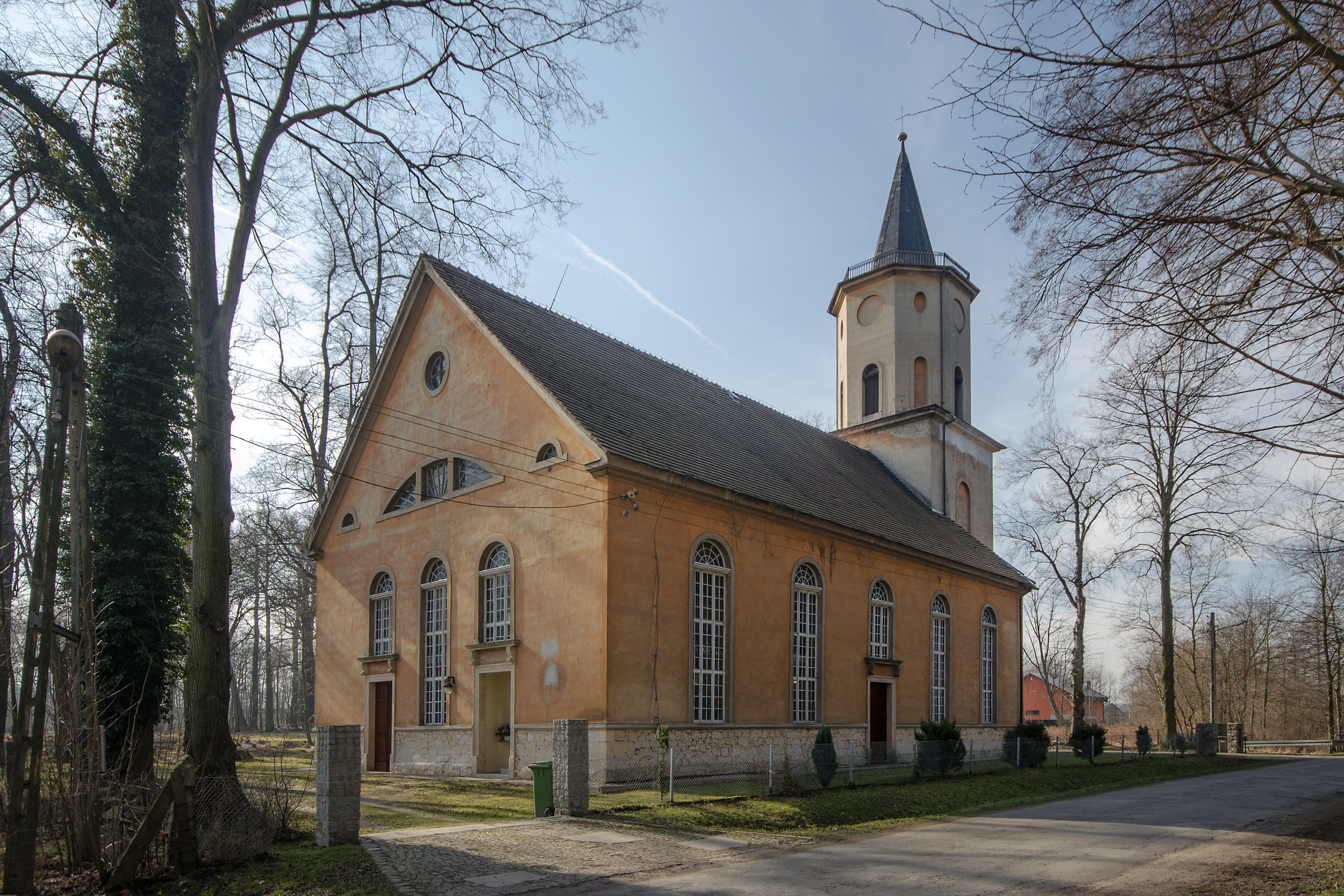
- Michael Archangel church in Konradówka

- Location within Poland
- Coordinates: 51°15′47″N 15°54′9″E
- Country: Poland
- Voivodeship: Lower Silesian
- County: Legnica
- Gmina: Chojnów

Konradówka is a village in the administrative district of Gmina Chojnów, within Legnica County, Lower Silesian Voivodeship, in south-western Poland.
