= Johann Wilhelm Ritter =

German chemist, physicist, and philosopher (1776–1810)

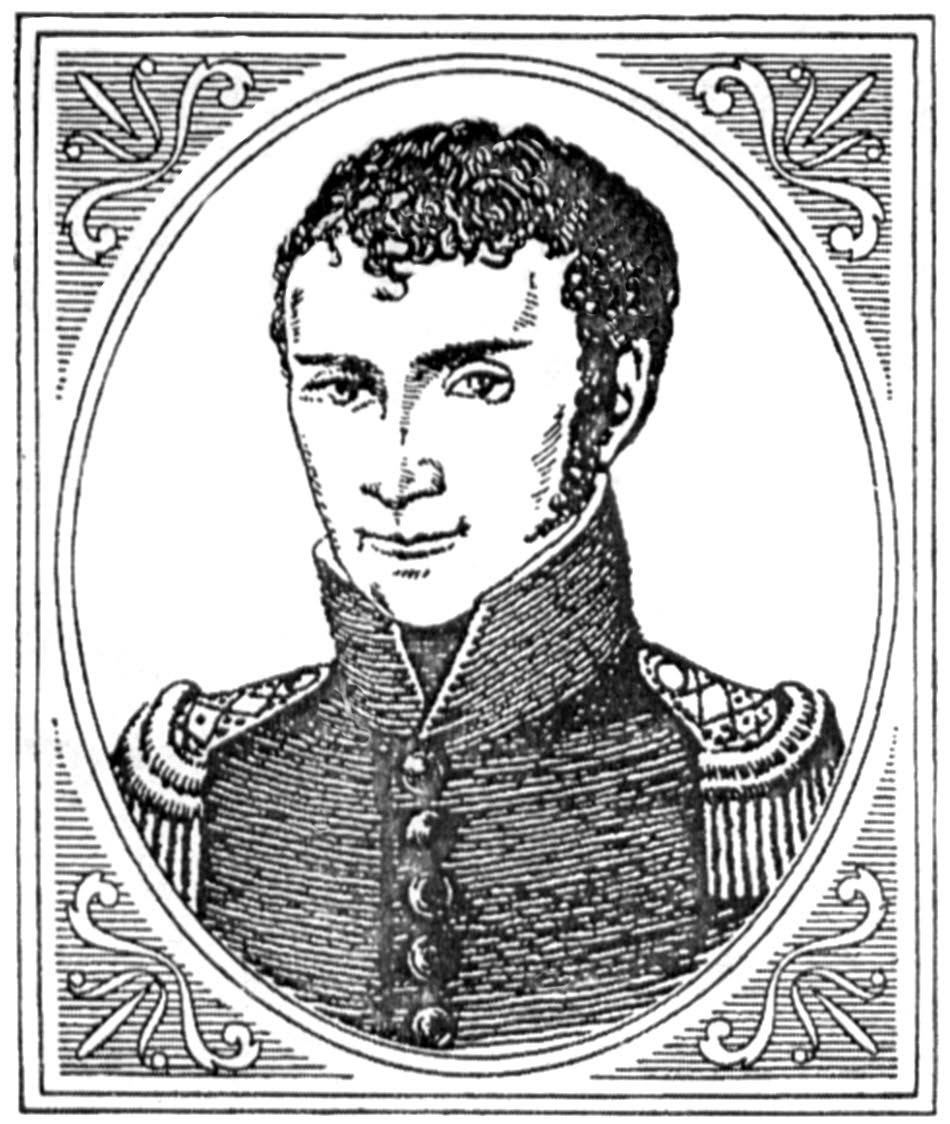
- Ritter in the uniform of the Bavarian Academy of Sciences, about 1804.
- Born: 16 December 1776; Samitz, Margraviate of Brandenburg, Holy Roman Empire
- Died: 23 January 1810 (aged 33); Munich, Bavaria
- Known for: Ultraviolet light Electrolysis; Electroplating
- Scientific career
- Fields: Physics

Johann Wilhelm Ritter (16 December 1776 – 23 January 1810) was a German chemist, physicist and philosopher. He is associated with the German Romanticism. He is also known for discovering the ultraviolet part of the electromagnetic spectrum. He is also credited for the first achieved sustained electrolysis of water and the discovery of electroplating.

== Biography ==
He was born in Samitz (Zamienice) near Haynau (Chojnów) in Silesia (then part of Prussia, since 1945 in Poland), and died in Munich.

=== German Romanticism ===
Ritter belonged to the German Romantic movement. He was personally acquainted with Johann Wolfgang von Goethe, Alexander von Humboldt, Johann Gottfried Herder and Clemens Brentano. He was strongly influenced by Friedrich Wilhelm Joseph Schelling, who was the main philosopher of the Naturphilosophie movement. In 1801, Hans Christian Ørsted visited Jena and became his friend. Several of Ritter's researches were later reported by Ørsted, who was also strongly influenced by the philosophical outlook of Naturphilosophie.

=== Scientific research ===
Johann Wilhelm Ritter's first involvement with science began when he was 14 years old. He became an apprentice to an apothecary in Liegnitz (Legnica), and acquired a deep interest in chemistry. He began medicine studies at the University of Jena in 1796. A self-taught scientist, he made many experimental researches on chemistry, electricity and other fields.

Ritter's first scientific researches concerned some galvanic phenomena. He interpreted the physiological effects observed by Luigi Galvani and other researchers as due to the electricity generated by chemical reactions. His interpretation is closer to the one accepted nowadays than those proposed by Galvani (“animal electricity”) and Alessandro Volta (electricity generated by metallic contact), but it was not accepted at the time.

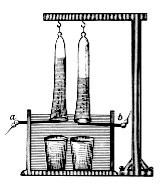
Illustration of an electrolysis apparatus by Ritter, 1800

In 1800, shortly after the invention of the voltaic pile, William Nicholson and Anthony Carlisle discovered that water could be decomposed by electricity. Shortly afterward, Ritter independently discovered the same effect. Besides that, he collected separately and measured the amounts of hydrogen and oxygen produced in the reaction. He also discovered the process of electroplating. In 1802 he built his first electrochemical cell, with 50 copper discs separated by cardboard disks moistened by a salt solution.

Ritter made several self-experiments applying the poles of a voltaic pile to his own hands, eyes, ears, nose and tongue. He also described the difference between the physiological effects of the two poles of the pile, although some of the effects he reported were not confirmed afterwards.

Many of Ritter's researches were guided by a search for polarities in the several "forces" of nature, and for the relation between those "forces" – two of the assumptions of Naturphilosophie. In 1801, after hearing about the discovery of "heat rays" (infrared radiation) by William Herschel (in 1800), Ritter looked for an opposite (cooling) radiation at the other end of the visible spectrum. He did not find exactly what he expected to find, but after a series of attempts he noticed that silver chloride was transformed faster from white to black when it was placed at the dark region of the Sun's spectrum, close to its violet end. The "chemical rays" found by him were afterwards called ultraviolet radiation.

Some of Ritter's researches were acknowledged as important scientific contributions, but he also claimed the discovery of many phenomena that were not confirmed by other researchers. For instance: he reported that the Earth had electric poles that could be detected by the motion of a bimetallic needle; and he claimed that he could produce the electrolysis of water using a series of magnets, instead of Volta's piles.

Ritter had no regular income and never became a university professor, although in 1804 he was elected a member of the Bavarian Academy of Science (in Munich).

=== Personal life and death ===
He married in 1804 and had four children, but he was unable to provide the needs of his family. Plagued by financial difficulties and suffering from weak health (perhaps aggravated by his electrical self-experimentation), he died young in 1810, as a poor man.

== See also ==
- Timeline of hydrogen technologies
- Timeline of particle discoveries

== Sources ==
- Siegfried Zielinski: Electrification, tele-writing, seeing close-up: Johann Wilhelm Ritter, Joseph Chudy, and Jan Evangelista Purkyne, in: Deep Time of the Media. Toward an Archaeology of Hearing and Seeing by Technical Means (Cambridge, MA: MIT Press, 2008), ISBN 978-0-262-74032-6.
