= Pątnów, Lower Silesian Voivodeship =

Pątnów
- Village
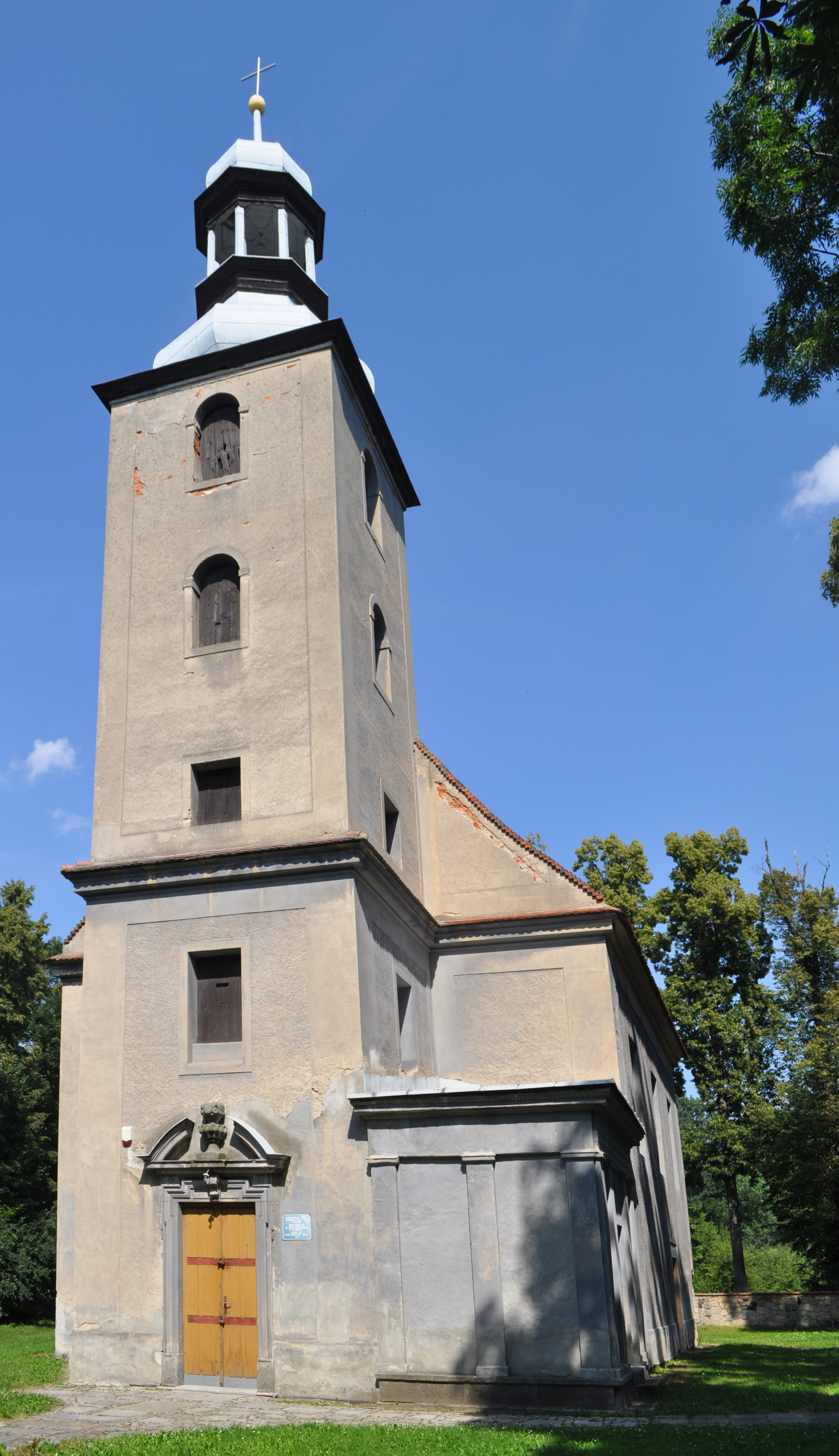
- Saint John the Baptist church in Pątnów

- Location within Poland
- Coordinates: 51°14′N 16°0′E
- Country: Poland
- Voivodeship: Lower Silesian
- County: Legnica
- Gmina: Chojnów
- Time zone: UTC+1 (CET)
  - Summer (DST): UTC+2 (CEST)
- Vehicle registration: DLE

Pątnów [ˈpɔntnuf] is a village in the administrative district of Gmina Chojnów, within Legnica County, Lower Silesian Voivodeship, in south-western Poland.

The village was surely known by 1277, and was mentioned in the medieval Chronica principum Poloniae.

== Transport ==
The A4 motorway runs nearby, southwest of the village, and the National road 94 passes nearby, north of the village.
