= Zamienice =

- Village
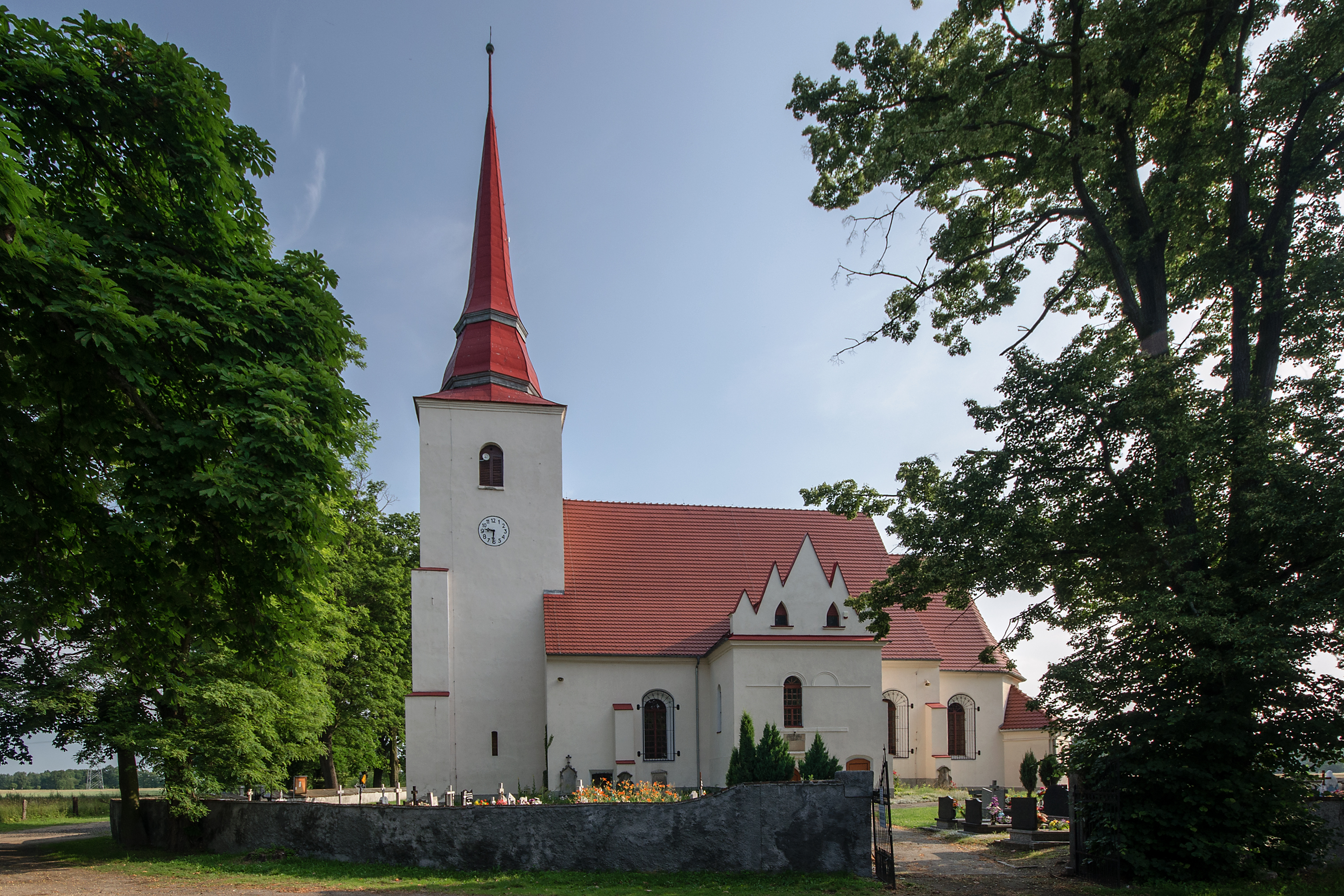
- Ascension of Lady Mary Church

- Location within Poland
- Coordinates: 51°19′N 15°57′E
- Country: Poland
- Voivodeship: Lower Silesian
- County: Legnica
- Gmina: Chojnów

Population (2011)
  - Total: 311
- Time zone: UTC+1 (CET)
  - Summer (DST): UTC+2 (CEST)
- Vehicle registration: DLE

Zamienice [zamjɛˈnit͡sɛ] is a village in the administrative district of Gmina Chojnów, within Legnica County, Lower Silesian Voivodeship, in south-western Poland.

== Notable people ==
- Johann Wilhelm Ritter (1776-1810), chemist and physicist
