= Goliszów =

- Village
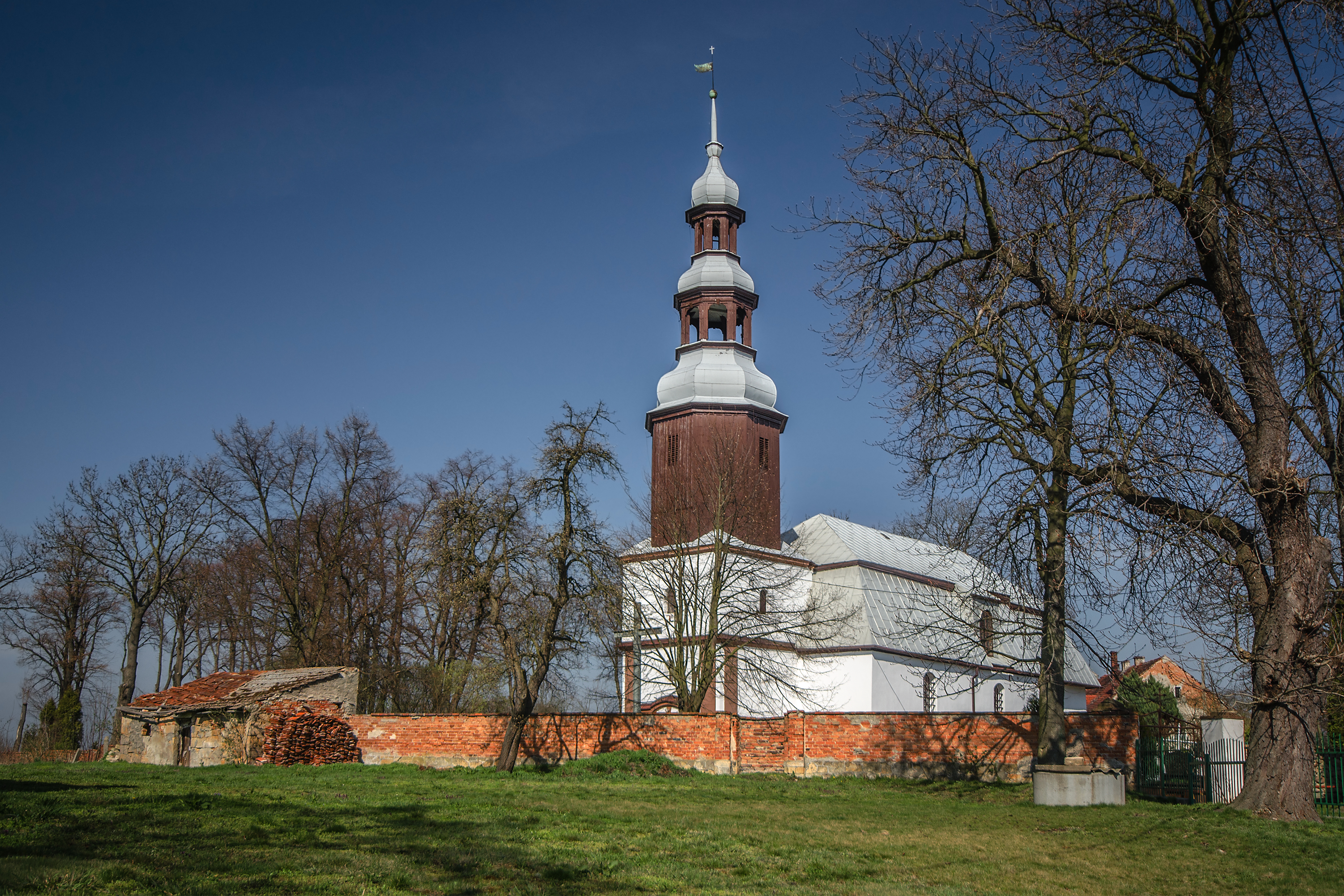
- Church of the Nativity of the Holy Virgin Mary

- Location within Poland
- Coordinates: 51°16′42″N 15°58′41″E
- Country: Poland
- Voivodeship: Lower Silesian
- County: Legnica
- Gmina: Chojnów

Population
  - Total: 770
- Time zone: UTC+1 (CET)
  - Summer (DST): UTC+2 (CEST)
- Vehicle registration: DLE

Goliszów [ɡɔˈliʂuf] is a village in the administrative district of Gmina Chojnów, within Legnica County, Lower Silesian Voivodeship, in south-western Poland.
