= Osetnica =

- Village
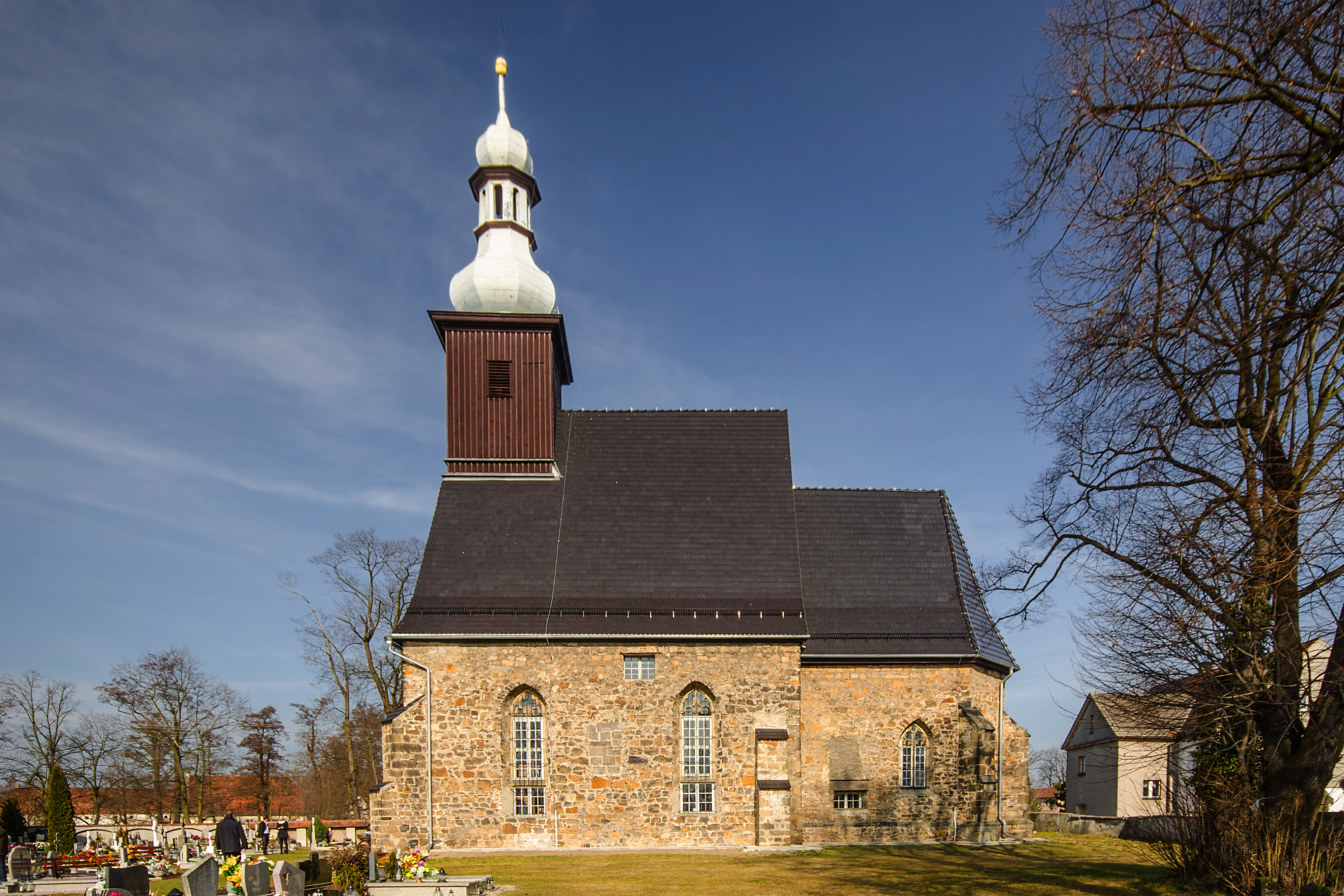
- Saint Anne church in Osetnica

- Location within Poland
- Coordinates: 51°15′34″N 15°52′21″E
- Country: Poland
- Voivodeship: Lower Silesian
- County: Legnica
- Gmina: Chojnów
- Time zone: UTC+1 (CET)
  - Summer (DST): UTC+2 (CEST)
- Vehicle registration: DLE

Osetnica [ɔsɛtˈnit͡sa] is a village in the administrative district of Gmina Chojnów, within Legnica County, Lower Silesian Voivodeship, in south-western Poland.
