= Niedźwiedzice, Legnica County =

Niedźwiedzice
- Village
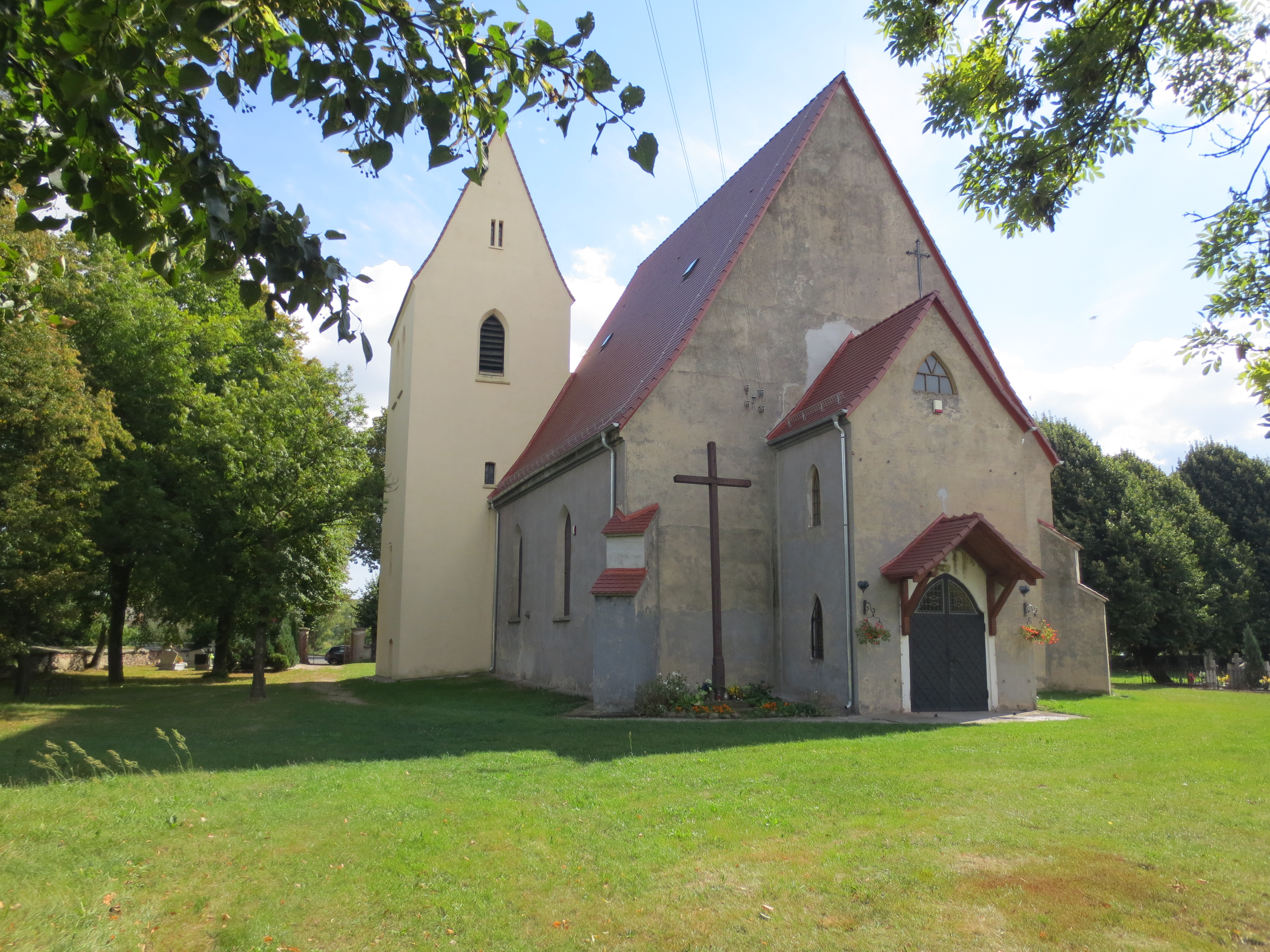
- Church of Saint Anthony

- Location within Poland
- Coordinates: 51°17′N 16°2′E
- Country: Poland
- Voivodeship: Lower Silesian
- County: Legnica
- Gmina: Chojnów

Niedźwiedzice [ɲɛd͡ʑvjɛˈd͡ʑit͡sɛ] is a village in the administrative district of Gmina Chojnów, within Legnica County, Lower Silesian Voivodeship, in south-western Poland.
