= Gmina Chojnów =

Gmina Chojnów Chojnów Commune
- Gmina
- Flag Coat of arms

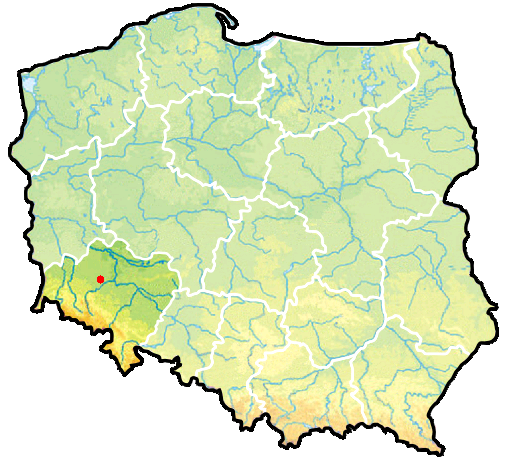
- Coordinates (Chojnów): 51°16′N 15°56′E
- Country: Poland
- Voivodeship: Lower Silesian
- County: Legnica
- Seat: Chojnów
- Sołectwos: Biała, Biskupin, Budziwojów, Czernikowice, Dobroszów, Dzwonów, Gołaczów, Goliszów, Gołocin, Groble, Jaroszówka, Jerzmanowice, Kondradówka, Krzywa, Michów, Niedźwiedzice, Okmiany, Osetnica, Pawlikowice, Piotrowice, Rokitki, Stary Łom, Strupice, Witków, Zamienice

Area
  - Total: 231.17 km^{2} (89.26 sq mi)

Population (2019-06-30)
  - Total: 9,634
  - Density: 41.67/km^{2} (107.9/sq mi)
- Website: http://www.gmina-chojnow.pl/

Gmina Chojnów is a rural gmina (administrative district) in Legnica County, Lower Silesian Voivodeship, in south-western Poland. Its seat is the town of Chojnów, although the town is not part of the territory of the gmina.

The gmina covers an area of 231.17 square kilometres (89.3 sq mi), and as of 2019 its total population is 9,634.

== Neighbouring gminas ==
Gmina Chojnów is bordered by the town of Chojnów and the gminas of Chocianów, Gromadka, Lubin, Miłkowice, Warta Bolesławiecka, Zagrodno and Złotoryja.

== Villages ==
The gmina contains the villages of Biała, Biskupin, Brzozy, Budziwojów, Czernikowice, Dębrzyno, Dobroszów, Dzwonów, Gołaczów, Goliszów, Gołocin, Groble, Jaroszówka, Jerzmanowice, Kobiałka, Kolonia Kołłątaja, Konradówka, Krzywa, Michów, Niedźwiedzice, Okmiany, Osetnica, Pątnów, Pawlikowice, Piotrowice, Rokitki, Stary Łom, Strupice, Witków, Witkówek and Zamienice.
