= Czarna Woda (Kaczawa) =

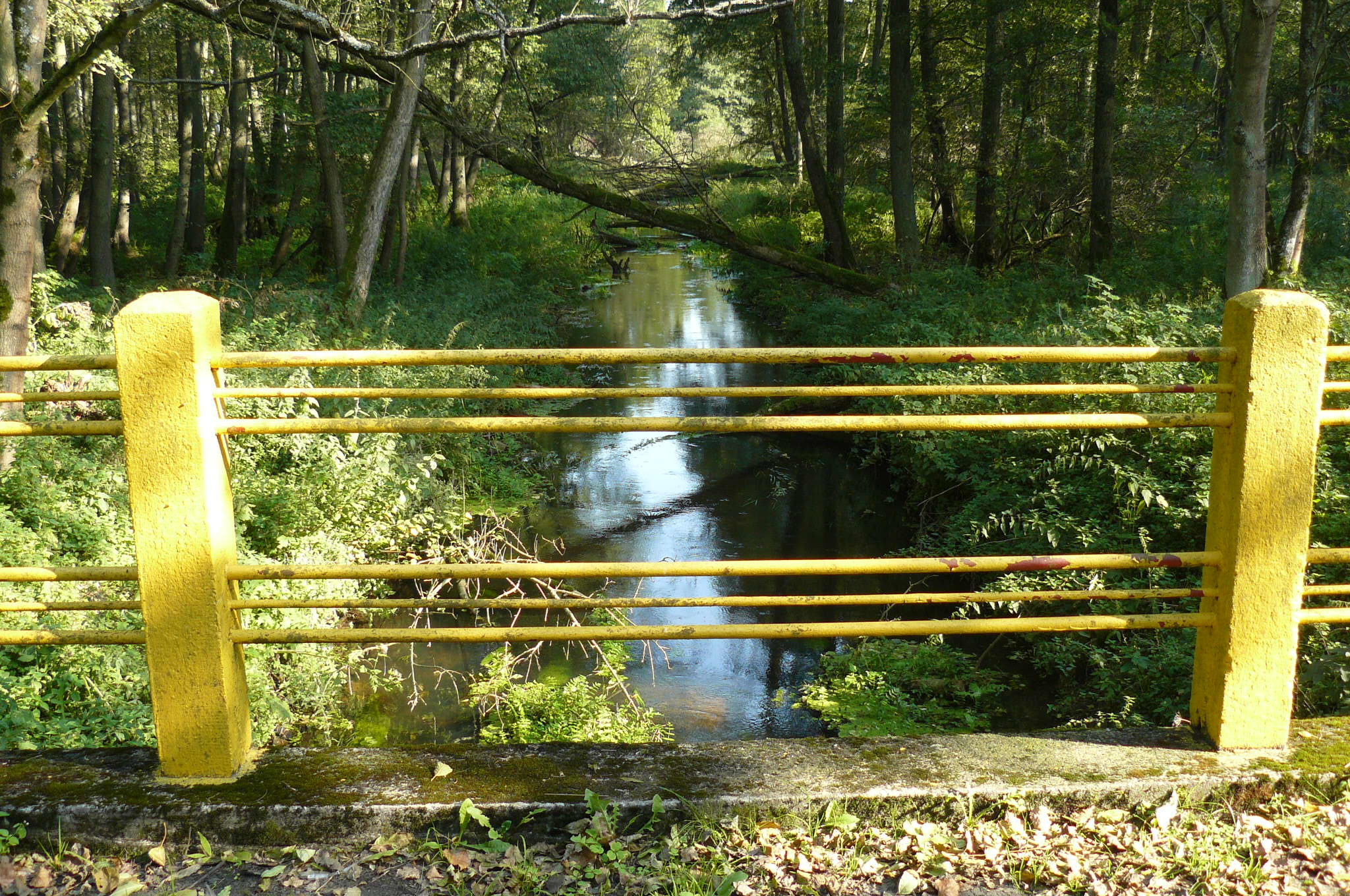
- Czarna Woda River

Location
- Country: Poland
- Voivodeship: Lower Silesian

Physical characteristics
- Source
  - location: west of Wierzbowa, Bolesławiec County
  - coordinates: 51°24′00″N 15°41′53″E
  - elevation: 151 m (495 ft)
- Mouth: Kaczawa
  - location: Legnica
  - coordinates: 51°13′23″N 16°10′45″E
  - elevation: 114.1 m (374 ft)
- Length: 47.15 km (29.30 mi)
- Basin size: 985 km^{2} (380 mi^{2})

Basin features
- Progression: Kaczawa→ Oder→ Baltic Sea

The Czarna Woda (lit. 'black water') is a river of Poland, a tributary of the Kaczawa, which it meets in Legnica. The Czarna Woda is 48km long. It flows through Lower Silesian Voivodeship and has waterfalls in Legnica. The river also flows through marshes at Wierzbowskie taking a westerly direction from the village of Wierzbowa. The river flows through Legnica District. Its main tributaries are the Skora and Siekierna Rivers.

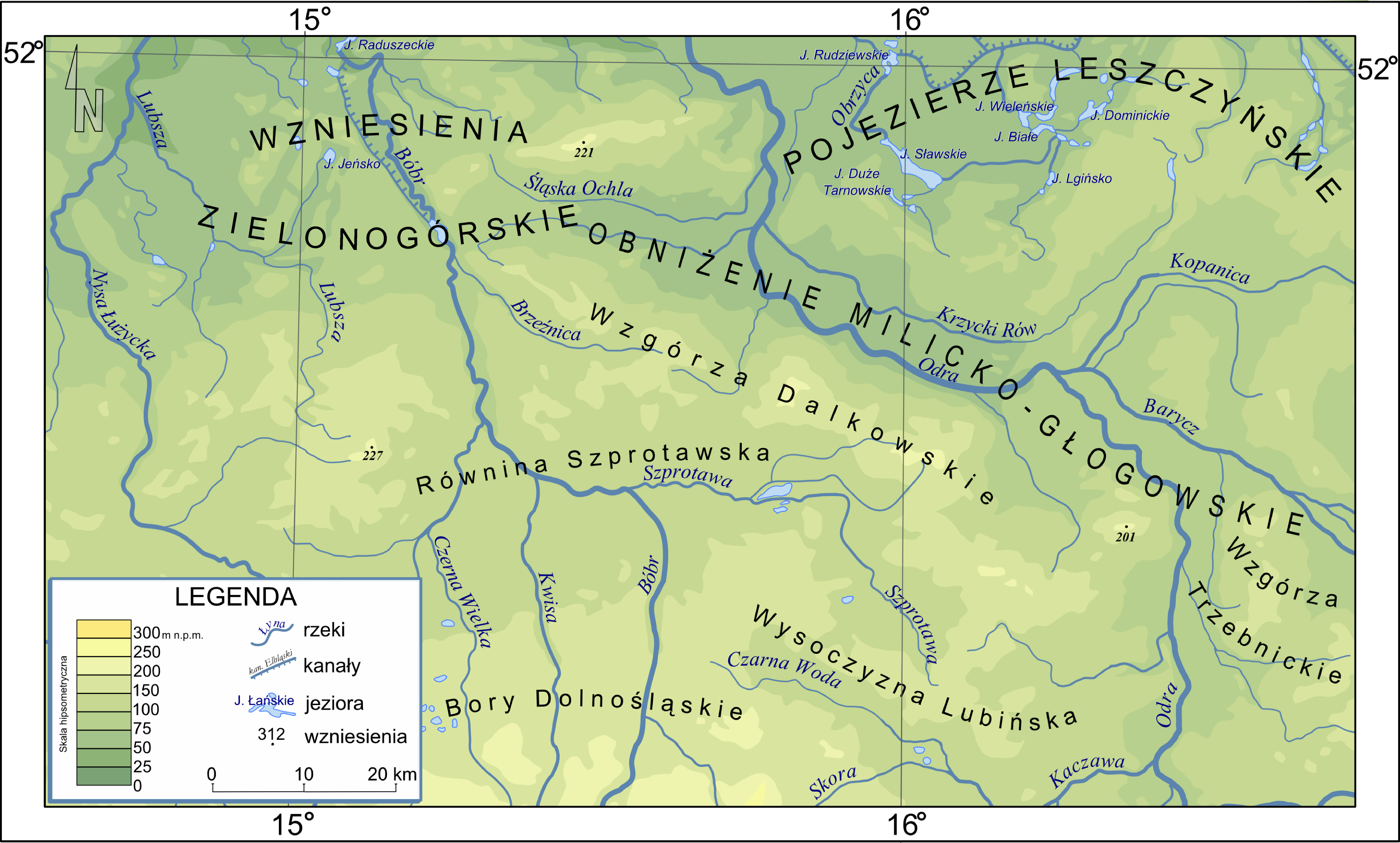
Map of the river

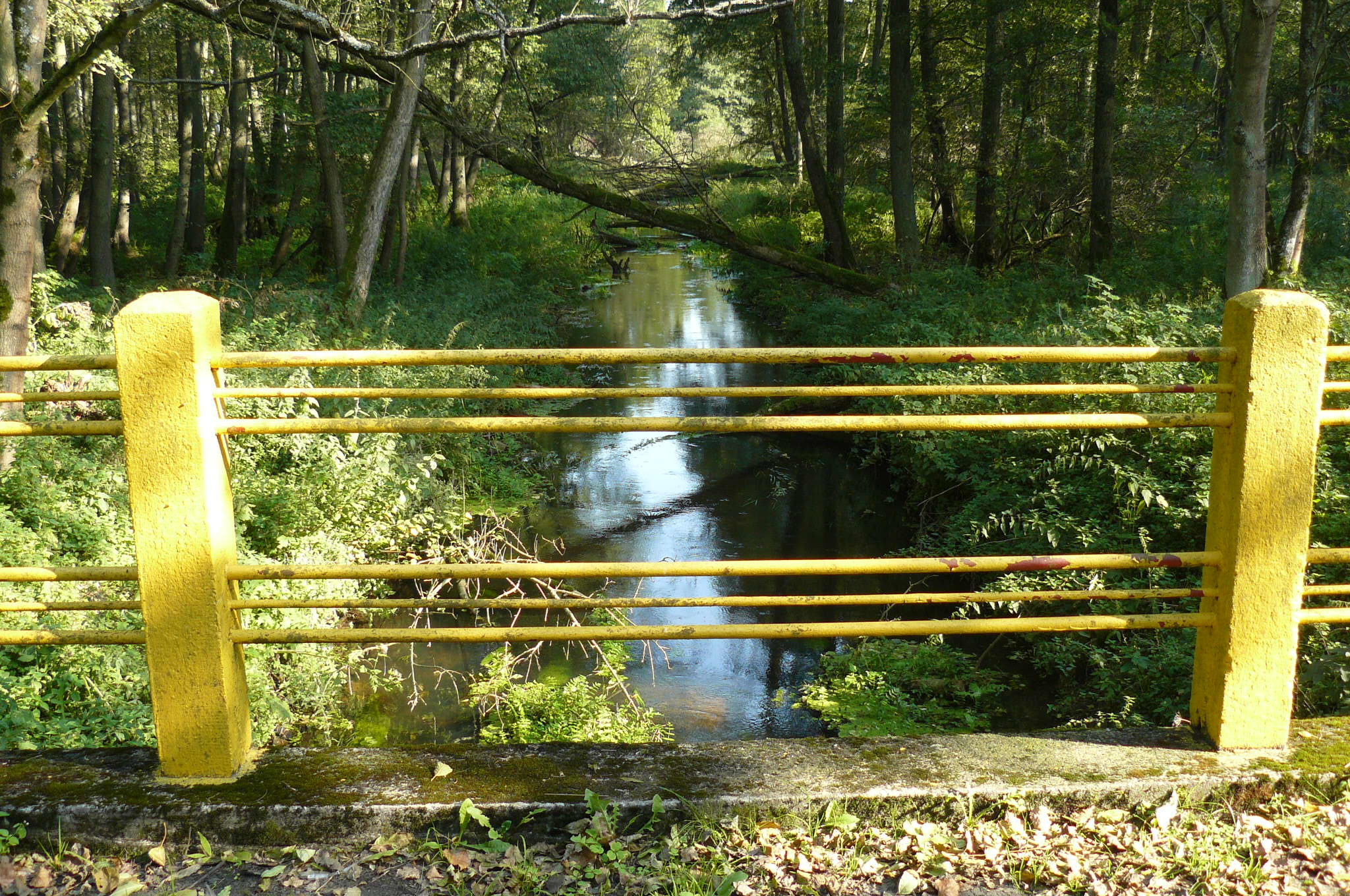
Czarna Woda river

Towns on the river include Wierzbowa, Rokitki, Grzymalin, Bukowna, Rzeszotary and Legnica.
