= Anna Ekielska-Skóra =

Polish flautist and social activist (born 1976)

- Born: 15 December 1976 (age 49); Kraków
- Citizenship: Polish
- Education: Academy of Music in Kraków
- Occupations: flautist, social activist

Anna Ekielska-Skóra (born 15 December 1976) is a Polish flautist and social activist, from 2008 first flautist of the orchestra of the Baltic Opera in Gdańsk, from 2015 leader of the activist TAK Choir, from 2019 member of the board of the Tolerado association advocating LGBT rights.

== Biography ==
=== Family ===
Born in 1976 in Kraków, daughter of the pianist Elżbieta née Ekielska; granddaughter of Eustachy Ekielski; great-granddaughter of Władysław Ekielski.

=== Education ===
In 1996–2003 she studied at the Academy of Music in Kraków, where she graduated with distinction from the flute class of professor Kazimierz Moszyński. During her studies, she participated in master classes conducted by, among others, Mirjam Nastasi, James Galway, Peter-Lukas Graf, János Bálint and Jiri Valek.

=== Music work ===
After graduation, she and her mother played in a classical trio on a ship sailing in the Caribbean Sea for almost four years. Then for two years she worked with the Opera at the Castle (Opera na Zamku) in Szczecin, as the first flautist and concertmaster of the woodwind group. At that time, she taught in two music schools in Szczecin: the Leonard Piwonia Private Secondary Music School and the 1st Degree General Music School.

In 2002, together with the Orchestra of the Academy of Music in Kraków and Malwina Lipiec (harp), she recorded W. A. Mozart's Concerto for Flute, Harp, and Orchestra for Radio Kraków.

In 2008, she started working as the first flautist of the orchestra of the Baltic Opera in Gdańsk. From the beginning of her stay in the Tricity, she began cooperation with the Polish Chamber Philharmonic Orchestra Sopot. From April 2015, she also started cooperation with the Baltic Philharmonic. She regularly cooperated with the Kraków Opera and the Kraków Philharmonic, and continued cooperation with the Opera at the Castle in Szczecin. She has toured Europe and Asia with these orchestras. She co-founded the Trickster Quartet.

=== Social activism ===
In August 2015, she started running the amateur, activist TAK Choir organized by the Tricity Women's Action (Trójmiejska Akcja Kobieca) at the Krytyka Polityczna common-room in Gdańsk. The choir was created in an open formula, like the Kraków Revolutionary Choir, to take part in events aimed at “building an equal and diverse society”, in political demonstrations and happenings commenting on local city initiatives, including through the original performance of famous hits. The choir performed, among others at the Pomeranian Women's Congress, the Tricity Equality March and during protests against the violation of the rule of law and the independence of judiciary by Law and Justice.

She became involved in activism advocating LGBT rights. From September 2019, she is a member of the board of the Tolerado association. In 2020, along with other Tolerado members, she took part in protests by LGBT people in Gdańsk.

She collaborated with Polish MP Joanna Senyszyn.

== Awards ==
- 1st place in the OESTIG-Preise category in Vienna (2002), where the award included recording for Wien National Rundfunk
- Honorable Mention at the National Competition for French Music Interpretation in Łódź
- 2nd place at the Macroregional Auditions for Woodwind Instruments in Lublin
- 4th place at the National Auditions for Woodwind Instruments in Olsztyn
