= Legnica County =

Coordinates: 51°13′N 16°10′E

Legnica County Powiat legnicki
- County
- Flag Coat of arms

- Location within the voivodeship

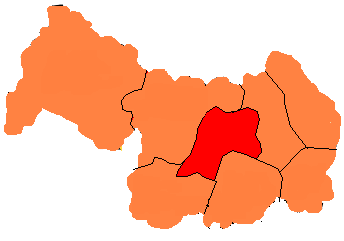
- Division into gminas (the red portion is the city of Legnica)
- Country: Poland
- Voivodeship: Lower Silesian
- Seat: Legnica
- Gminas: Total 8 (incl. 1 urban): Chojnów; Gmina Chojnów; Gmina Krotoszyce; Gmina Kunice; Gmina Legnickie Pole; Gmina Milkowice; Gmina Prochowice; Gmina Ruja

Area
  - Total: 744.6 km^{2} (287.5 sq mi)

Population (2019-06-30)
  - Total: 55,318
  - Density: 74.29/km^{2} (192.4/sq mi)
  - Urban: 16,957
  - Rural: 38,361
- Time zone: UTC+1 (CET)
  - Summer (DST): UTC+2 (CEST)
- Car plates: DLE
- Website: www.powiat-legnicki.eu

Legnica County (Polish: powiat legnicki) is a unit of territorial administration and local government (powiat) in Lower Silesian Voivodeship, south-western Poland. It came into being on January 1, 1999, as a result of the Polish local government reforms passed in 1998. The county covers an area of 744.6 square kilometres (287.5 sq mi). Its administrative seat is the city of Legnica, although this city is not part of the county (it forms a separate city county, which is an enclave within Legnica County). The only towns in Legnica County are Chojnów and Prochowice.

As at 2019 the total population of the county is 55,318, out of which the population of Chojnów is 13,355, the population of Prochowice is 3,602, and the rural population is 38,361. The majority of the population is polish but there is a small German minority at 0.02% of the population mostly in Koiszków (Koischkau).

== Neighbouring counties ==
Apart from the city of Legnica, Legnica County is also bordered by Polkowice County and Lubin County to the north, Wołów County and Środa County to the east, Jawor County to the south, and Złotoryja County and Bolesławiec County to the west.

== Administrative divisions ==
The county is subdivided into eight gminas (one urban, one urban-rural and six rural). These are listed in the following table, in descending order of population.

Gmina	Type	Area (km^{2})	Population (2019)	Seat
Chojnów	urban	5.3	13,355	
Gmina Chojnów	rural	231.2	9,634	Chojnów*
Gmina Prochowice	urban-rural	102.6	7,450	Prochowice
Gmina Kunice	rural	92.8	6,960	Kunice
Gmina Miłkowice	rural	86.4	6,721	Miłkowice
Gmina Legnickie Pole	rural	85.4	5,233	Legnickie Pole
Gmina Krotoszyce	rural	67.6	3,326	Krotoszyce
Gmina Ruja	rural	73.4	2,639	Ruja
* seat not part of the gmina
