= Janowiec (disambiguation) =

Janowiec (Janowiec nad Wisłą) is a village in Lublin Voivodeship (east Poland).

Janowiec may also refer to:

- Janowiec, Lower Silesian Voivodeship (south-west Poland)
- Janowiec, Łódź Voivodeship (central Poland)
- Janowiec, Subcarpathian Voivodeship (south-east Poland)
- Janowiec, Zielona Góra County in Lubusz Voivodeship (west Poland)
- Janowiec, Pomeranian Voivodeship (north Poland)
- Janowiec, Warmian-Masurian Voivodeship (north Poland)
- Janówiec, West Pomeranian Voivodeship (north-west Poland)

== See also ==
- Janovice
- Janowitz
- Janowice (disambiguation)
