= Janowice =

Janowice may refer to:

- Janowice, Lower Silesian Voivodeship (south-west Poland)
- Janowice, Włocławek County in Kuyavian-Pomeranian Voivodeship (central Poland)
- Janowice, Łęczyca County in Łódź Voivodeship (central Poland)
- Janowice, Łowicz County in Łódź Voivodeship (central Poland)
- Janowice, Pabianice County in Łódź Voivodeship (central Poland)
- Janowice, Puławy County in Lublin Voivodeship (east Poland)
- Janowice, Świdnik County in Lublin Voivodeship (east Poland)
- Janowice, Limanowa County in Lesser Poland Voivodeship (south Poland)
- Janowice, Miechów County in Lesser Poland Voivodeship (south Poland)
- Janowice, Tarnów County in Lesser Poland Voivodeship (south Poland)
- Janowice, Wieliczka County in Lesser Poland Voivodeship (south Poland)
- Janowice, Silesian Voivodeship (south Poland)
- Janowice, Opatów County in Świętokrzyskie Voivodeship (south-central Poland)
- Janowice, Ostrowiec County in Świętokrzyskie Voivodeship (south-central Poland)
- Janowice, Sandomierz County in Świętokrzyskie Voivodeship (south-central Poland)
- Janowice, Koło County in Greater Poland Voivodeship (central Poland)
- Janowice, Gmina Sompolno in Greater Poland Voivodeship (central Poland)
- Janowice, Gmina Stare Miasto in Greater Poland Voivodeship (central Poland)
- Janowice, Gmina Wierzbinek in Greater Poland Voivodeship (central Poland)
- Janowice, Lubusz Voivodeship (west Poland)
- Janowice, Pomeranian Voivodeship (north Poland)

== See also ==
- Janovice
- Janowiec (disambiguation)
- Janowitz
