= Ruja (disambiguation) =

Ruja may refer to:

- Ruja, an Estonian rock band

- Ruja (EP), an EP by Ruja
- Ruja (album), an LP by Ruja

- Ruja, Lower Silesian Voivodeship, a village in Lower Silesian Voivodeship, south-western Poland
- Ruja, a village in Agnita town, Sibiu County, Romania
- Ruja (Siret), a tributary of the Siret in Iași County, Romania
- Ruja (Tazlăul Sărat), a tributary of the Tazlăul Sărat in Bacău County, Romania
- Rūja, river in Latvia
- Ruja Ignatova (born 1980), Bulgarian-German convicted fraudster
