= Janowicz =

Janowicz (Polish pronunciation: [jaˈnɔvit͡ʂ]) is a Polish language patronymic surname of East Slavic origin, literslly meaning "son of Jan". The Yiddish-language variant is Janowitz. Notable bearers include:

- Jerzy Janowicz (born 1990), Polish professional tennis player
- Ryszard Pędrak-Janowicz (1932–2004), Polish luger
- Sokrat Janowicz (1936–2013), Polish writer of Belarusian descent
- Victor Felix "Vic" Janowicz (1930–1996), American football halfback
