= Rogoźnik =

Rogoźnik may refer to the following places in Poland:

- Rogoźnik, Lower Silesian Voivodeship (south-west Poland)
- Rogoźnik, Lesser Poland Voivodeship (south Poland)
- Rogoźnik, Silesian Voivodeship (south Poland)
