= Rujiena Castle =

Former castle in Latvia

- Rujiena, Latvia
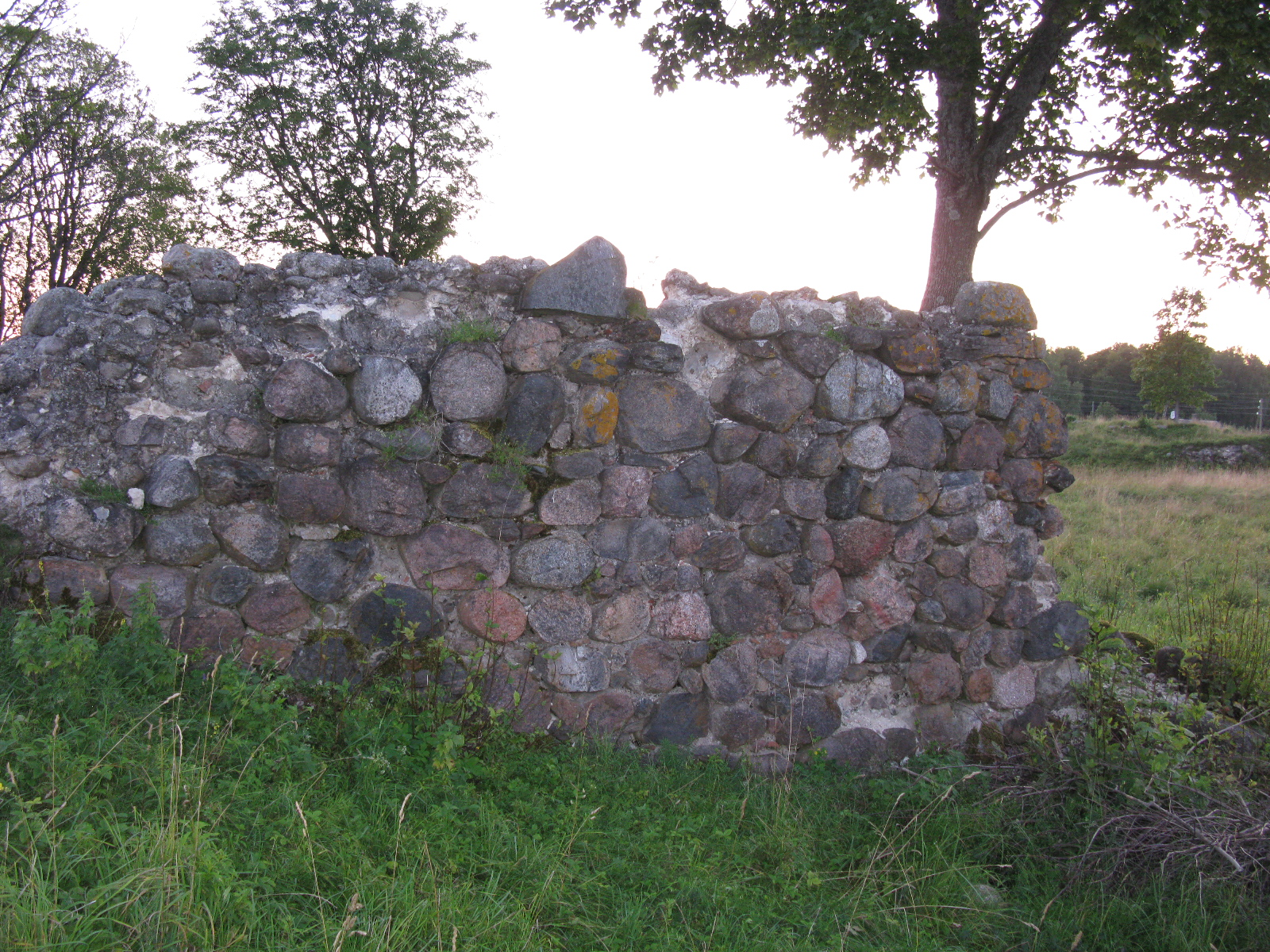
- Remains of the Ruensburg order castle

Site information
- Type: Castle
- Condition: Ruins

Location
- Coordinates: 57.881944°N 25.369444°E

Site history
- Built: 1263
- Built by: Livonian Order
- Demolished: 1704

The ruins of the Latvian hill castle Rujiena Castle are located on the edge of the present-day village of Rūjiena in Valmiera Municipality in the Vidzeme region, on the right bank of the Rūja river.

== History ==
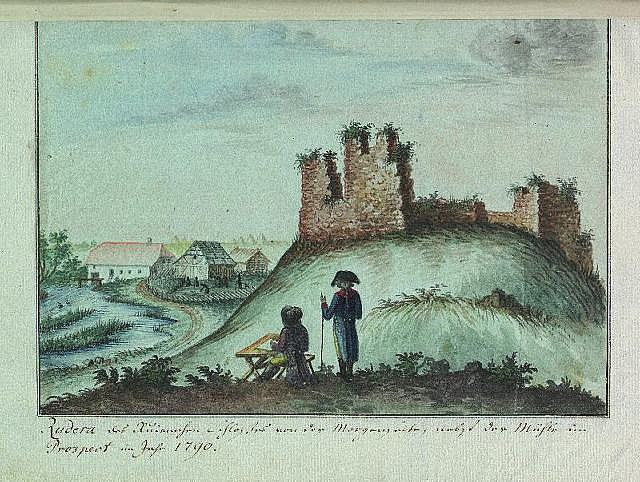
View of the ruins in 1790.

Historic chronicles dating from 1125 tell of the wooden Livonian Castle, Metsepole, located on the right bank of the Rūja River, about 3 km (1.9 mi) from the current centre of the town, and how it was destroyed by invading forces from Saaremaa. The region submitted to the Livonian Brothers of the Sword after the Battle of St. Matthew's Day.

The wooden Livonian castle was replaced with a castle built by Landmeister of the Teutonic Order Burchard von Hornhausen in 1263. A substantial settlement was established around the castle and named Rūjiena. Rūjiena Castle guarded the border between the Teutonic Order and the dominion of the Archbishopric of Riga.

The castle as an order castle of the Livonian Order was first mentioned in 1499. Their castle area not only included the parish of Rūjiena, but also the part of the parish of Salisburg on the right bank of the Salis. Rūjiena shared a bailiff with Karkus and Heimat. The Rūjiena crochet mill was called oppidum in 1555.

During the reign of Ivan III of Russia, Rūjiena Castle was repeatedly attacked by Russian troops and destroyed in 1481. It did not suffer major damage and Rūjiena quickly recovered. In 1526 Walter von Plettenberg, Master of the Teutonic Order, called a provincial assembly to try Archbishop Johannes VII Blankenfeld for his relationship with Russia. Rūjiena's importance grew and the castle was raised to the rank of commandery. Heinrich von Galen was its only commander. He died in 1557 and so did not see its destruction by the Russians in 1560. During the Livonian War in 1560, the castle was occupied, looted and burned by the Lithuanian nobility, but was then restored. In September 1560, the Russian army under Ivan the Terrible destroyed Rūjiena Castle and the town. After Vidzeme was partitioned to Poland in 1562, the Polish king Sigismund August presented Rūjiena to his brother-in-law, Swedish prince John. The occupation of the castle surrendered in 1575 King Magnus, but in the autumn of 1575 the Germans managed to take them back. Rūjiena was still called a castle in 1554 but it military value was slighted in 1582.

In 1622, King Gustavus Adolphus liened the castle to his financial administrator, Jasper Mattsson Krus. Rūjiena Castle was completely destroyed during the Great Northern War in 1704. Time has destroyed what little was left, and many of the remaining stones were taken by locals to build the dam for the mill.

== Description ==
The oval castle complex indicates that there used to be a Wallburg at the site of the castle. The castle hill is located on the right bank of the river Rūja, surrounded by a deep ditch with a bridge on the west side. Rūjiena Castle was a typical Mantelmauer fortress. The only square tower, on the north side, leans against the wall.

== Castle names ==
Over the course of history, the castle was referred to in different documents under several names.

- 1414 – Ruyen
- 1437 – Rugen
- 1461 – Ruien, Rugen
- 1495 – Rughen
- 1496 – Rugenn
- 1499 – Rwen
- 16th century – Rujen
- 1573 – Royen

== Present condition ==
Fragments made of enceinte from 1 to 2 m (3 ft 3 in to 6 ft 7 in) in height have been preserved from the ring wall. There has been an increase in the terrain from the gatehouse. There are no information boards on site and the castle is not on the list of local attractions.

== See also ==
- Rūjiena
