= Laskówka =

Laskówka may refer to the following places in Poland:

- Laskówka, Lower Silesian Voivodeship (south-west Poland)
- Laskówka, Subcarpathian Voivodeship (south-east Poland)
