= Brzeźnica, Lower Silesian Voivodeship =

Brzeźnica
- Village
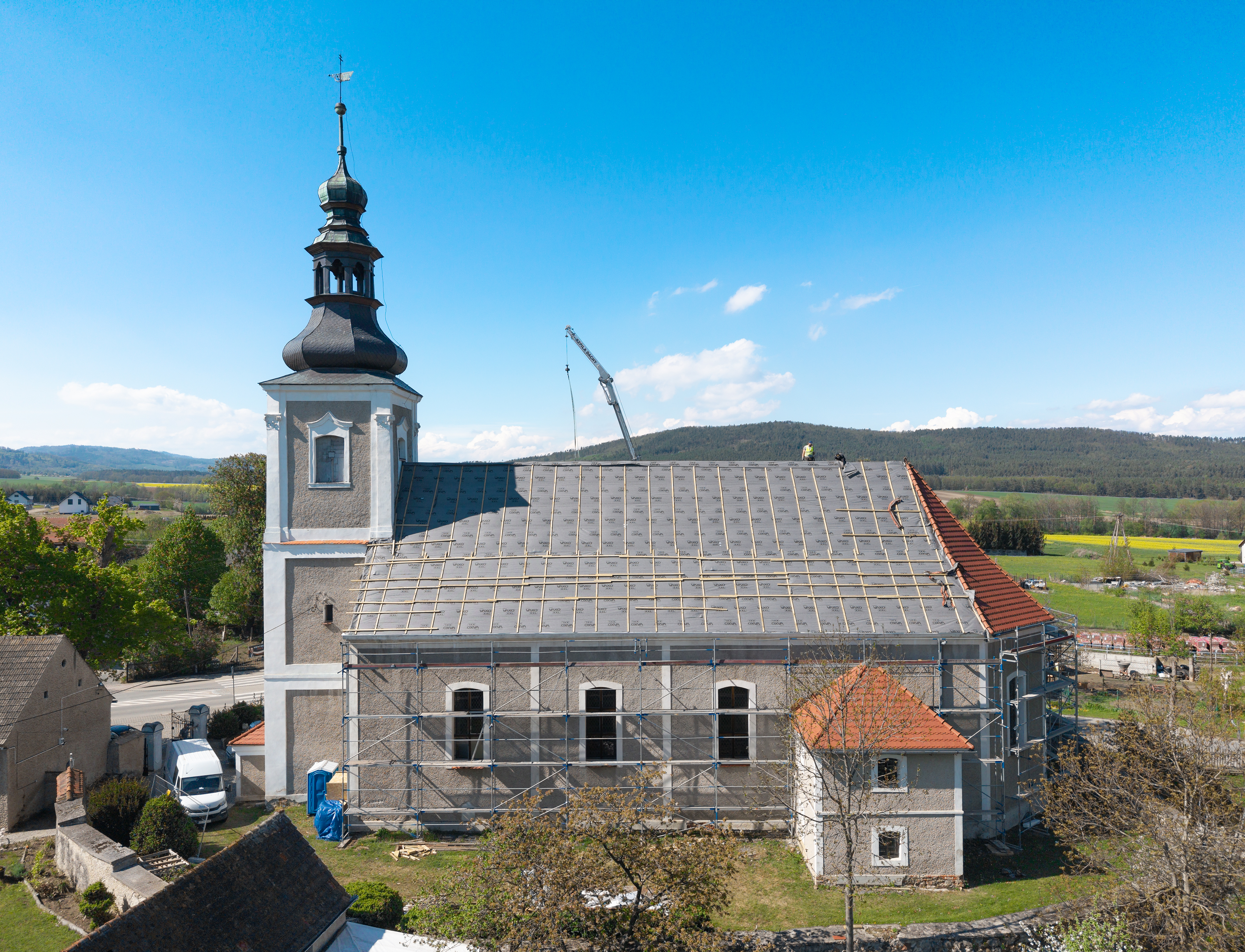

- Location within Poland
- Coordinates: 50°32′25″N 16°44′00″E
- Country: Poland
- Voivodeship: Lower Silesian
- County: Ząbkowice
- Gmina: Bardo

Brzeźnica [bʐɛʑˈɲit͡sa] is a village in the administrative district of Gmina Bardo, within Ząbkowice County, Lower Silesian Voivodeship, in south-western Poland.
