= Dębowina =

- Village
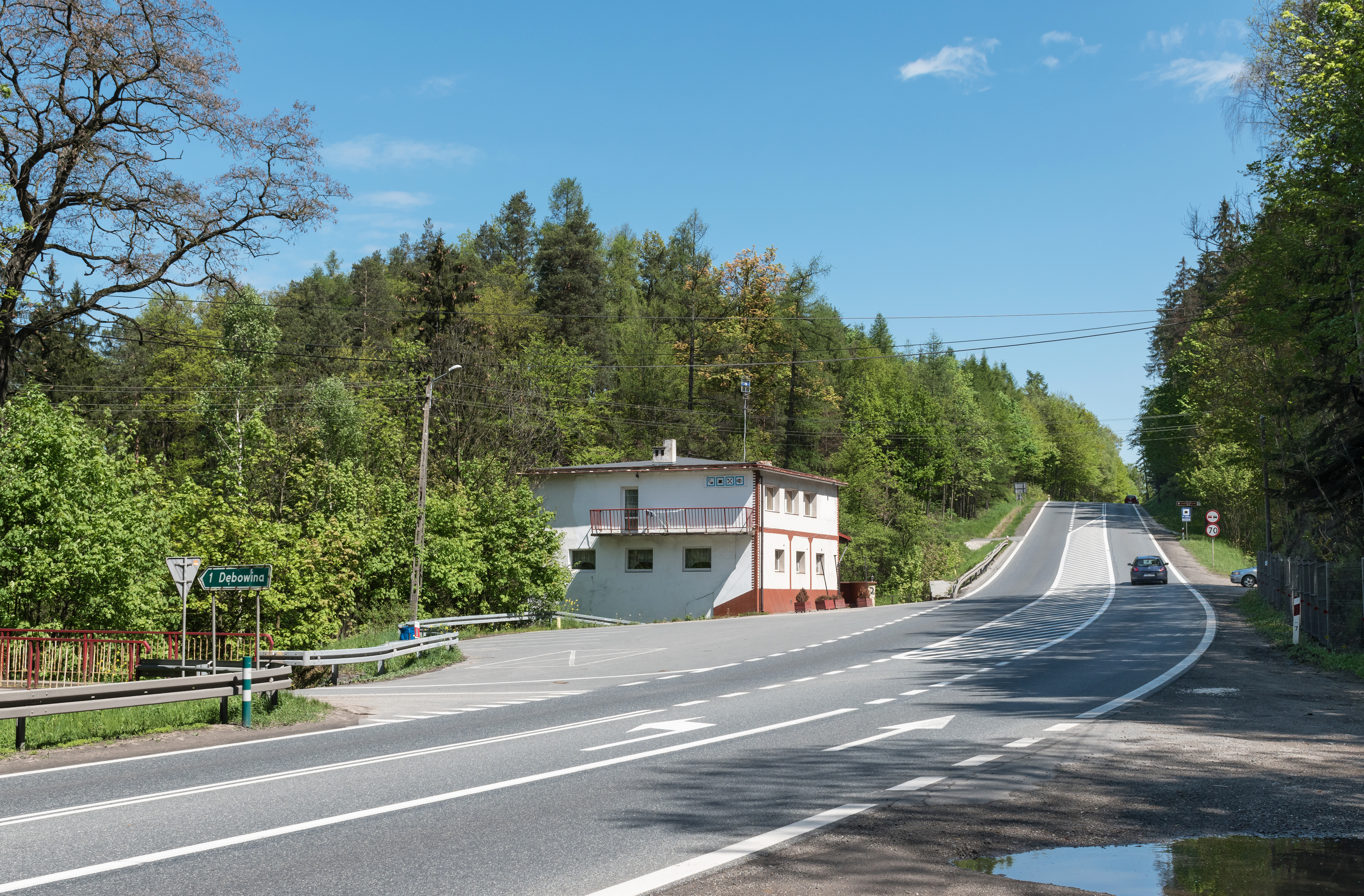

- Location within Poland
- Coordinates: 50°29′N 16°43′E
- Country: Poland
- Voivodeship: Lower Silesian
- County: Ząbkowice
- Gmina: Bardo
- Highest elevation: 400 m (1,300 ft)
- Lowest elevation: 375 m (1,230 ft)
- Population (approx.): 100

Dębowina [dɛmbɔˈvʲina] is a village in the administrative district of Gmina Bardo, within Ząbkowice County, Lower Silesian Voivodeship, in south-western Poland.
