= Przyłęk, Lower Silesian Voivodeship =

Przyłęk
- Village
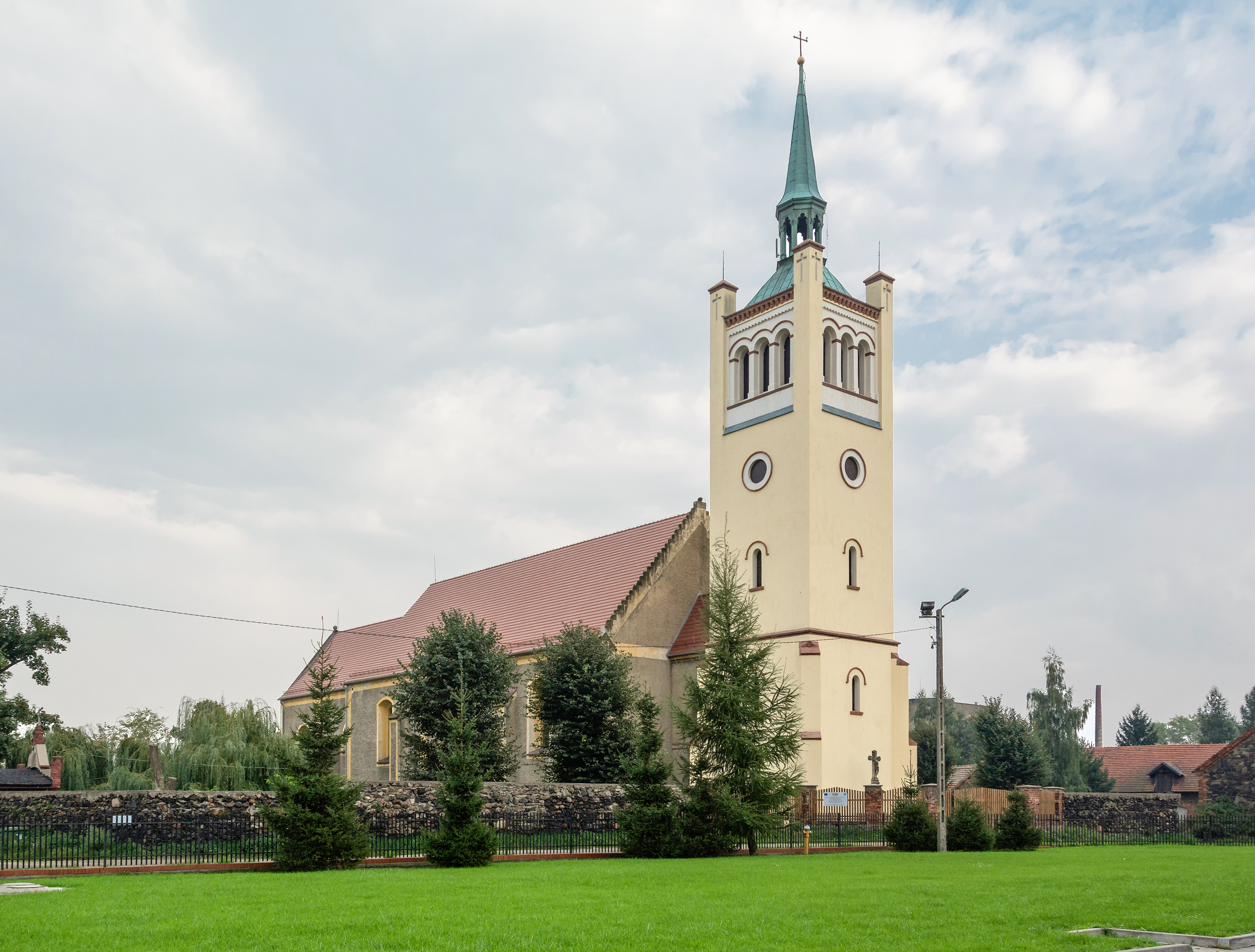
- Saint Anne church in Przyłęk

- Location within Poland
- Coordinates: 50°31′N 16°47′E
- Country: Poland
- Voivodeship: Lower Silesian
- County: Ząbkowice
- Gmina: Bardo
- Time zone: UTC+1 (CET)
  - Summer (DST): UTC+2 (CEST)
- Vehicle registration: DZA

Przyłęk [ˈpʂɨwɛŋk] is a village in the administrative district of Gmina Bardo, within Ząbkowice County, Lower Silesian Voivodeship, in south-western Poland.

== History ==
Town rights were granted before 1241 and revoked in 1284. Later on, it was a church possession, divided between the Collegiate Church of the Holy Cross and St. Bartholomew in Wrocław and the Cistercian abbey in Kamieniec Ząbkowicki. In 1842, it had a population of 954.
