= Dzierżkowice, Lower Silesian Voivodeship =

Dzierżkowice
- Village
- Location within Poland
- Coordinates: 51°09′22″N 16°24′46″E
- Country: Poland
- Voivodeship: Lower Silesian
- County: Legnica
- Gmina: Ruja

Dzierżkowice [d͡ʑɛrʂkɔˈvit͡sɛ] is a village in the administrative district of Gmina Ruja, within Legnica County, Lower Silesian Voivodeship, in south-western Poland.
