= Grochowa, Ząbkowice County =

Grochowa
- Village

- Location within Poland
- Coordinates: 50°33′08″N 16°45′18″E
- Country: Poland
- Voivodeship: Lower Silesian
- County: Ząbkowice
- Gmina: Bardo

Grochowa [ɡrɔˈxɔva] is a village in the administrative district of Gmina Bardo, within Ząbkowice County, Lower Silesian Voivodeship, in south-western Poland.
