= Strzałkowice =

- Village
- Location within Poland
- Coordinates: 51°9′19″N 16°26′41″E
- Country: Poland
- Voivodeship: Lower Silesian
- County: Legnica
- Gmina: Ruja

Population
  - Total: 130

Strzałkowice [stʂau̯kɔˈvit͡sɛ] is a village in the administrative district of Gmina Ruja, within Legnica County, Lower Silesian Voivodeship, in south-western Poland.
