= Ruhijärv =

Lake in Mulgi Rural Municipality, Estonia

- Location within Estonia
- Location: Mulgi Parish, Viljandi County, Estonia
- Coordinates: 58.014°N 25.512°E
- Basin countries: Estonia
- Max. length: 2,380 meters (7,810 ft)
- Surface area: 84.5 hectares (209 acres)
- Average depth: 2.5 meters (8 ft 2 in)
- Max. depth: 6.8 meters (22 ft)
- Water volume: 2,107,000 cubic meters (74,400,000 cu ft)
- Shore length^{1}: 6,550 meters (21,490 ft)
- Surface elevation: 77.1 meters (253 ft)
- ^{1} Shore length is not a well-defined measure.

Ruhijärv, also known as Ruhja järv, is a lake in Estonia. It is located in the village of Lilli in Mulgi Parish, Viljandi County. Ruhijärv is the source of the Rūja River (Estonian: Ruhja).

== Physical description ==
The lake has an area of 84.5 hectares (209 acres). The lake has an average depth of 2.5 meters (8 ft 2 in) and a maximum depth of 6.8 meters (22 ft). It is 2,380 meters (7,810 ft) long, and its shoreline measures 6,550 meters (21,490 ft). It has a volume of 2,107,000 cubic meters (74,400,000 cu ft).

== See also ==
- List of lakes of Estonia
