= Komorniki, Legnica County =

Komorniki
- Village
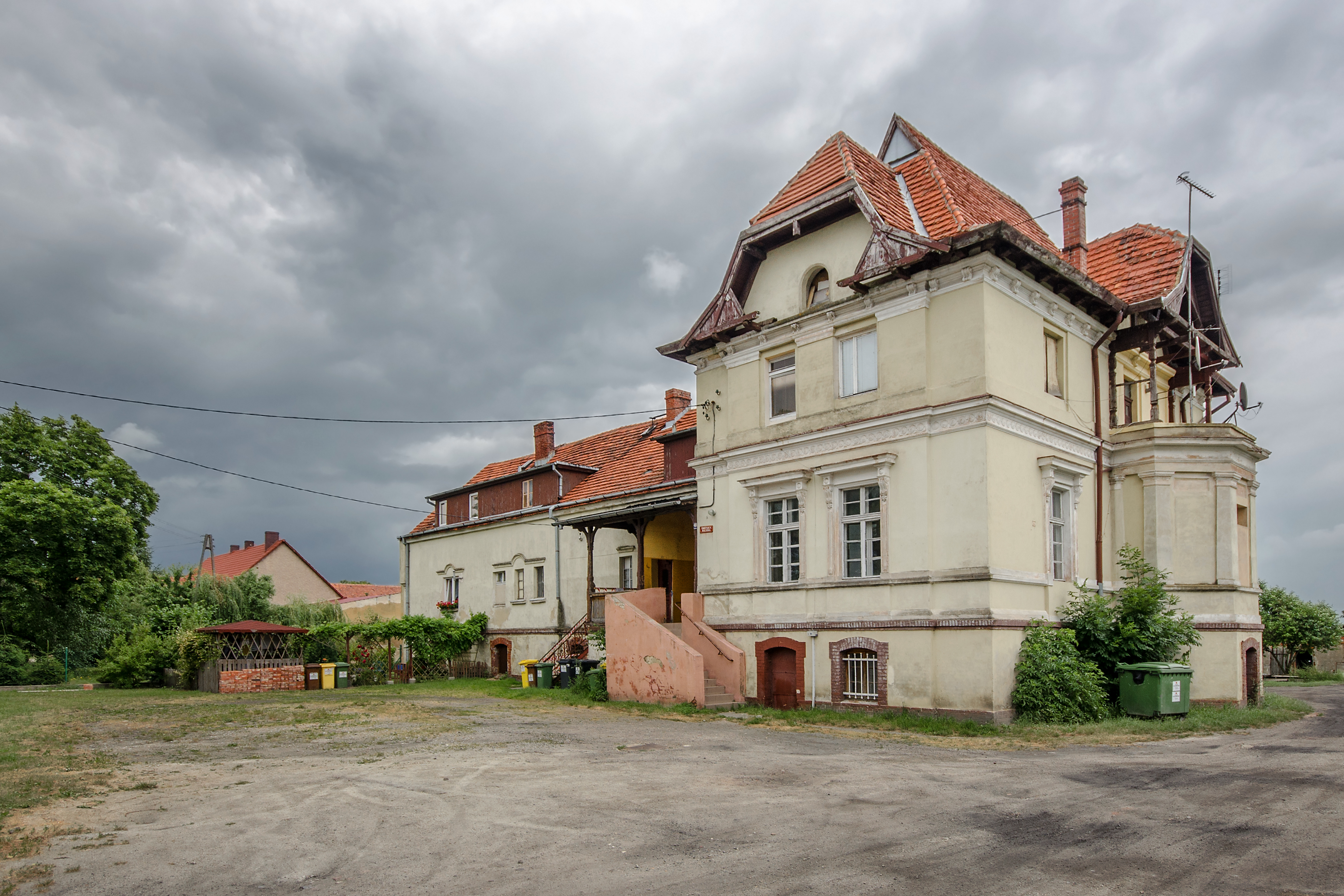
- Palace

- Location within Poland
- Coordinates: 51°10′55″N 16°22′17″E
- Country: Poland
- Voivodeship: Lower Silesian
- County: Legnica
- Gmina: Ruja

Komorniki [kɔmɔrˈniki] is a village in the administrative district of Gmina Ruja, within Legnica County, Lower Silesian Voivodeship, in south-western Poland.
