= Potworów, Lower Silesian Voivodeship =

Potworów
- Village
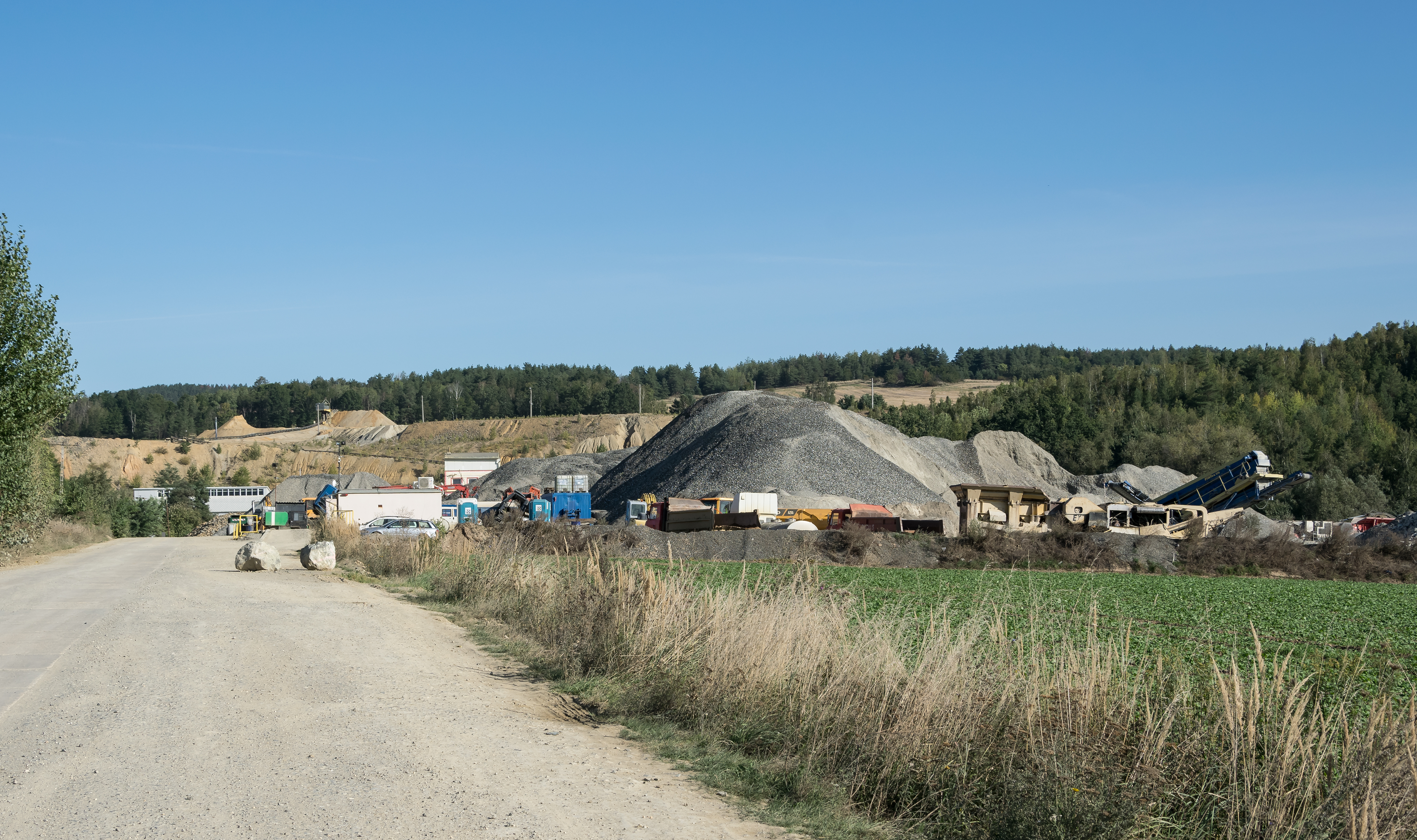
- Magnesite mine in Potworów

- Location within Poland
- Coordinates: 50°31′54″N 16°44′44″E
- Country: Poland
- Voivodeship: Lower Silesian
- County: Ząbkowice
- Gmina: Bardo

Population
  - Total: 310

Potworów [pɔtˈfɔruf] is a village in the administrative district of Gmina Bardo, within Ząbkowice County, Lower Silesian Voivodeship, in south-western Poland.
