= Gmina Bardo =

Gmina Bardo Bardo Commune
- Gmina
- Coat of arms
- Interactive map of Gmina Bardo
- Coordinates (Bardo): 50°31′N 16°44′E
- Country: Poland
- Voivodeship: Lower Silesian
- County: Ząbkowice
- Seat: Bardo
- Sołectwos: Brzeźnica, Dębowina, Dzbanów, Grochowa, Janowiec, Laskówka, Opolnica, Potworów, Przyłęk

Area
  - Total: 73.41 km^{2} (28.34 sq mi)

Population (2019-06-30)
  - Total: 5,316
  - Density: 72.42/km^{2} (187.6/sq mi)
  - Urban: 2,562
  - Rural: 2,754
- Website: http://www.bardo.pl/

Gmina Bardo is an urban-rural gmina (administrative district) in Ząbkowice County, Lower Silesian Voivodeship, in south-western Poland. Its seat is the town of Bardo, which lies approximately 10 kilometres (6 mi) south-west of Ząbkowice Śląskie, and 72 kilometres (45 mi) south of the regional capital Wrocław.

The gmina covers an area of 73.41 square kilometres (28.3 sq mi), and as of 2019 its total population is 5,316.

== Neighbouring gminas ==
Gmina Bardo is bordered by the gminas of Kamieniec Ząbkowicki, Kłodzko, Stoszowice, Ząbkowice Śląskie and Złoty Stok.

== Villages ==
Apart from the town of Bardo, the gmina contains the villages of Brzeźnica, Dębowina, Dzbanów, Grochowa, Janowiec, Laskówka, Opolnica, Potworów and Przyłęk.

== Twin towns and sister cities ==
Gmina Bardo is twinned with:

- Česká Skalice, Czech Republic
- Tarnowo Podgórne, Poland
- Týn nad Vltavou, Czech Republic
