= Gmina Ruja =

Gmina Ruja Ruja Commune
- Gmina
- Flag Coat of arms
- Interactive map of Gmina Ruja
- Coordinates (Ruja): 51°10′N 16°24′E
- Country: Poland
- Voivodeship: Lower Silesian
- County: Legnica
- Seat: Ruja
- Sołectwos: Dzierżkowice, Janowice, Komorniki, Lasowice, Polanka, Rogoźnik, Ruja, Strzałkowice, Tyniec Legnicki, Usza, Wągrodno

Area
  - Total: 73.37 km^{2} (28.33 sq mi)

Population (2019-06-30)
  - Total: 2,639
  - Density: 35.97/km^{2} (93.16/sq mi)
- Website: http://www.ruja.pl/

Gmina Ruja is a rural gmina (administrative district) in Legnica County, Lower Silesian Voivodeship, in south-western Poland. Its seat is the village of Ruja, which lies approximately 18 kilometres (11 mi) east of Legnica, and 45 kilometres (28 mi) west of the regional capital Wrocław.

The gmina covers an area of 73.37 square kilometres (28.3 sq mi), and as of 2019 its total population was 2,639.

== Neighbouring gminas ==
Gmina Ruja is bordered by the gminas of Kunice, Legnickie Pole, Malczyce, Prochowice and Wądroże Wielkie.

== Villages ==
The gmina contains the villages of Dzierżkowice, Janowice, Komorniki, Lasowice, Polanka, Rogoźnik, Ruja, Strzałkowice, Tyniec Legnicki, Usza and Wągrodno.

== Twin towns – sister cities ==
Gmina Ruja is twinned with:

- Liebschützberg, Germany
