= Usza =

- Village
- Location within Poland
- Coordinates: 51°08′00″N 16°25′43″E
- Country: Poland
- Voivodeship: Lower Silesian
- County: Legnica
- Gmina: Ruja

Usza [ˈuʂa] is a village in the administrative district of Gmina Ruja, within Legnica County, Lower Silesian Voivodeship, in south-western Poland.
