= Dzbanów =

- Village
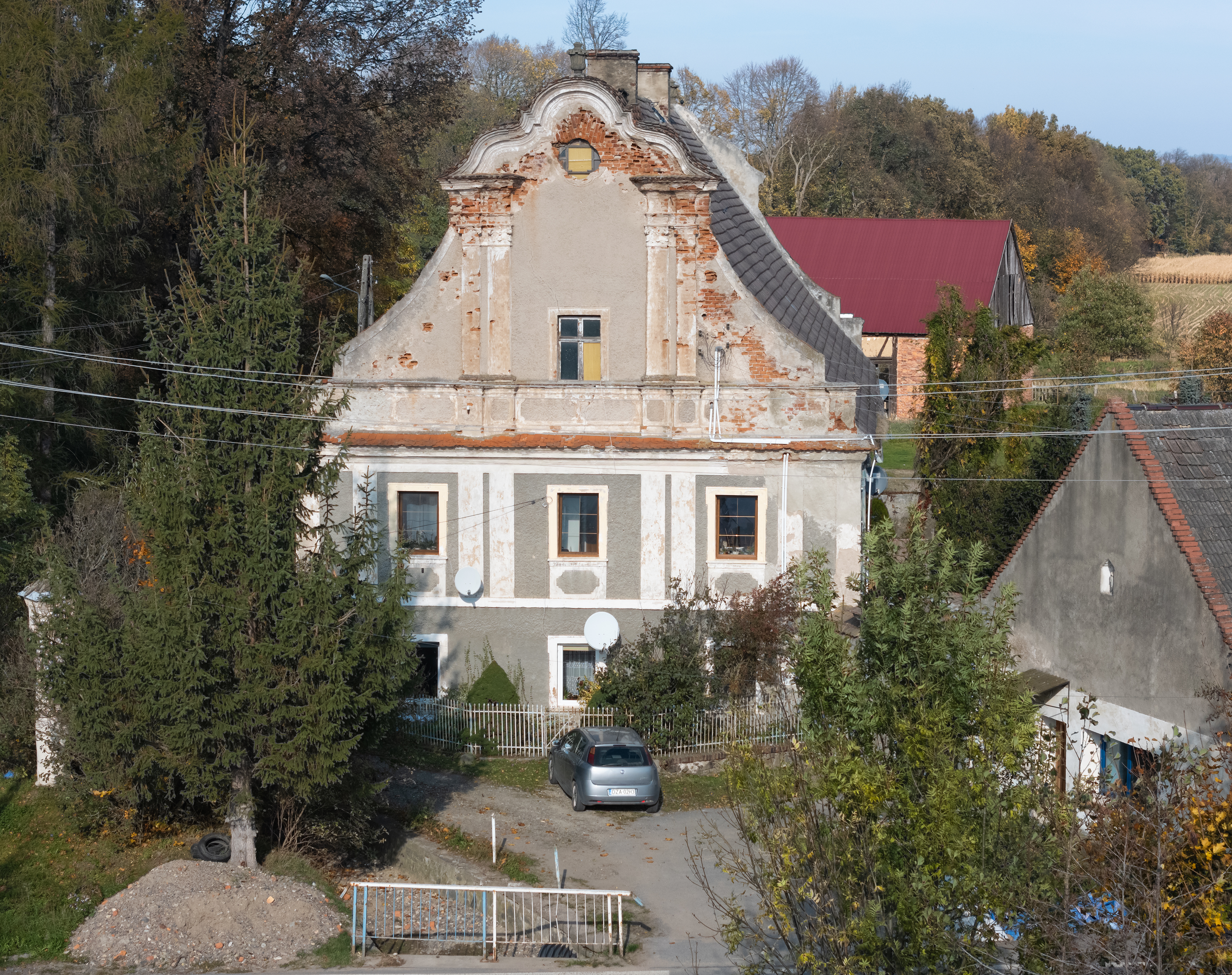
- Baroque manor

- Location within Poland
- Coordinates: 50°30′08″N 16°48′02″E
- Country: Poland
- Voivodeship: Lower Silesian
- County: Ząbkowice
- Gmina: Bardo

Dzbanów [ˈd͡zbanuf] is a village in the administrative district of Gmina Bardo, within Ząbkowice County, Lower Silesian Voivodeship, in south-western Poland.
