= Opolnica =

- Village
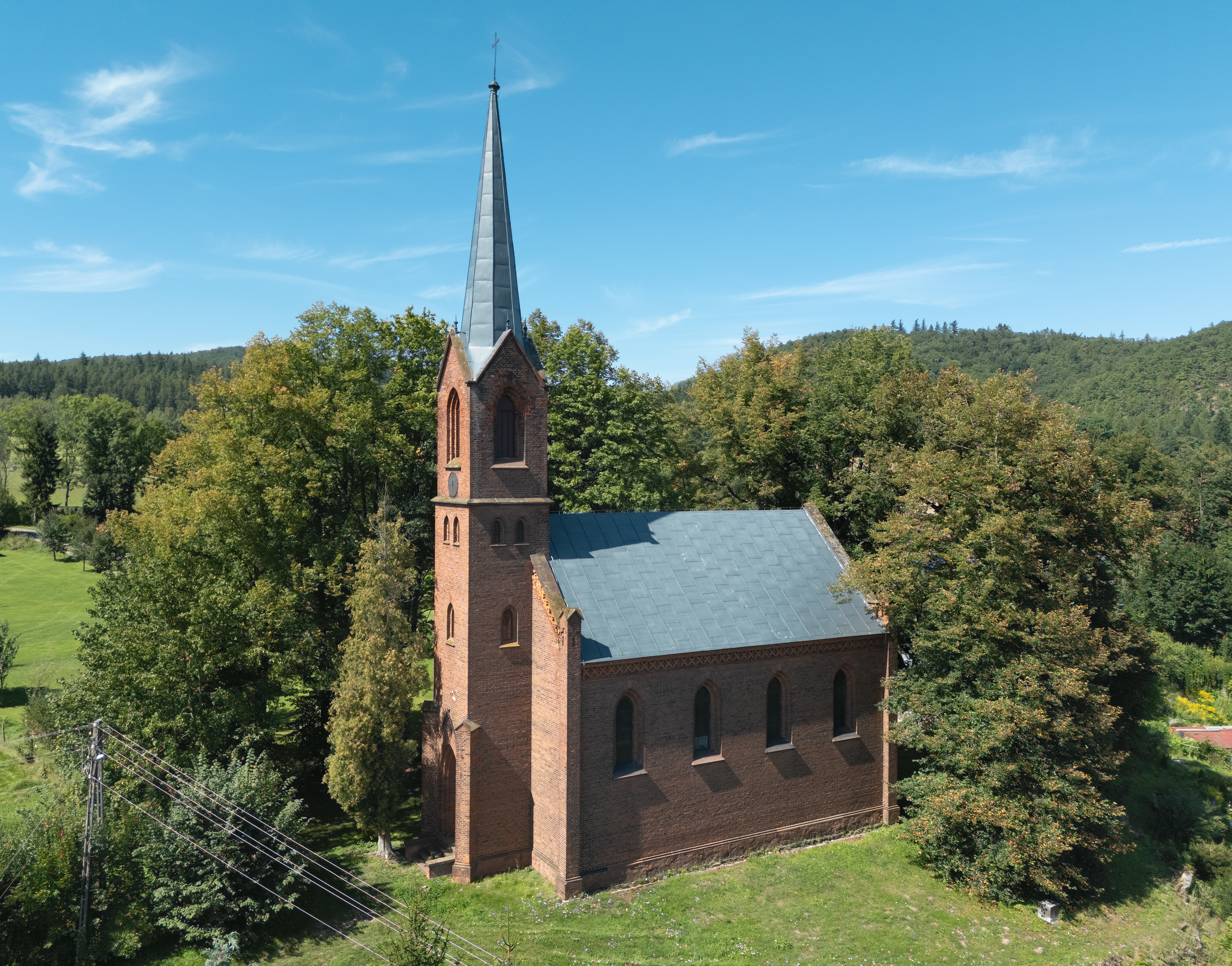

- Location within Poland
- Coordinates: 50°30′46″N 16°42′54″E
- Country: Poland
- Voivodeship: Lower Silesian
- County: Ząbkowice
- Gmina: Bardo

Opolnica [ɔpɔlˈɲit͡sa] is a village in the administrative district of Gmina Bardo, within Ząbkowice County, Lower Silesian Voivodeship, in south-western Poland.
