= Bardo, Poland =

Bardo
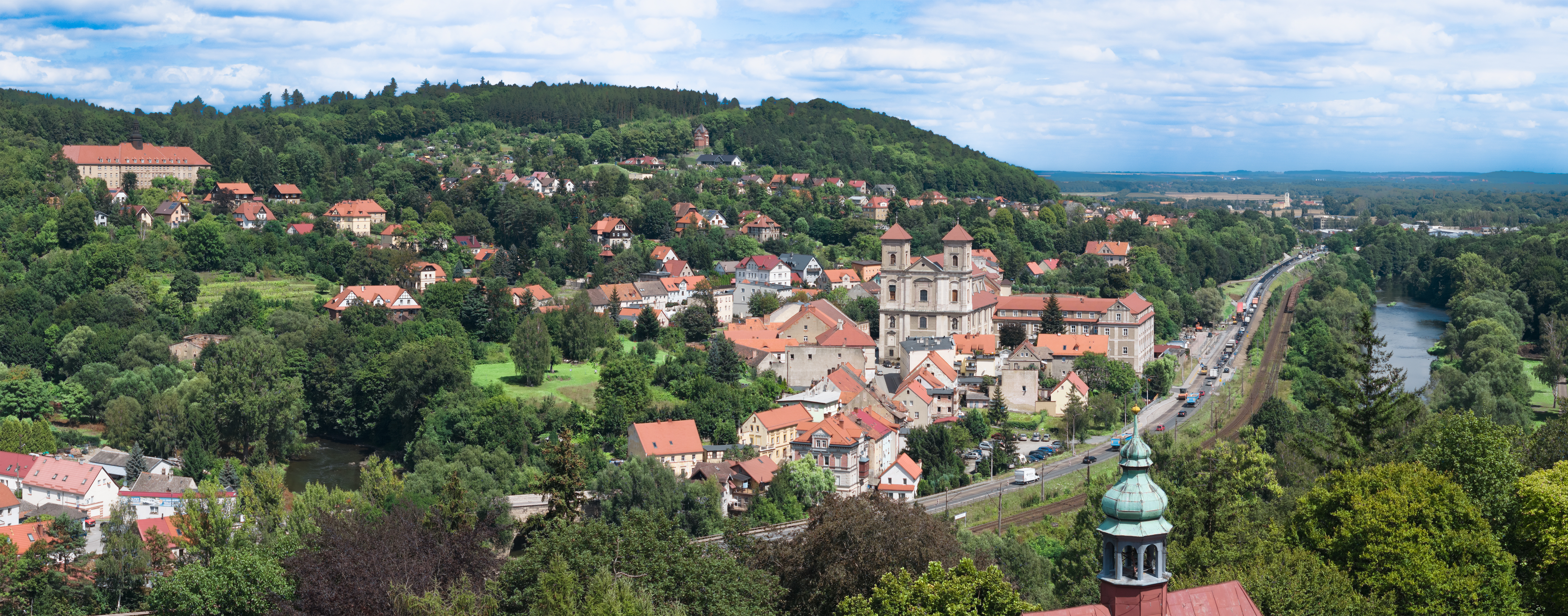
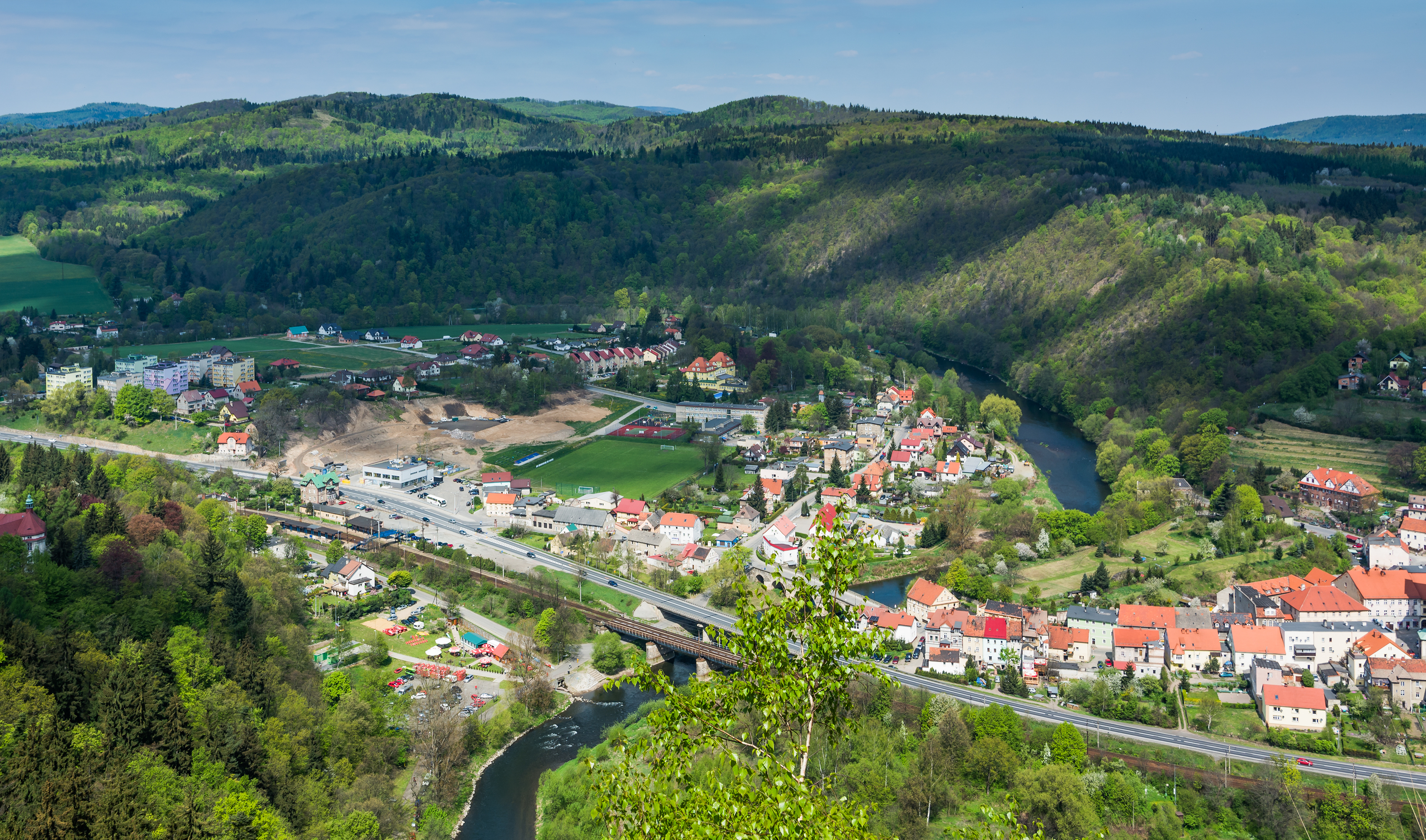
- Aerial view of the town and surrounding hills

- Coat of arms

- Location within Poland
- Coordinates: 50°31′N 16°44′E
- Country: Poland
- Voivodeship: Lower Silesian
- County: Ząbkowice
- Gmina: Bardo
- Founded: 10th century
- Town rights: early 14th century

Government
  - Mayor: Krzysztof Żegański

Area
  - Total: 4.71 km^{2} (1.82 sq mi)

Population (31 December 2021)
  - Total: 2,440
  - Density: 518/km^{2} (1,340/sq mi)
- Time zone: UTC+1 (CET)
  - Summer (DST): UTC+2 (CEST)
- Postal code: 57-256
- Area code: +48 74
- Car plates: DZA
- Website: http://www.bardo.pl

Bardo [ˈbardɔ] is a historical town in Ząbkowice County, Lower Silesian Voivodeship, in south-western Poland. It is the seat of the administrative district (gmina) called Gmina Bardo.

As of December 2021, the town has a population of 2,440.

The town is a widely known place of pilgrimage and adoration of the Virgin Mary.

== Geography ==
Bardo lies on the Eastern Neisse river, flowing out of the Kłodzko Valley towards the Silesian Lowlands.

== History ==
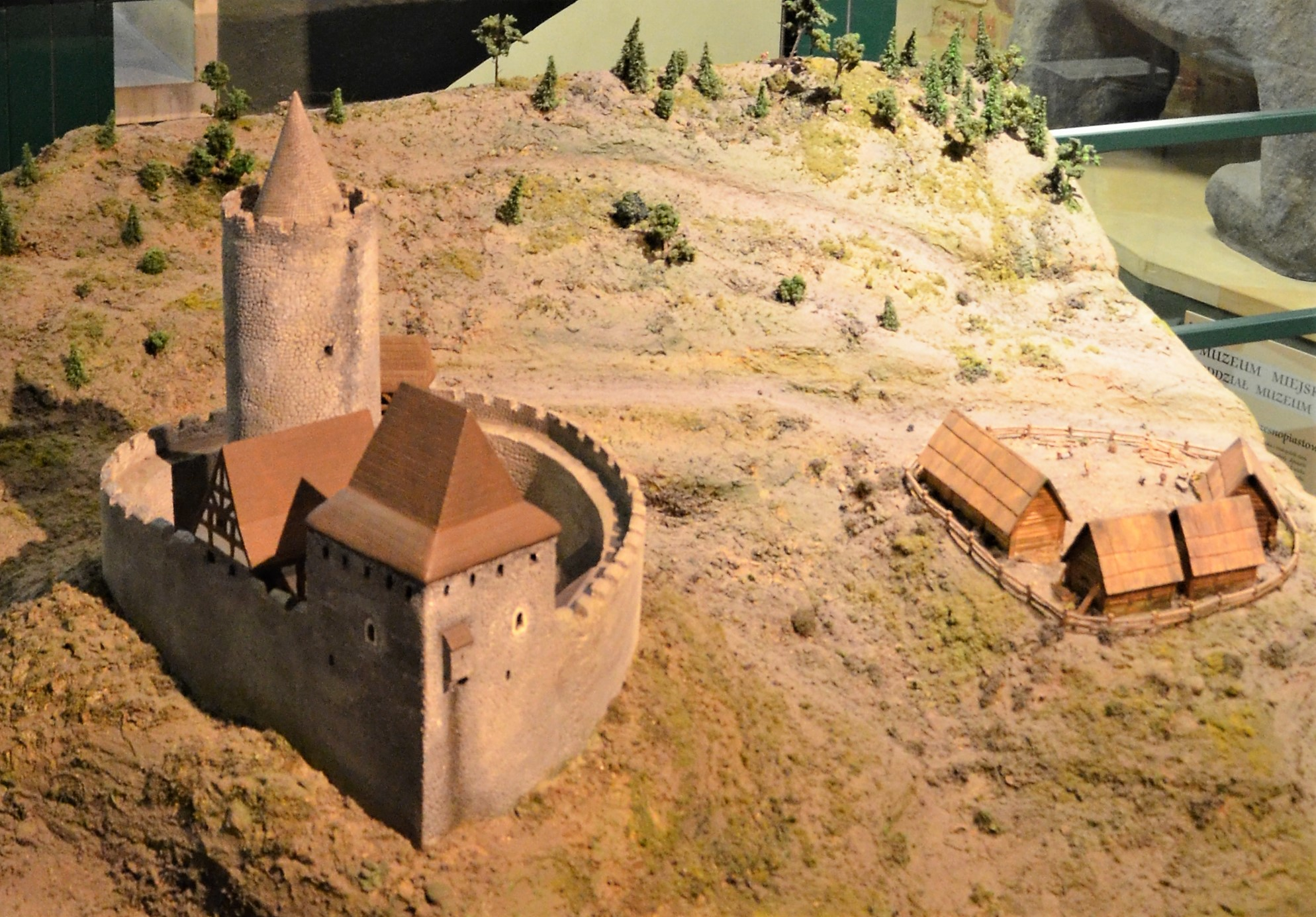
Scale model of the medieval Piast Castle

Bardo was founded in the 10th century as a Polish defensive gord on a medieval trade route from Prague across the Sudetes via Kłodzko to Wrocław and Gniezno. The surrounding area was populated by Lechitic tribes and became part of the emerging Polish state in the 10th century under first historic ruler Mieszko I of Poland. Bardo's castellans were Polish knights. They secured the southern border of the Lower Silesian lands with adjacent Kłodzko Land in Bohemia.

In 1096 Duke Bretislaus II of Bohemia captured and devastated the fortress, nevertheless in 1137 it returned to Poland. The following year, due to the fragmentation of Poland, Bardo became part of the Polish Duchy of Silesia. From 1278 it belonged to the Duchy of Jawor under the Piast duke Bolko I the Strict, from 1321 to the Duchy of Ziębice under Duke Bolko II. With Ziębice, Bardo was vassalized by the Kingdom of Bohemia in 1336, however, it remained under rule of local Polish dukes of the Piast dynasty until 1428. Its chapel was built in the 10th century, and it was first mentioned in 1189 as being granted to the Knights Hospitaller by the Bishops of Wrocław. In 1210 it passed to the Canons Regular at Kamieniec Abbey. By 1290 the gord had lost its strategic importance and ceased to exist as a castellany. In 1299 the whole area was purchased by the Cistercian order and was owned by them until 1810. The image of the Madonna dates back to the 13th century, probably the oldest in Silesia. The Baroque pilgrimage church was erected between 1686 and 1704. The sanctuary was visited twice by the future Pope John Paul II, in 1957 and 1978. In 1981 a monument of Pope John Paul II was unveiled in Bardo, as the second in Poland after Kraków.

After the First Silesian War, Bardo along with most of Silesia was annexed by Prussia in 1742. In 1826, Fryderyk Chopin travelled through the town. From 1871 to 1945 it was part of Germany. During World War II, the Germans established and operated a forced labour subcamp of the Stalag VIII-A prisoner-of-war camp in the town. After the defeat of Nazi Germany in the war it became again part of Poland under border changes promulgated at the Potsdam Conference. Also in accordance with the agreement, the German population was expelled and Bardo was repopulated by Poles, most of whom were themselves expelled from former eastern Poland annexed by the Soviet Union. In 1949–1950 Greeks and Macedonians, refugees of the Greek Civil War, were temporarily admitted in Bardo, before new homes were found for them in other towns. Following the Korean War, in 1956–1959, Poland admitted 400 North Korean orphans in Bardo.

Bardo had gained the status of a town in the early 14th century, but this was lost as the result of the destruction caused by World War II. It became the seat of a gmina in 1954, and was granted town status again in 1969.

== Sights ==
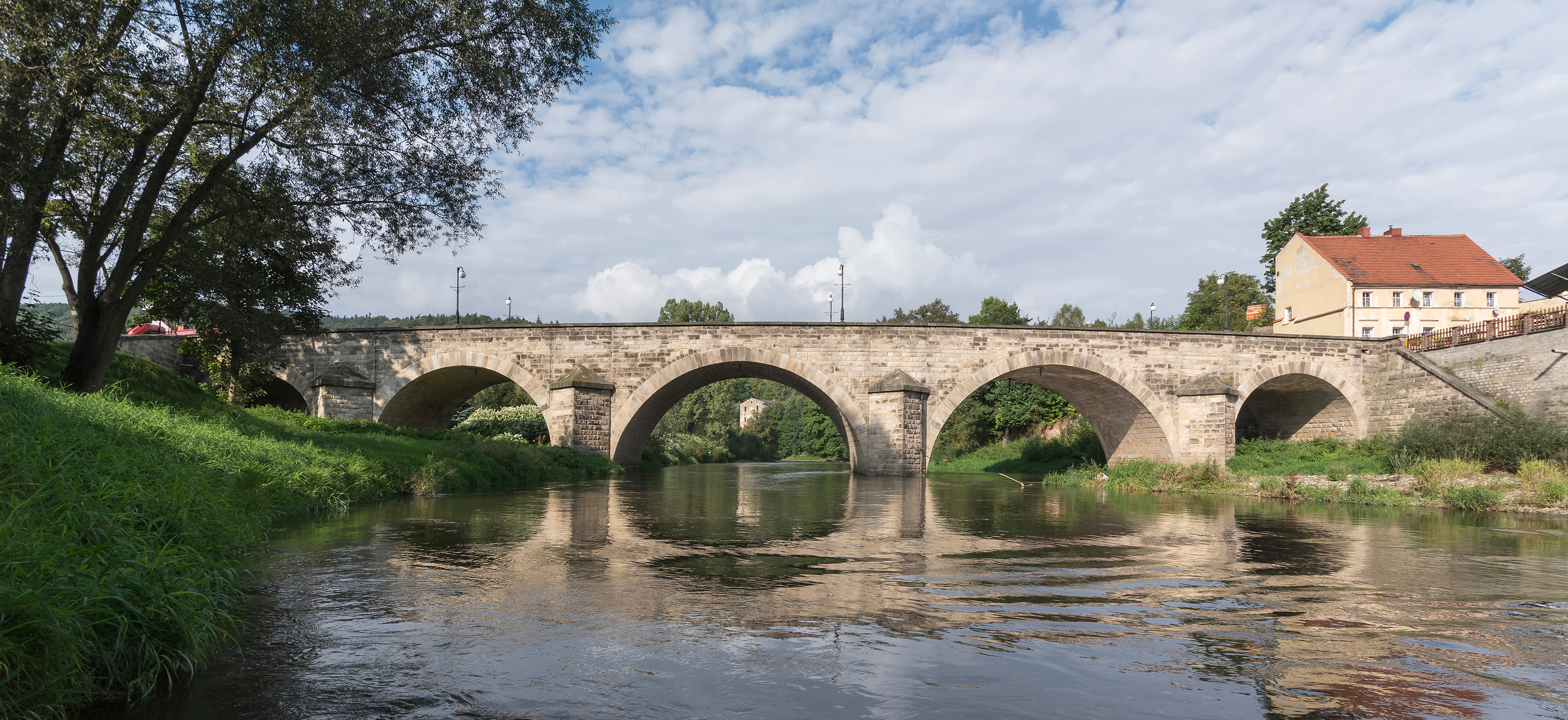
Gothic bridge over the Eastern Neisse river (Nysa Kłodzka)

Historic buildings still existing in Bardo include:

- a 15th-century stone bridge across the Nysa Kłodzka River
- Basilica of the Visitation, a Baroque pilgrimage church with an altarpiece by Michael Willmann
- Redemptorist monastery
- numerous historic townhouses in the Old Town (Stare Miasto)
- Ursuline Convent
- Monastery of the Congregation of the Sisters of Mary Immaculate
- Różańcowa Góra (Mount Rosary) chapels
- ruins of the medieval Piast Castle

== Gallery ==
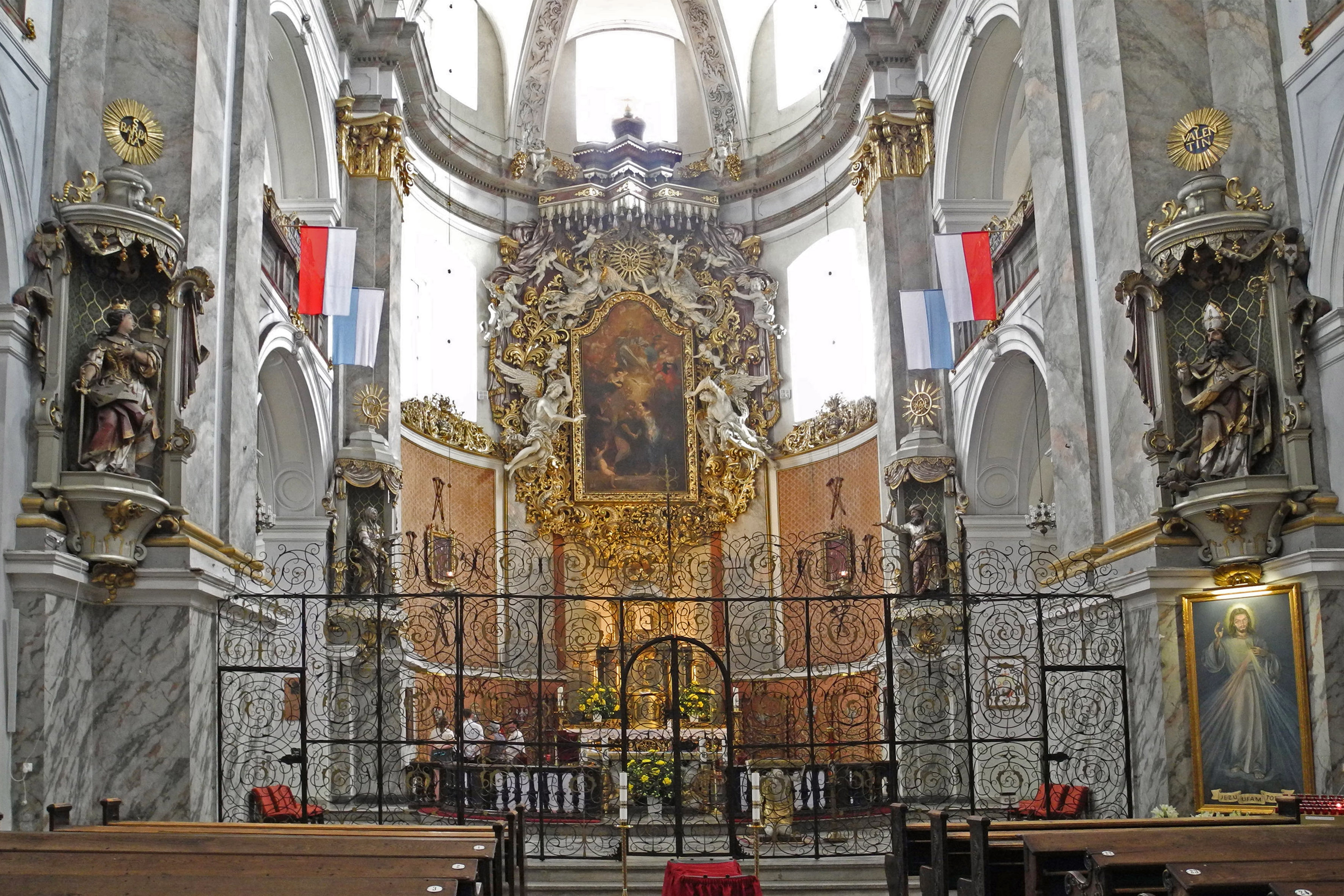
Interior of the Basilica of the Visitation

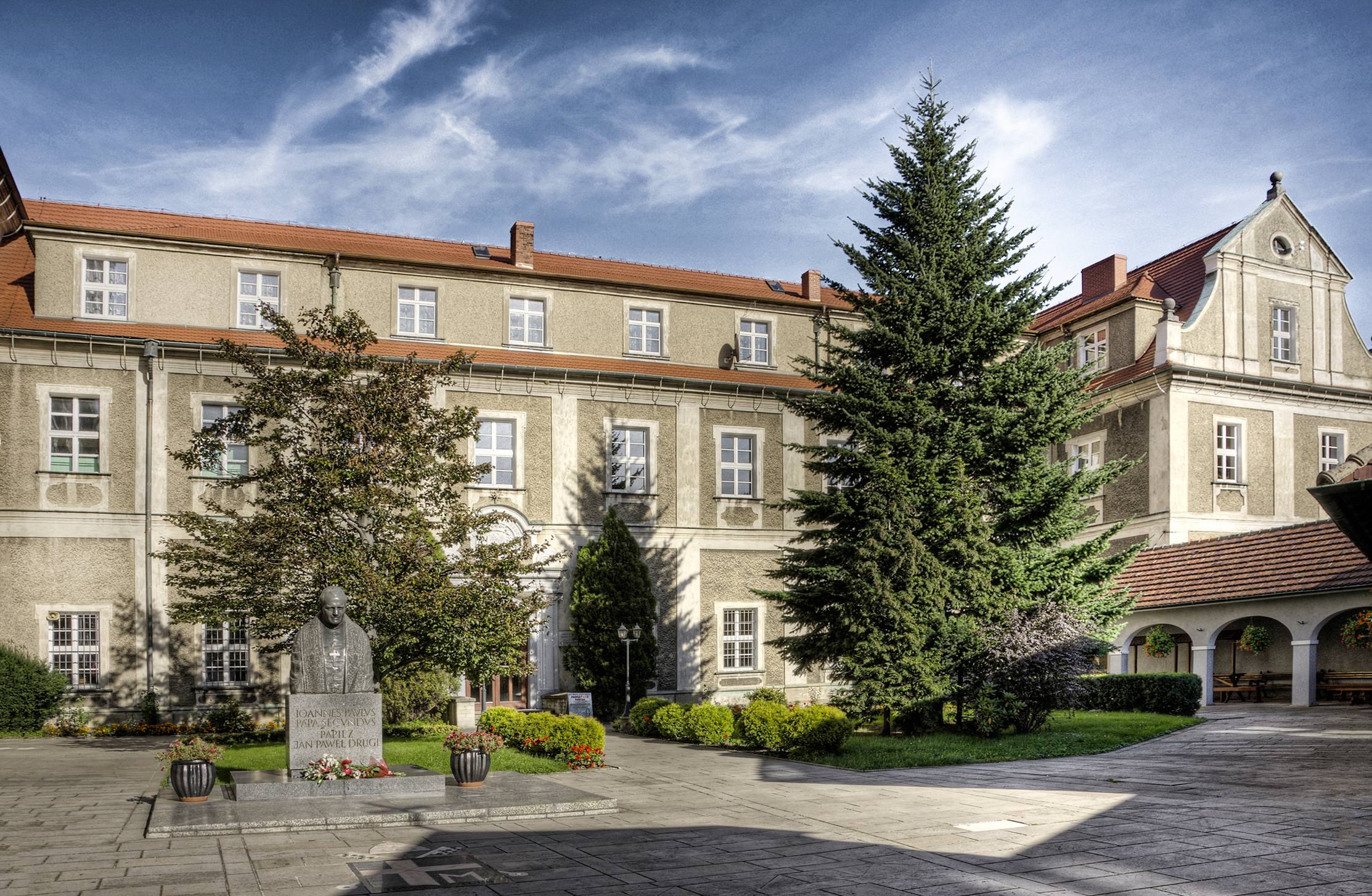
Redemptorist monastery

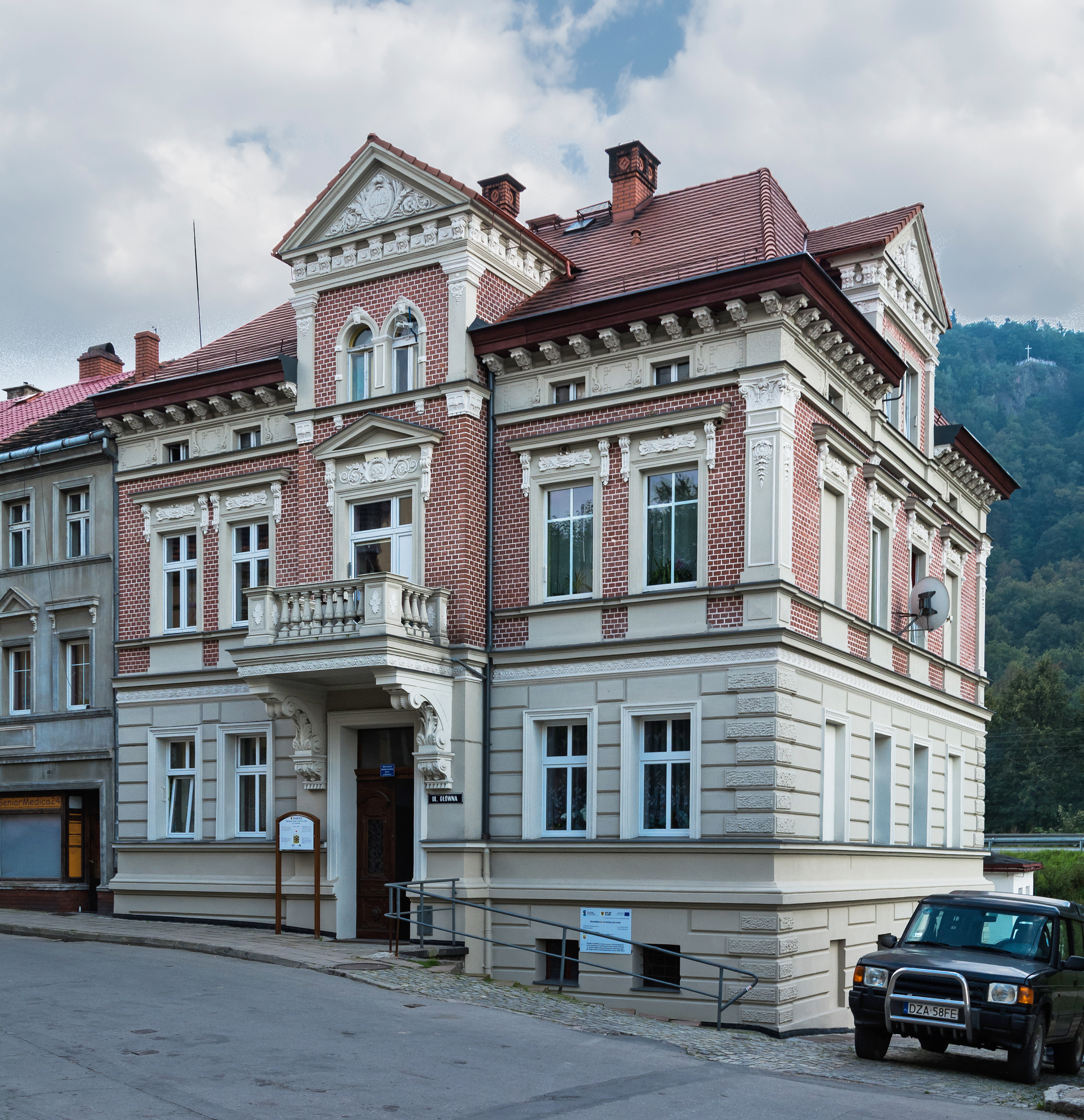
Former bank building in the Old Town

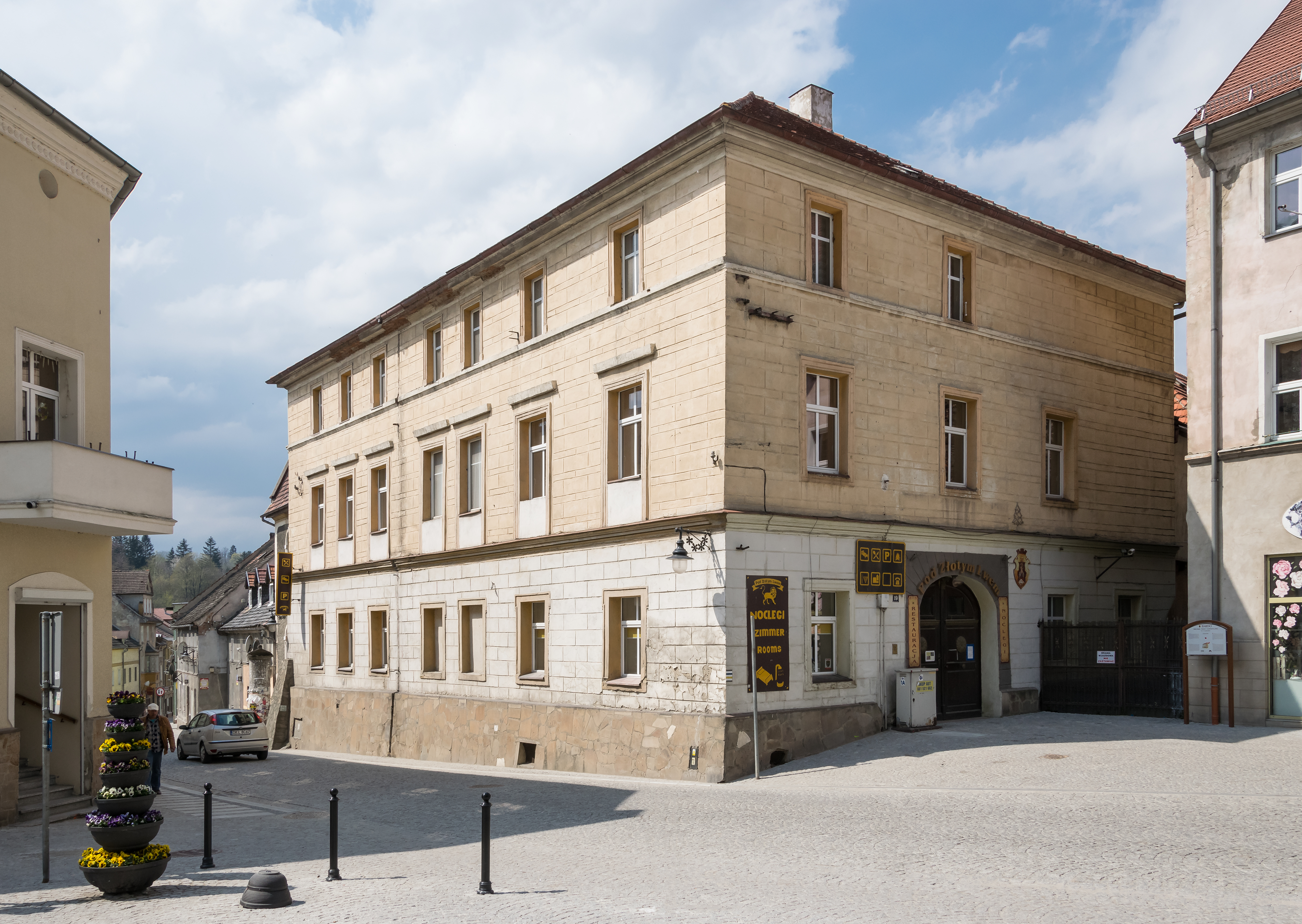
Pod Złotym Lwem ("Under the Golden Lion") Inn

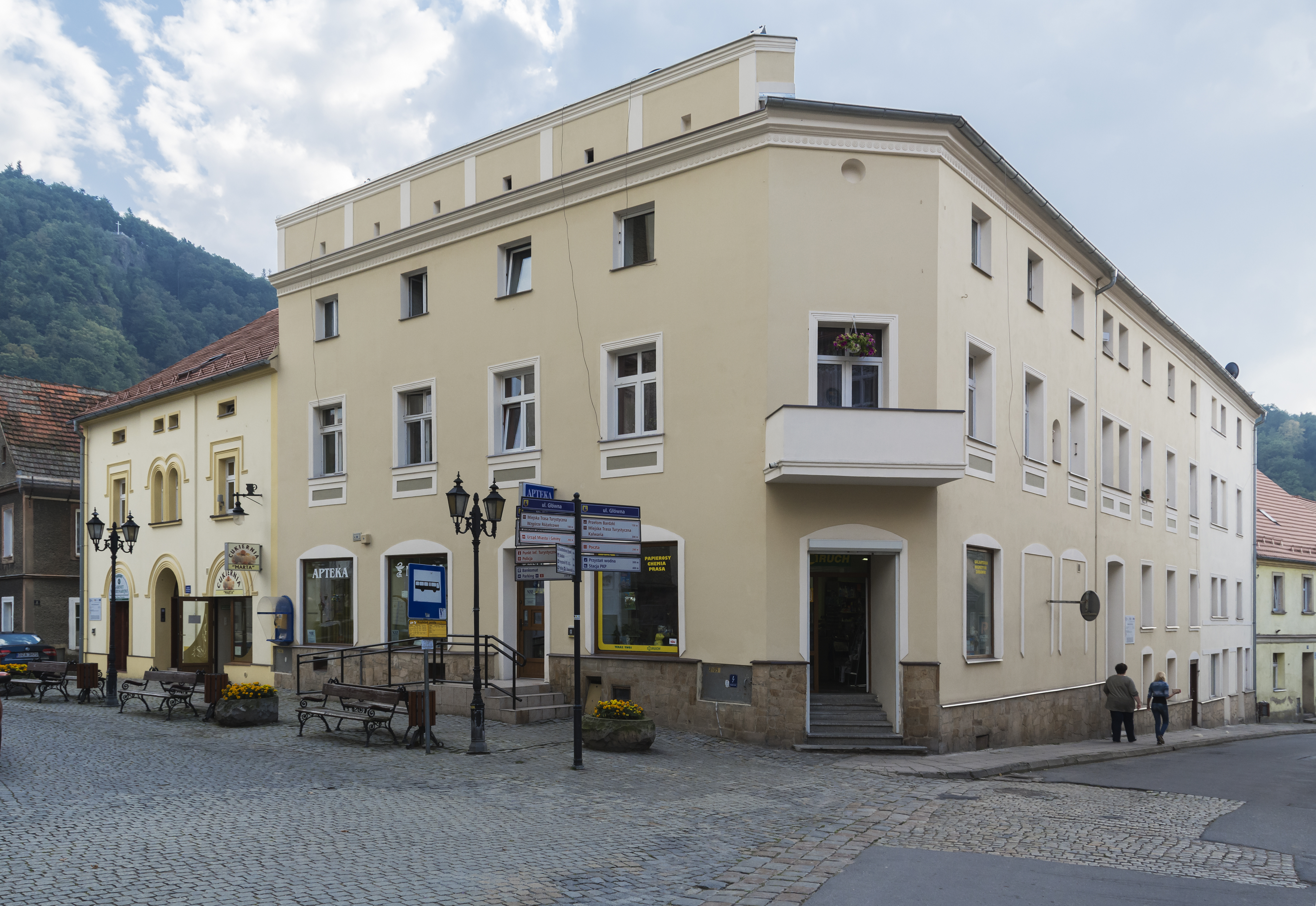
Historic townhouses in the Old Town

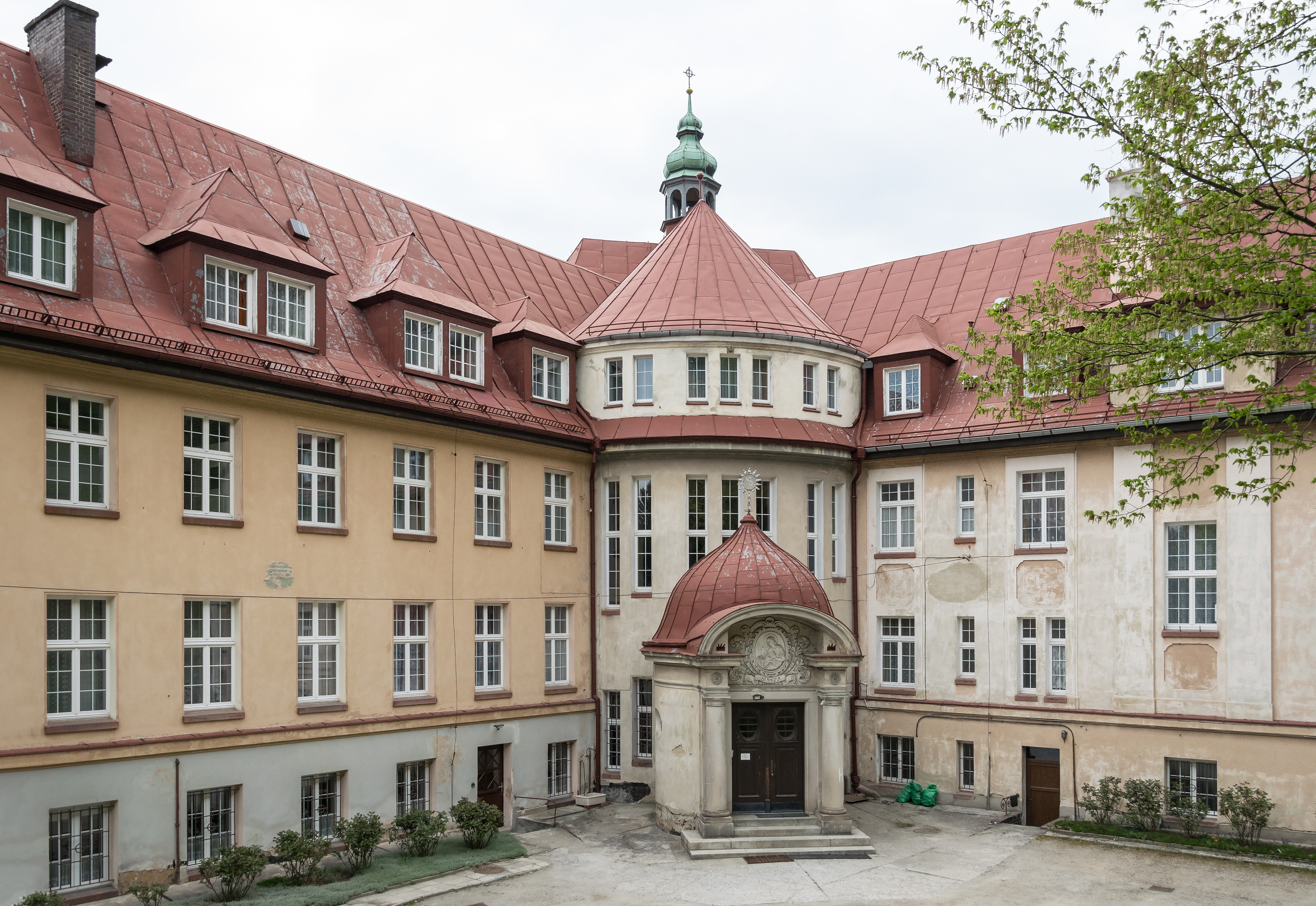
Ursuline Convent

== Twin towns and sister cities ==
See twin towns of Gmina Bardo.

== See also ==
- Tourism in Poland
