= Tyniec Legnicki =

- Village
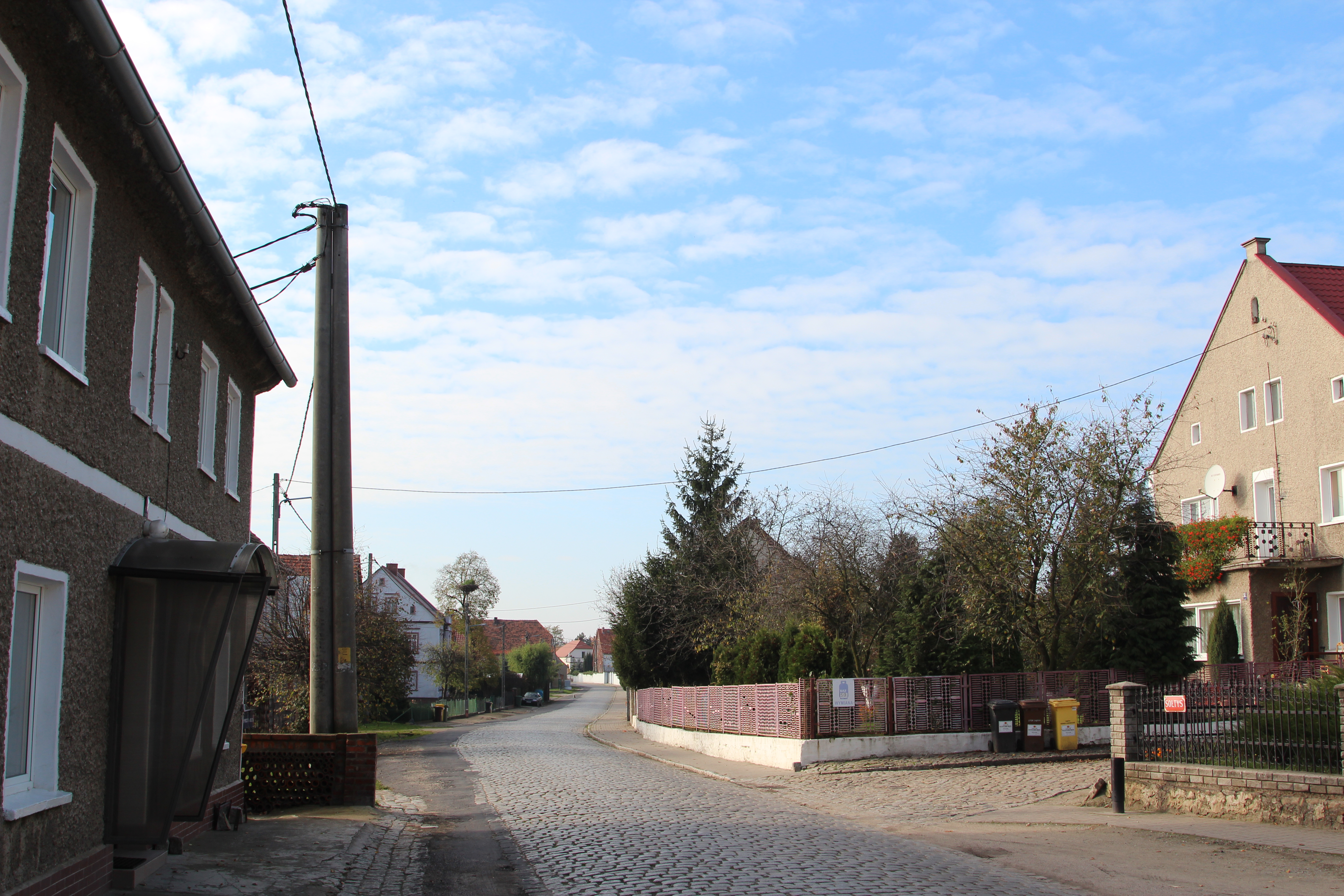

- Location within Poland
- Coordinates: 51°10′N 16°23′E
- Country: Poland
- Voivodeship: Lower Silesian
- County: Legnica
- Gmina: Ruja

Tyniec Legnicki [ˈtɨɲɛt͡s lɛɡˈnit͡ski] is a village in the administrative district of Gmina Ruja, within Legnica County, Lower Silesian Voivodeship, in south-western Poland.
