= Polanka, Lower Silesian Voivodeship =

Village in Lower Silesian Voivodeship, Poland

Polanka
- Village
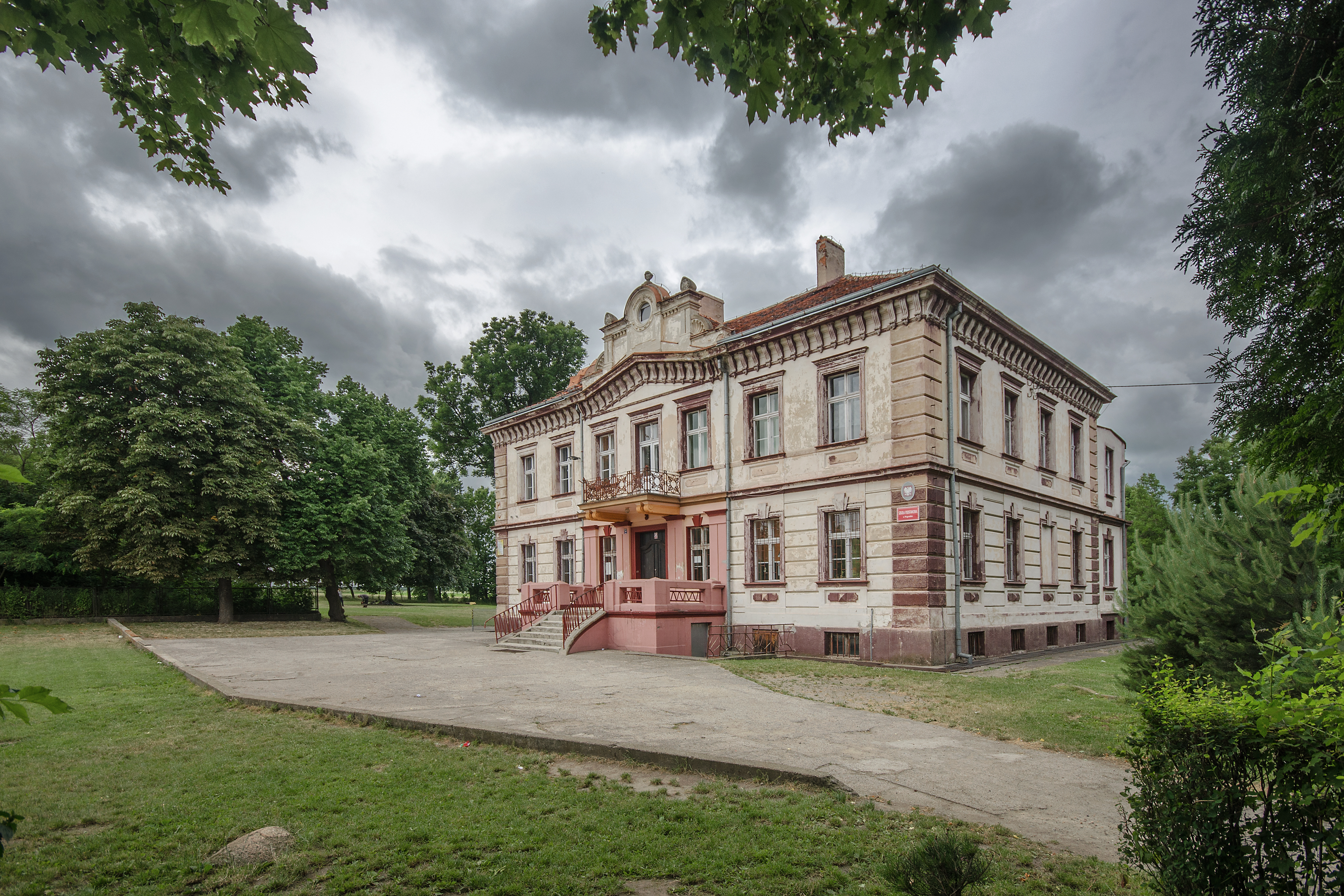
- Palace

- Location within Poland
- Coordinates: 51°09′15″N 16°20′56″E
- Country: Poland
- Voivodeship: Lower Silesian
- County: Legnica
- Gmina: Ruja

Polanka [pɔˈlaŋka] is a village in the administrative district of Gmina Ruja, within Legnica County, Lower Silesian Voivodeship, in south-western Poland.
