= Janowiec, Lower Silesian Voivodeship =

Janowiec
- Village
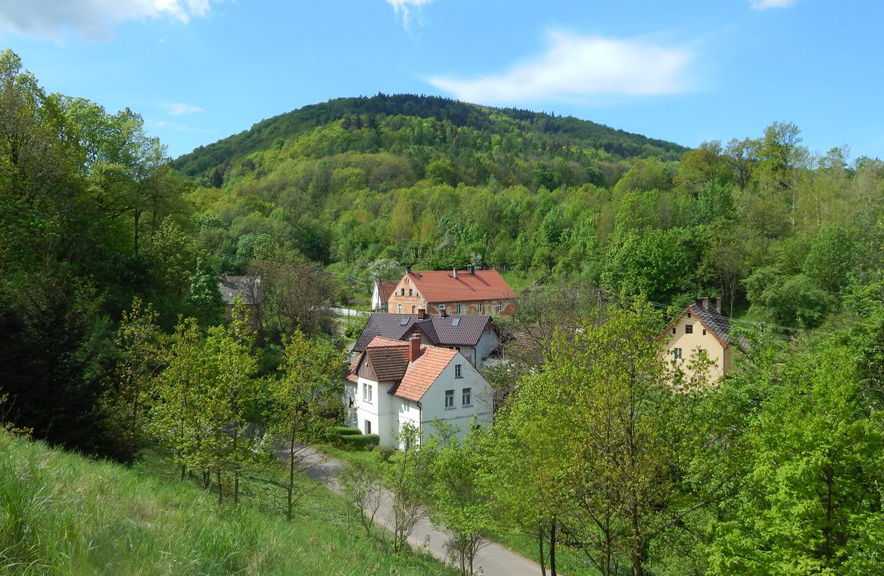
- View of Janowiec

- Location within Poland
- Coordinates: 50°30′14″N 16°46′06″E
- Country: Poland
- Voivodeship: Lower Silesian
- County: Ząbkowice
- Gmina: Bardo
- Time zone: UTC+1 (CET)
  - Summer (DST): UTC+2 (CEST)
- Vehicle registration: DZA

Janowiec [jaˈnɔvʲɛt͡s] is a village in the administrative district of Gmina Bardo, within Ząbkowice County, Lower Silesian Voivodeship, in south-western Poland.
