= Ruja, Lower Silesian Voivodeship =

Ruja
- Village
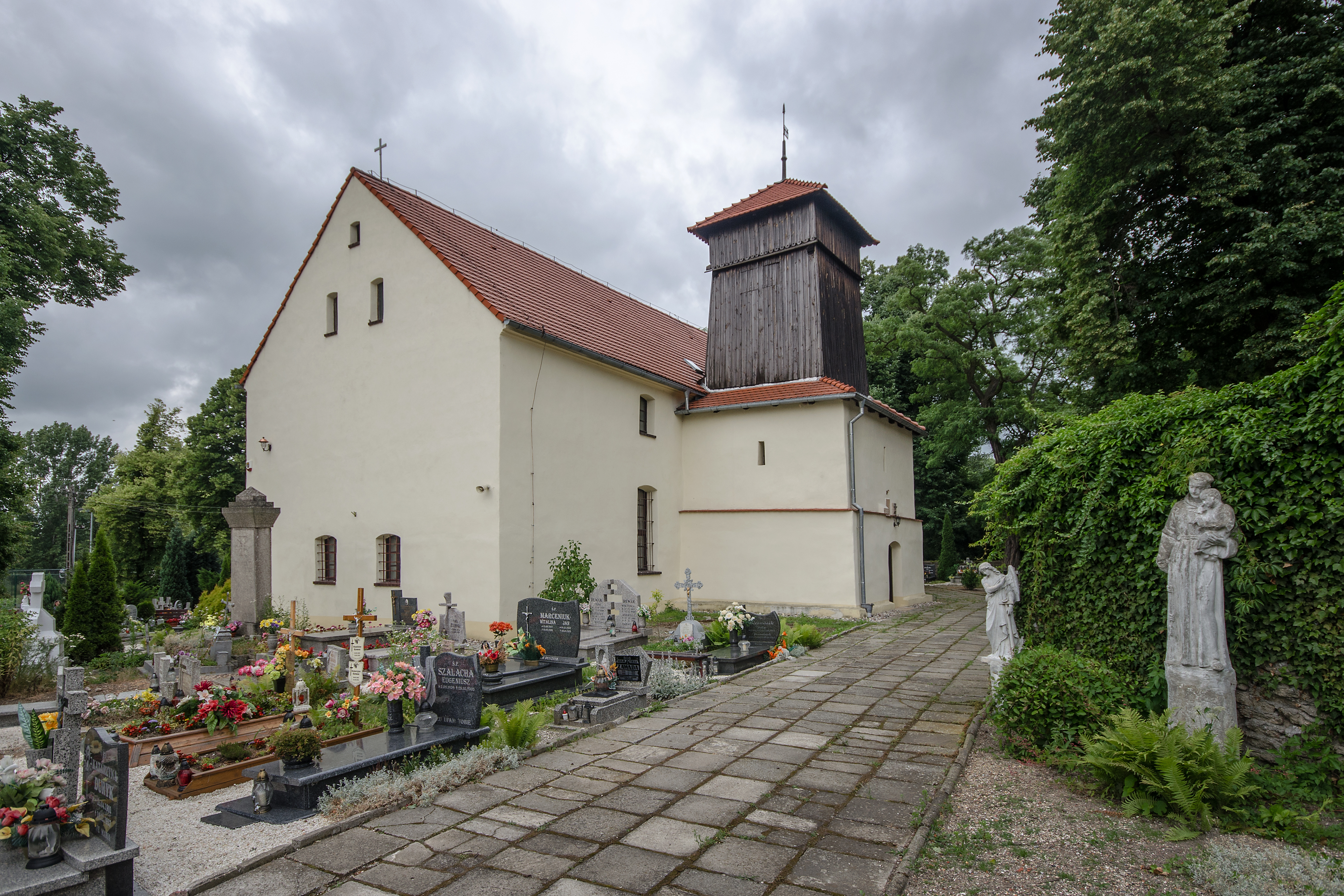
- Catholic church

- Location within Poland
- Coordinates: 51°10′N 16°24′E
- Country: Poland
- Voivodeship: Lower Silesian
- County: Legnica
- Gmina: Ruja

Ruja [ˈruja] (German: Royn) is a village in Legnica County, Lower Silesian Voivodeship, in south-western Poland. It is the seat of the administrative district (gmina) called Gmina Ruja.
