= Janowice, Lower Silesian Voivodeship =

Janowice
- Village
- Location within Poland
- Coordinates: 51°08′04″N 16°24′38″E
- Country: Poland
- Voivodeship: Lower Silesian
- County: Legnica
- Gmina: Ruja

Janowice [janɔˈvit͡sɛ] is a village in the administrative district of Gmina Ruja, within Legnica County, Lower Silesian Voivodeship, in south-western Poland.
