= Laskówka, Lower Silesian Voivodeship =

Laskówka
- Village
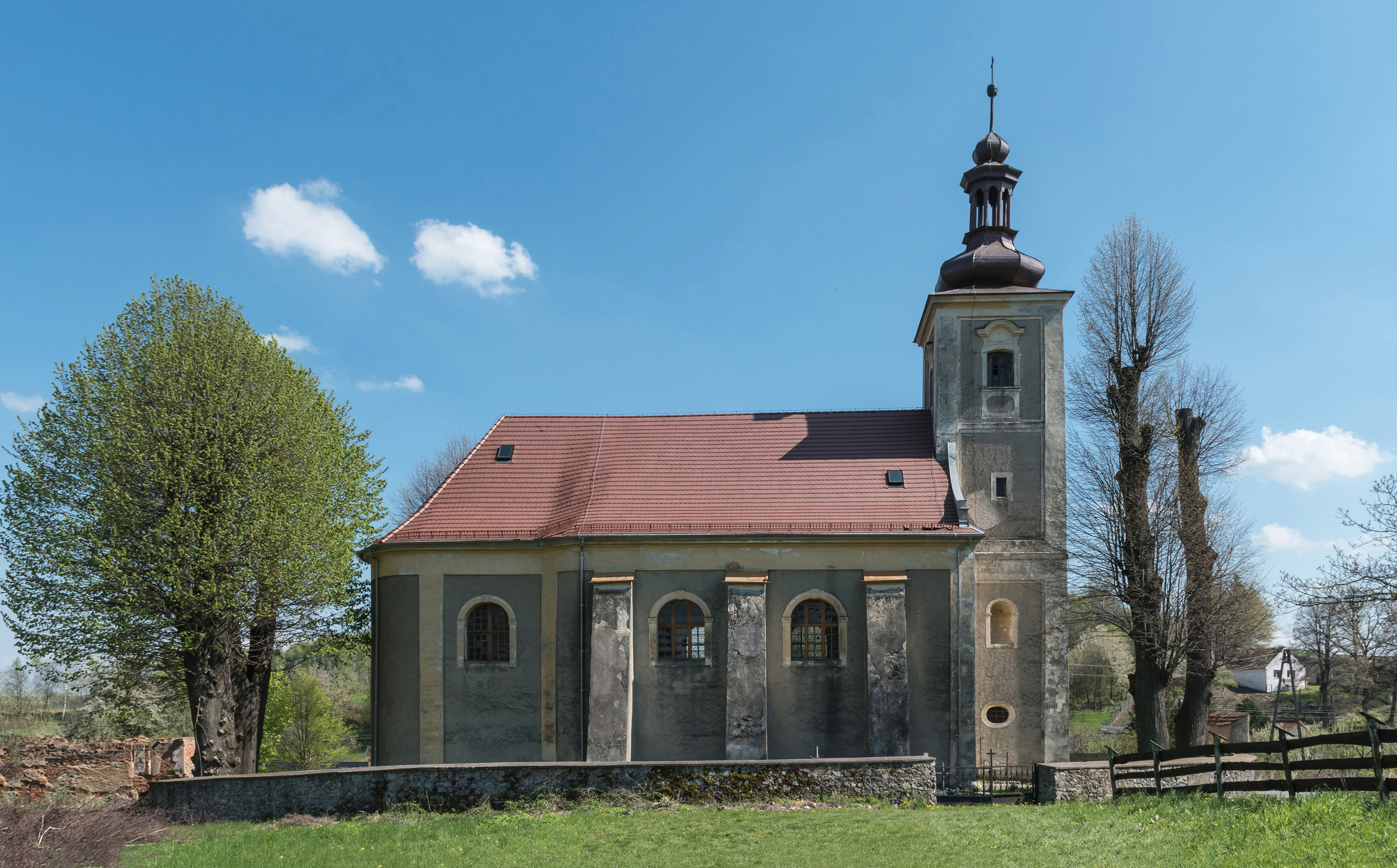

- Location within Poland
- Coordinates: 50°29′N 16°47′E
- Country: Poland
- Voivodeship: Lower Silesian
- County: Ząbkowice
- Gmina: Bardo
- Website: https://web.archive.org/web/20071115015555/http://www.laskowka.republika.pl/

Laskówka [lasˈkufka] is a village in the administrative district of Gmina Bardo, within Ząbkowice County, Lower Silesian Voivodeship, in south-western Poland.
