= Rogoźnik, Lower Silesian Voivodeship =

Rogoźnik
- Village
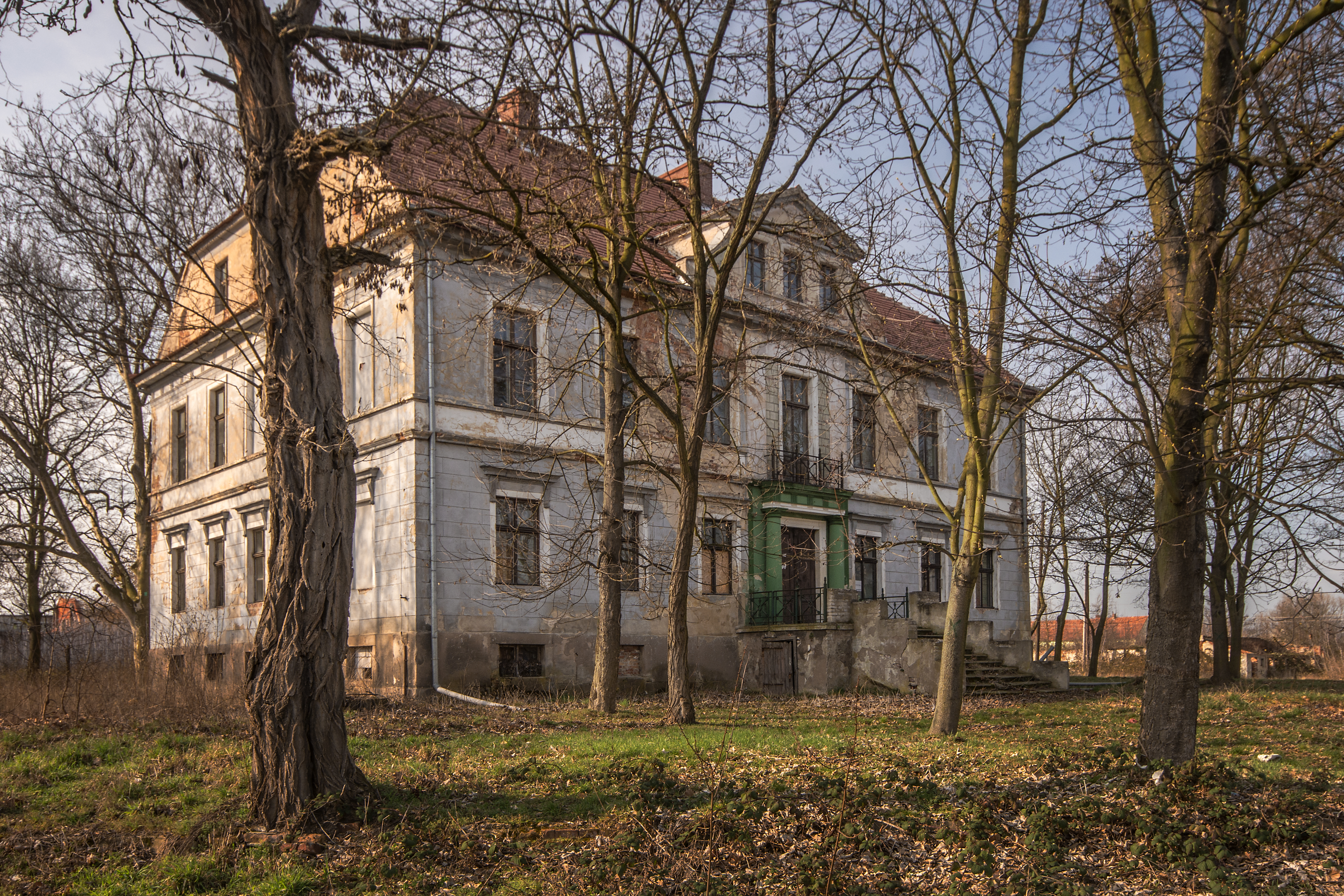
- Palace in Rogoźnik

- Location within Poland
- Coordinates: 51°10′18″N 16°19′57″E
- Country: Poland
- Voivodeship: Lower Silesian
- County: Legnica
- Gmina: Ruja

Rogoźnik [rɔˈɡɔʑnik] is a village in the administrative district of Gmina Ruja, within Legnica County, Lower Silesian Voivodeship, in south-western Poland.
