= Sokrat Janowicz =

Polish writer and journalist (1936–2013)

- Belarusian: Сакрат Яновіч
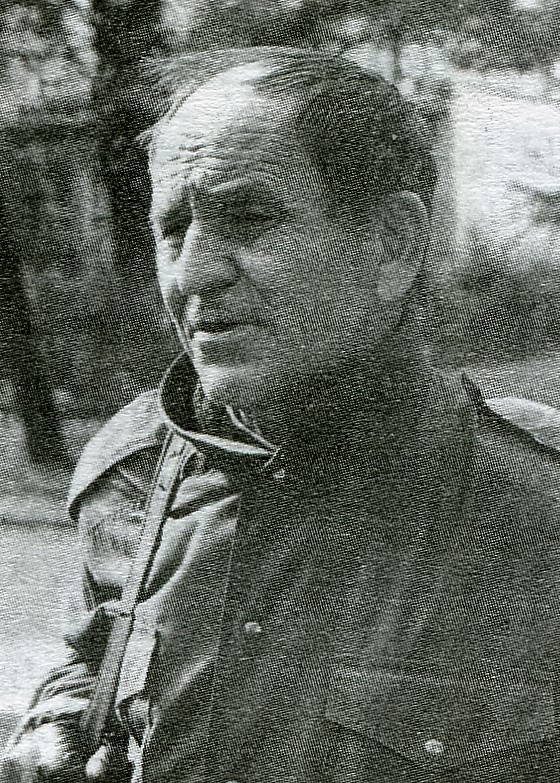
- Born: Sokrat Konstantinovich Janowicz; 4 September 1936; Krynki, Second Polish Republic
- Died: 17 February 2013 (aged 76); Krynki, Poland
- Education: University of Warsaw
- Occupations: Writer; essayist; journalist; publicist; translator
- Writing career
- Pen name: Adol Kastryca; Kolka Spluch; Alaksandr Antaszewicz; Kastuś Jankouski
- Language: Belarusian; Polish
- Notable awards: Andrzej Drawicz Award, 2003; Gloria Artis Medal for Merit to Culture, Silver Medal, 2005

Signature
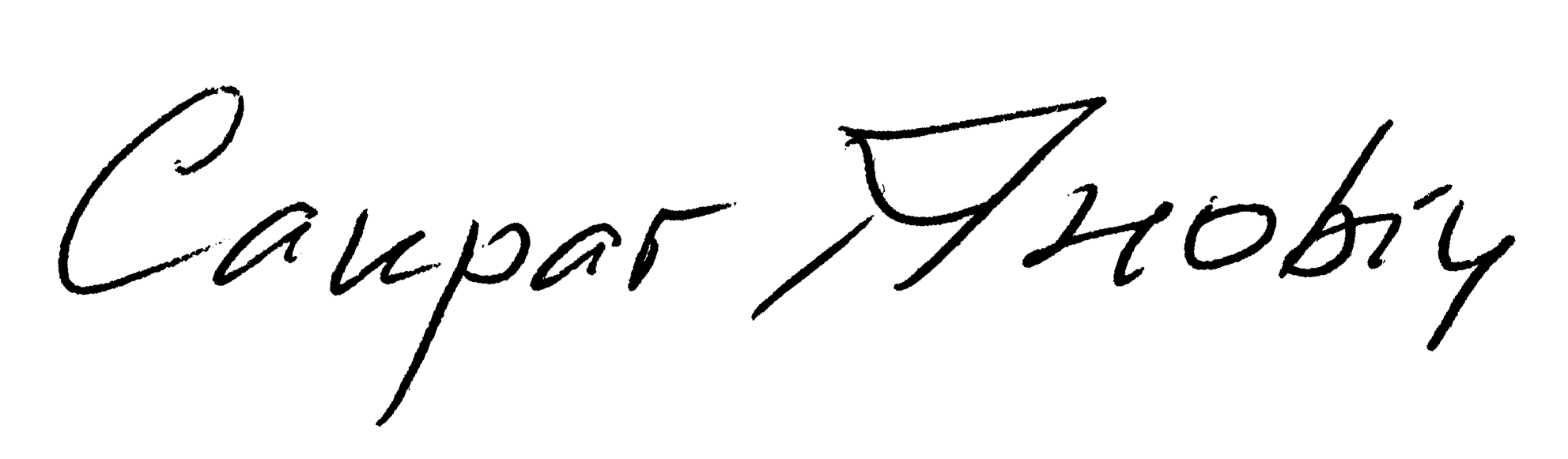

Sokrat Konstantinovich Janowicz (Belarusian: Сакрат Канстанцінавіч Яновіч; 1936–2013) was a Polish–Belarusian writer, essayist, journalist, publicist and translator of Belarusian literature.

== Career ==
Janowicz studied Polish Studies at the University of Warsaw.

In 1958, Janowicz co-founded of the Belarusian Literary Association, known as "Białowieża".

Janowicz wrote in both Polish and Belarusian.

== Awards ==
- Andrzej Drawicz Award (Polish: Nagrodę im. Andrzeja Drawicza), 2003.
- Gloria Artis Medal for Merit to Culture (Polish: Kulturze Gloria Artis), Silver Medal, 2005.
