= Janovice =

- Municipality
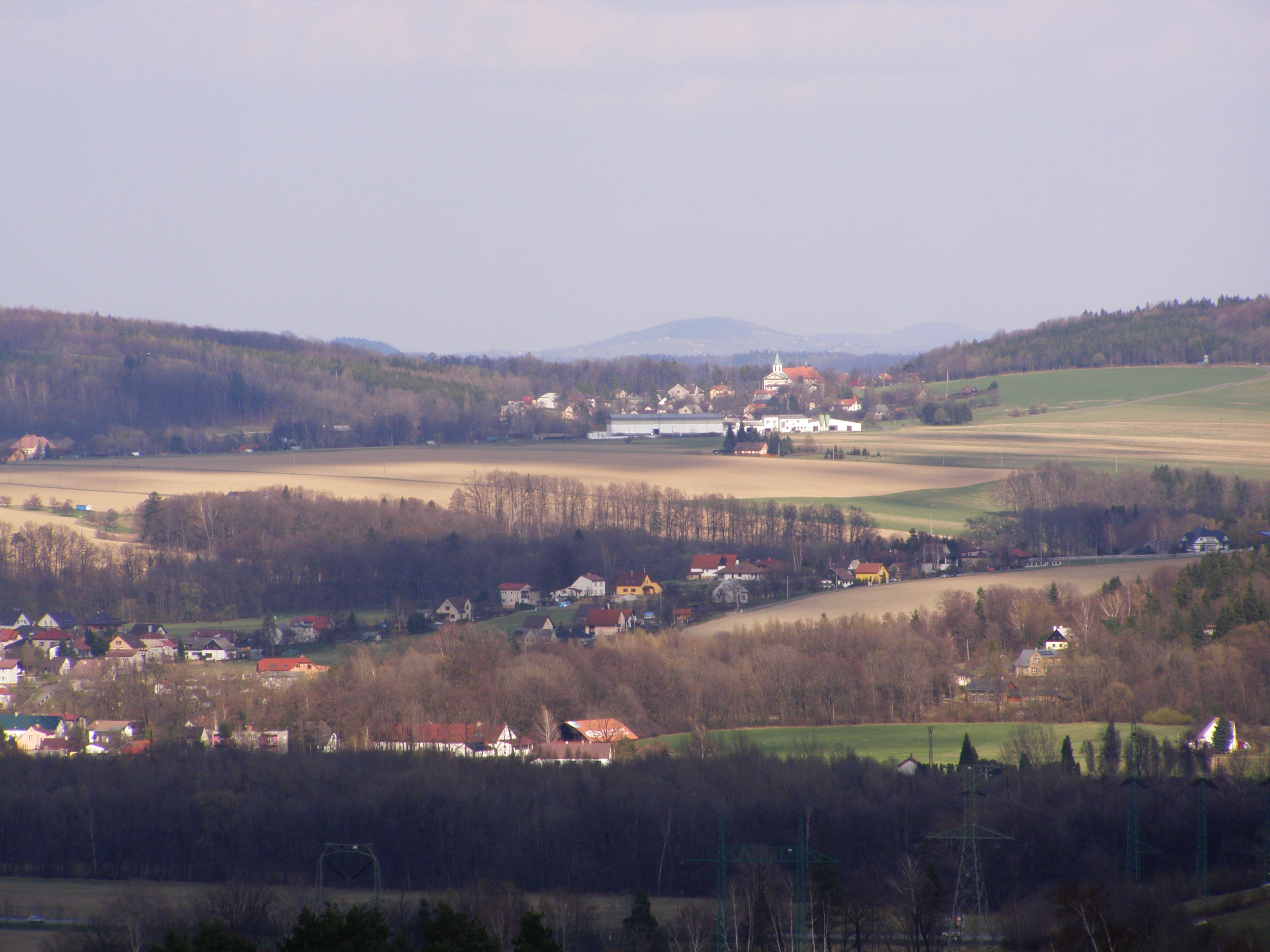
- General view of Janovice

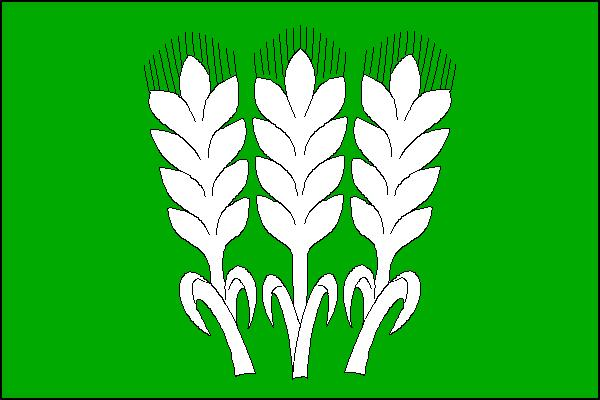
- Flag Coat of arms

- Location in the Czech Republic
- Coordinates: 49°37′17″N 18°24′22″E
- Country: Czech Republic
- Region: Moravian-Silesian
- District: Frýdek-Místek
- First mentioned: 1450

Area
  - Total: 13.16 km^{2} (5.08 sq mi)
- Elevation: 364 m (1,194 ft)

Population (2026-01-01)
  - Total: 2,052
  - Density: 155.9/km^{2} (403.8/sq mi)
- Time zone: UTC+1 (CET)
  - Summer (DST): UTC+2 (CEST)
- Postal codes: 739 02, 739 11
- Website: www.obecjanovice.cz

Janovice (German: Janowitz, Polish: Janowice) is a municipality and village in Frýdek-Místek District in the Moravian-Silesian Region of the Czech Republic. It has about 2,100 inhabitants.

== Geography ==
Janovice is located about 6 kilometres (4 mi) south of Frýdek-Místek and 22 km (14 mi) south of Ostrava, in the historical region of Cieszyn Silesia. It lies in the Moravian-Silesian Foothills. The highest point is at 510 m (1,670 ft) above sea level. The Říčka Stream flows through the municipality.

== History ==
The first written mention of Janovice is in a deed of Bolesław II, Duke of Cieszyn from 1450 as Janowicze. It was a part of the Frýdek estate within the Duchy of Teschen. In 1573 it was sold as one of 16 villages and the town of Friedeck and formed a state country split from the Duchy of Teschen.

After World War I and fall of Austria-Hungary, the municipality became a part of Czechoslovakia. In March 1939, it became a part of Protectorate of Bohemia and Moravia. After World War II it was restored to Czechoslovakia.

== Demographics ==
Historical population

Year	Pop.	±%
1869	1,831	—
1880	1,914	+4.5%
1890	1,819	−5.0%
1900	1,907	+4.8%
1910	1,868	−2.0%

Year	Pop.	±%
1921	1,713	−8.3%
1930	1,730	+1.0%
1950	1,618	−6.5%
1961	1,747	+8.0%
1970	1,653	−5.4%

Year	Pop.	±%
1980	1,591	−3.8%
1991	1,575	−1.0%
2001	1,684	+6.9%
2011	1,896	+12.6%
2021	1,904	+0.4%

Source: Censuses

== Transport ==
There are no railways or major roads passing through the municipality.

== Sights ==
The most valuable building is the Church of Saint Joseph. It was built in the neo-Gothic style in 1887–1891.
