= Rūja =

River in Estonia and Latvia

Rūja River
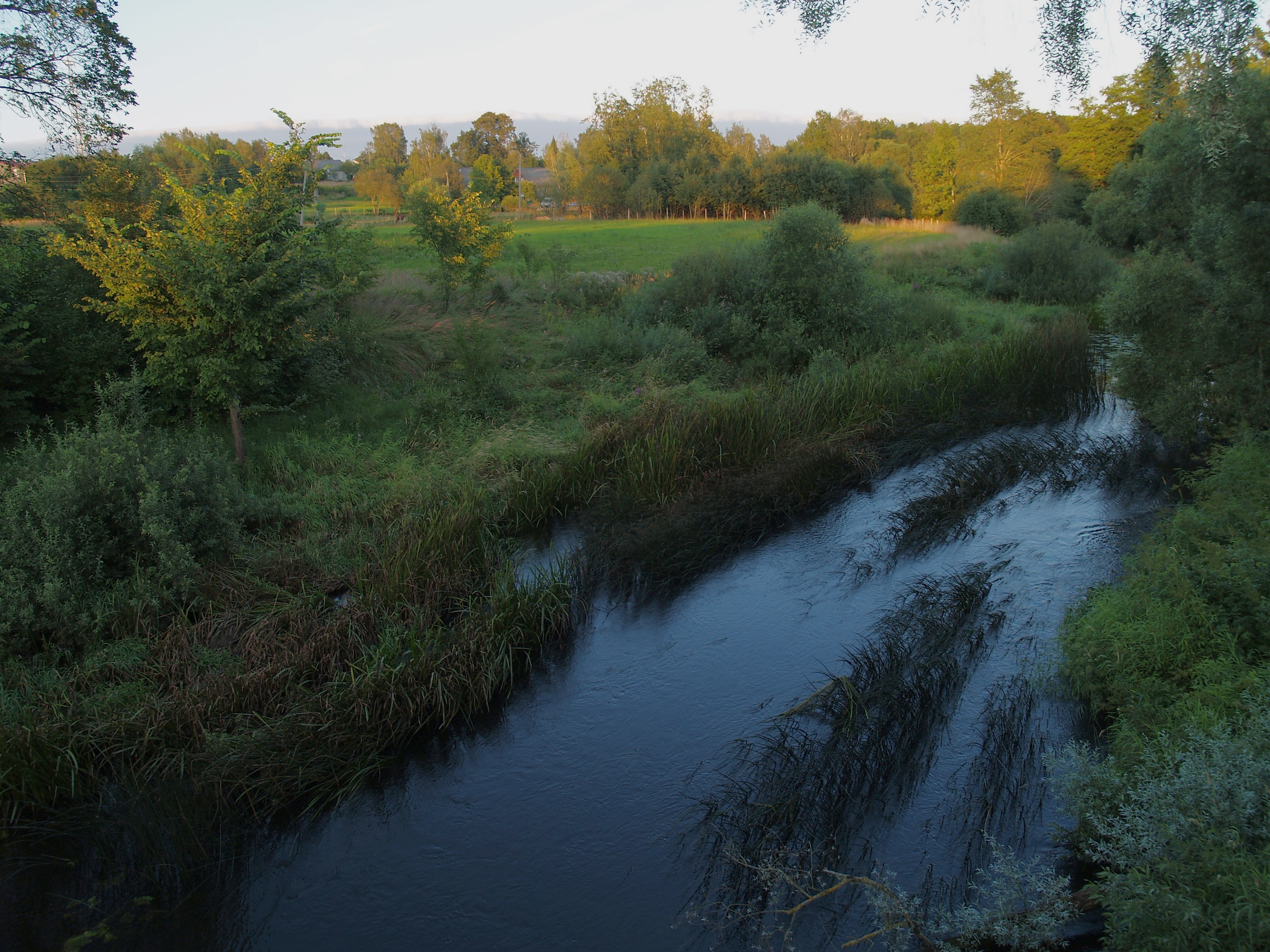

Location
- Countries: Estonia; Latvia

Physical characteristics
- Mouth: Lake Burtnieks
  - coordinates: 57°45′59″N 25°14′13″E
- Length: 77 km (48 mi)

The Rūja River (Estonian: Ruhja) is a river on the Estonia–Latvia border. The river is 77 km long (of which 72 km is in Latvia). The river starts from Ruhijärv and flows into Lake Burtnieks.
