= Janowitz =

Janowitz is a surname, a Yiddish-language variant of the Polish-language surname Janowicz. Notable people with the surname include:

- Brenda Janowitz, American writer and attorney
- Gundula Janowitz (born 1937), Austrian singer
- Franz Janowitz (1892–1917), Austrian poet and soldier
- Hans Janowitz (1890–1954), Czech-German writer
- Henry Janowitz (1915–2008), American physician and academic
- Morris Janowitz (1919–1988), American sociologist
- Tama Janowitz (born 1957), American writer
- Will Janowitz (born 1980), American actor
