= Siedliska =

Siedliska may refer to the following places in Poland:

- Siedliska, Lower Silesian Voivodeship (south-west Poland)
- Siedliska, Biłgoraj County in Lublin Voivodeship (east Poland)
- Siedliska, Krasnystaw County in Lublin Voivodeship (east Poland)
- Siedliska, Lubartów County in Lublin Voivodeship (east Poland)
- Siedliska, Łódź Voivodeship (central Poland)
- Siedliska, Łuków County in Lublin Voivodeship (east Poland)
- Siedliska, Gorlice County in Lesser Poland Voivodeship (south Poland)
- Siedliska, Gmina Lubycza Królewska, Tomaszów County in Lublin Voivodeship (east Poland)
- Siedliska, Miechów County in Lesser Poland Voivodeship (south Poland)
- Siedliska, Włodawa County in Lublin Voivodeship (east Poland)
- Siedliska, Zamość County in Lublin Voivodeship (east Poland)
- Siedliska, Gmina Koniusza in Lesser Poland Voivodeship (south Poland)
- Siedliska, Gmina Koszyce in Lesser Poland Voivodeship (south Poland)
- Siedliska, Tarnów County in Lesser Poland Voivodeship (south Poland)
- Siedliska, Brzozów County in Subcarpathian Voivodeship (south-east Poland)
- Siedliska, Przemyśl County in Subcarpathian Voivodeship (south-east Poland)
- Siedliska, Rzeszów County in Subcarpathian Voivodeship (south-east Poland)
- Siedliska, Masovian Voivodeship (east-central Poland)
- Siedliska, Konin County in Greater Poland Voivodeship (west-central Poland)
- Siedliska, Turek County in Greater Poland Voivodeship (west-central Poland)
- Siedliska, Racibórz County in Silesian Voivodeship (south Poland)
- Siedliska, Zawiercie County in Silesian Voivodeship (south Poland)
- Siedliska, Olesno County in Opole Voivodeship (south-west Poland)
- Siedliska, Opole County in Opole Voivodeship (south-west Poland)
- Siedliska, Ełk County in Warmian-Masurian Voivodeship (north Poland)
- Siedliska, Giżycko County in Warmian-Masurian Voivodeship (north Poland)
- Siedliska, Szczytno County in Warmian-Masurian Voivodeship (north Poland)
