= Bobrów =

Bobrów may refer to the following places in Poland:

- Bobrów in Gmina Miłkowice, Legnica County in Lower Silesian Voivodeship (SW Poland)
- Other places called Bobrów (listed in Polish Wikipedia)
