= Bagatelka =

Bagatelka refers to the following places in Poland:

- Bagatelka, Greater Poland Voivodeship
- Bagatelka, Łódź Voivodeship
