= Ulesie =

Ulesie may refer to the following places in Poland:

- Ulesie, Lower Silesian Voivodeship (south-west Poland)
- Ulesie, Silesian Voivodeship (south Poland)
- Ulesie, Warmian-Masurian Voivodeship (north Poland)
