= Sędziszowa =

Sędziszowa may refer to the following places in Poland:

- Sędziszowa, Lower Silesian Voivodeship (south-west Poland)
- Sędziszowa, Lesser Poland Voivodeship (south Poland)
