= Lipce =

Lipce may refer to the following places:

In Poland:

- Lipce, Lower Silesian Voivodeship (south-west Poland)
- Lipce, West Pomeranian Voivodeship (north-west Poland)

In Slovenia:

- Lipce, Jesenice, a settlement in the Municipality of Jesenice

== See also ==
- Lipce Reymontowskie, Skierniewice County, Łódź Voivodeship
