= Jankowa =

Jankowa may refer to the following places in Poland:

- Jankowa, Lower Silesian Voivodeship (south-west Poland)
- Jankowa, Lublin Voivodeship (east Poland)
- Jankowa, Lesser Poland Voivodeship (south Poland)
- Jankowa Żagańska, Żagań County, Lubusz Voivodeship

It is also an archaic feminine form of the Polish surname Janek.
