= Bobrow =

Bobrow may refer to:

- Bobrów, Legnica County, village in Gmina Miłkowice, Legnica County in Lower Silesian Voivodeship (SW Poland)

== People ==
- Andy Bobrow, American television writer and producer
- Daniel G. Bobrow (1935–2017), American computer scientist
- Martin Bobrow (born 1938), British geneticist
- Mitchell Bobrow (born 1950), American martial arts fighter
- Warren Bobrow, American mixologist and chef

== See also ==
- Bobrowski
