= Stróżna =

- Village
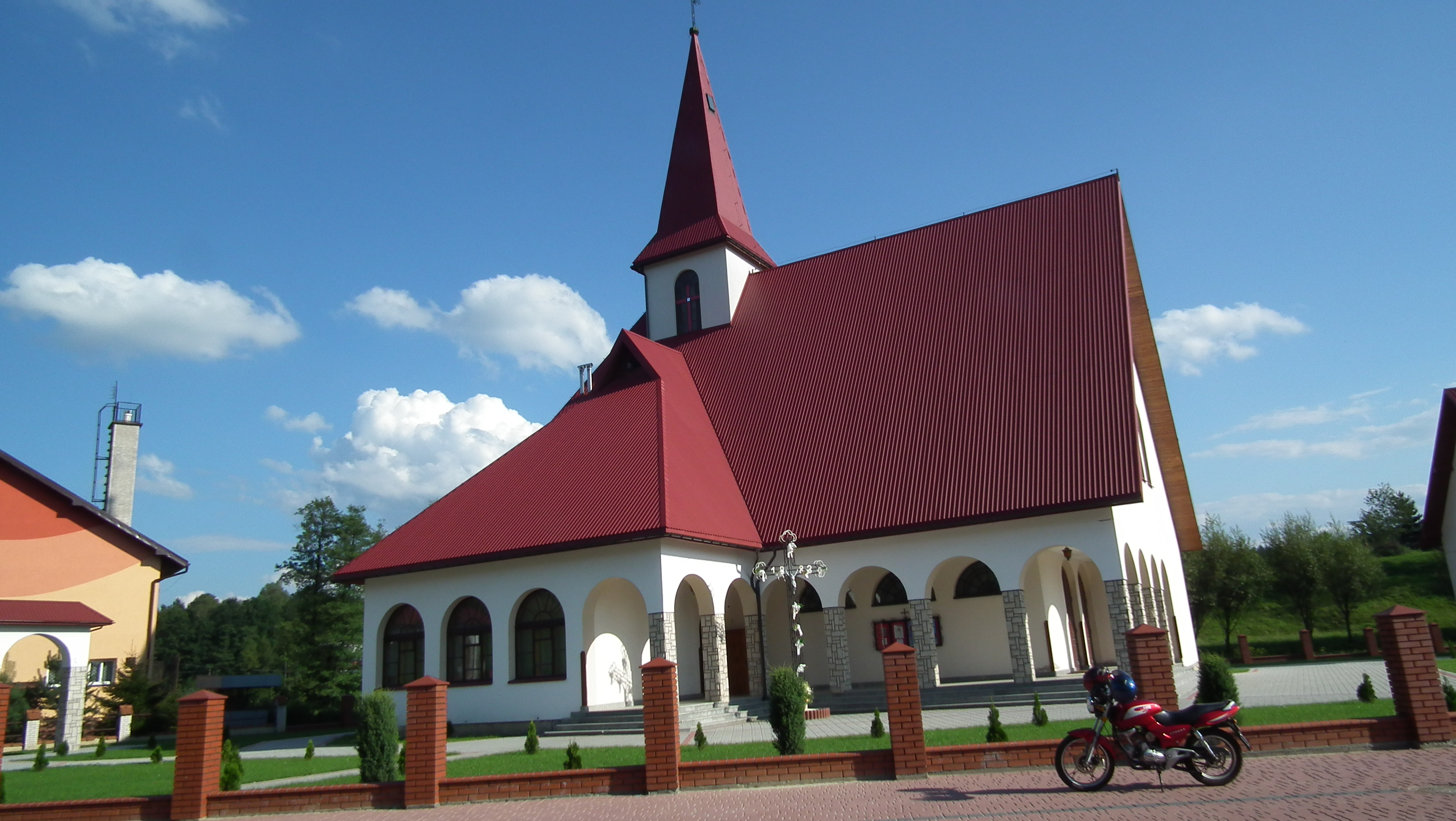
- Catholic church

- Location within Poland
- Coordinates: 49°41′49″N 20°59′14″E
- Country: Poland
- Voivodeship: Lesser Poland
- County: Gorlice
- Gmina: Bobowa
- Population (approx.): 930

Stróżna [ˈstruʐna] is a village in the administrative district of Gmina Bobowa, within Gorlice County, Lesser Poland Voivodeship, in southern Poland.

The village has an approximate population of 930.
