= Kopaniny, Gmina Sokolniki =

Kopaniny
- Village
- Location within Poland
- Coordinates: 51°18′12″N 18°17′14″E
- Country: Poland
- Voivodeship: Łódź
- County: Wieruszów
- Gmina: Sokolniki

Kopaniny [kɔpaˈninɨ] is a village in the administrative district of Gmina Sokolniki, within Wieruszów County, Łódź Voivodeship, in central Poland.
