= Grzymalin =

- Village
- Location within Poland
- Coordinates: 51°16′32″N 16°05′46″E
- Country: Poland
- Voivodeship: Lower Silesian
- County: Legnica
- Gmina: Miłkowice

Grzymalin [ɡʐɨˈmalin] is a village in the administrative district of Gmina Miłkowice, within Legnica County, Lower Silesian Voivodeship, in south-western Poland.
