= Wilczyska, Lesser Poland Voivodeship =

Wilczyska
- Village
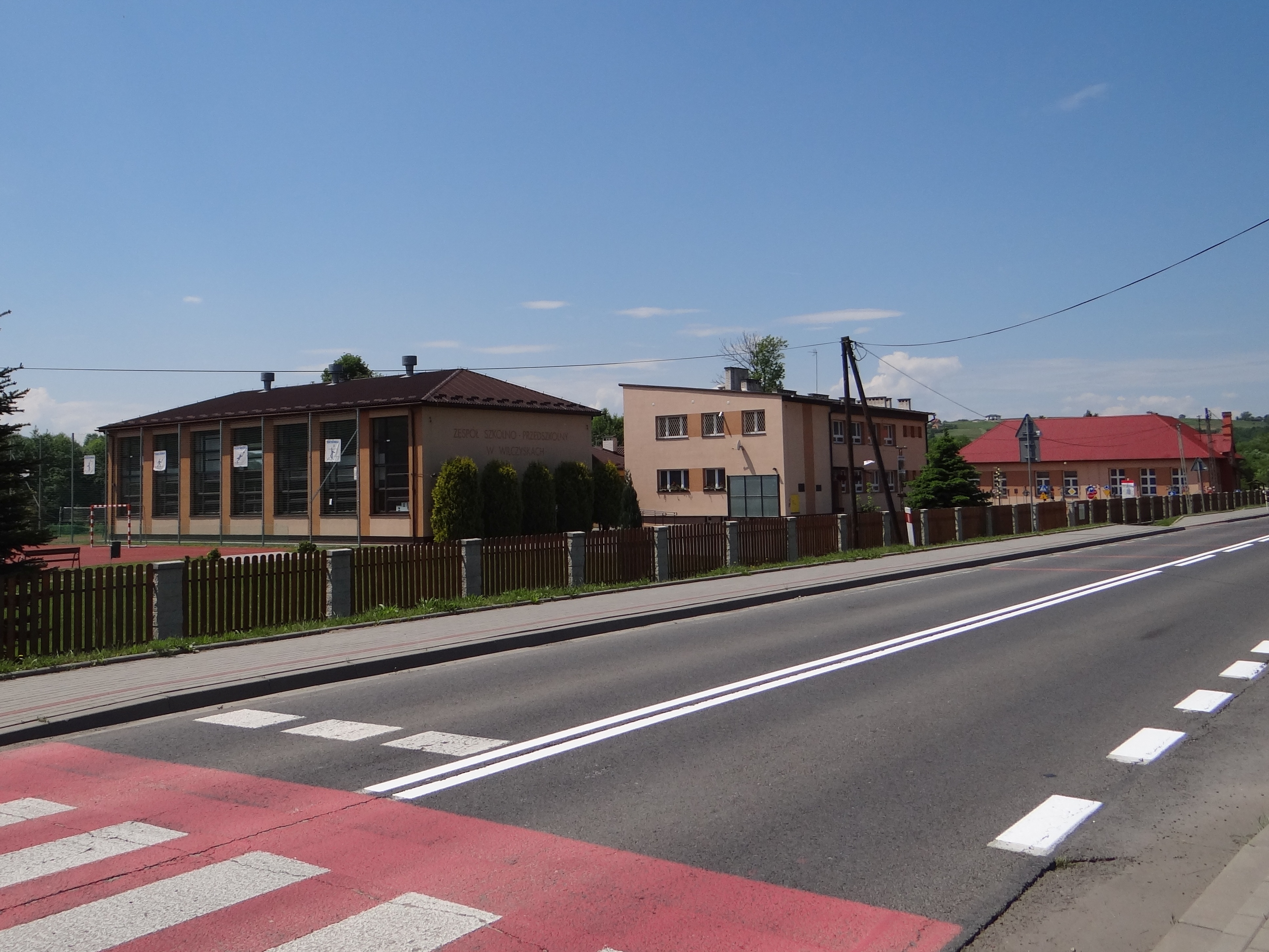

- Location within Poland
- Coordinates: 49°40′N 20°56′E
- Country: Poland
- Voivodeship: Lesser Poland
- County: Gorlice
- Gmina: Bobowa

Population
  - Total: 860

Wilczyska [vilˈt͡ʂɨska] is a village in the administrative district of Gmina Bobowa, within Gorlice County, Lesser Poland Voivodeship, in southern Poland.

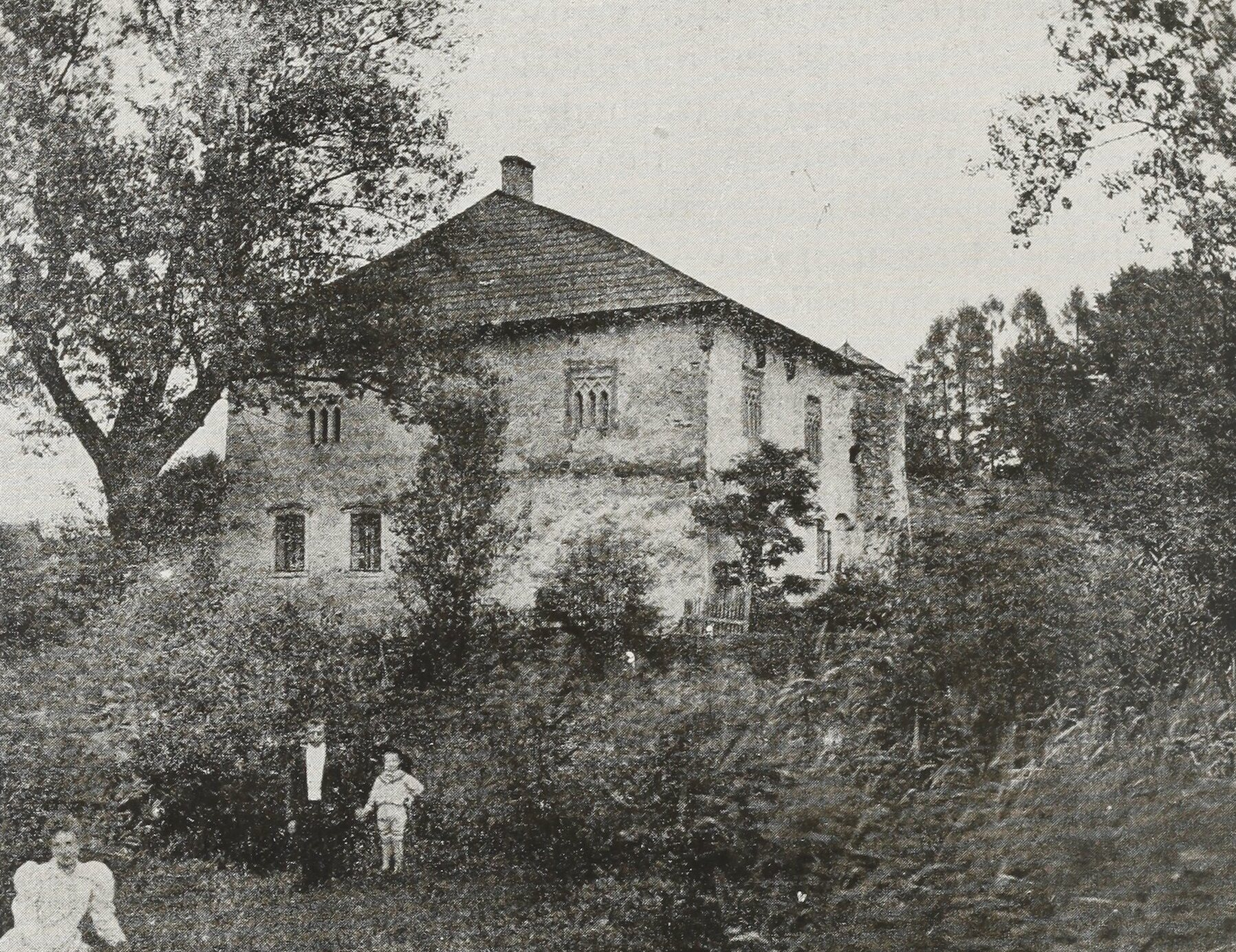
Manor house in Jeżów-Wilczyska before 1930
