= Wyglądacze =

- Village
- Location within Poland
- Coordinates: 51°19′33″N 18°26′11″E
- Country: Poland
- Voivodeship: Łódź
- County: Wieruszów
- Gmina: Sokolniki
- Population: 32

Wyglądacze [vɨɡlɔnˈdat͡ʂɛ] is a village in the administrative district of Gmina Sokolniki, within Wieruszów County, Łódź Voivodeship, in central Poland.
