= Ryś, Łódź Voivodeship =

Ryś
- Village
- Location within Poland
- Coordinates: 51°19′N 18°24′E
- Country: Poland
- Voivodeship: Łódź
- County: Wieruszów
- Gmina: Sokolniki

Ryś [rɨɕ] is a village in the administrative district of Gmina Sokolniki, within Wieruszów County, Łódź Voivodeship, in central Poland.
