= Miłkowice, Lower Silesian Voivodeship =

Miłkowice
- Village
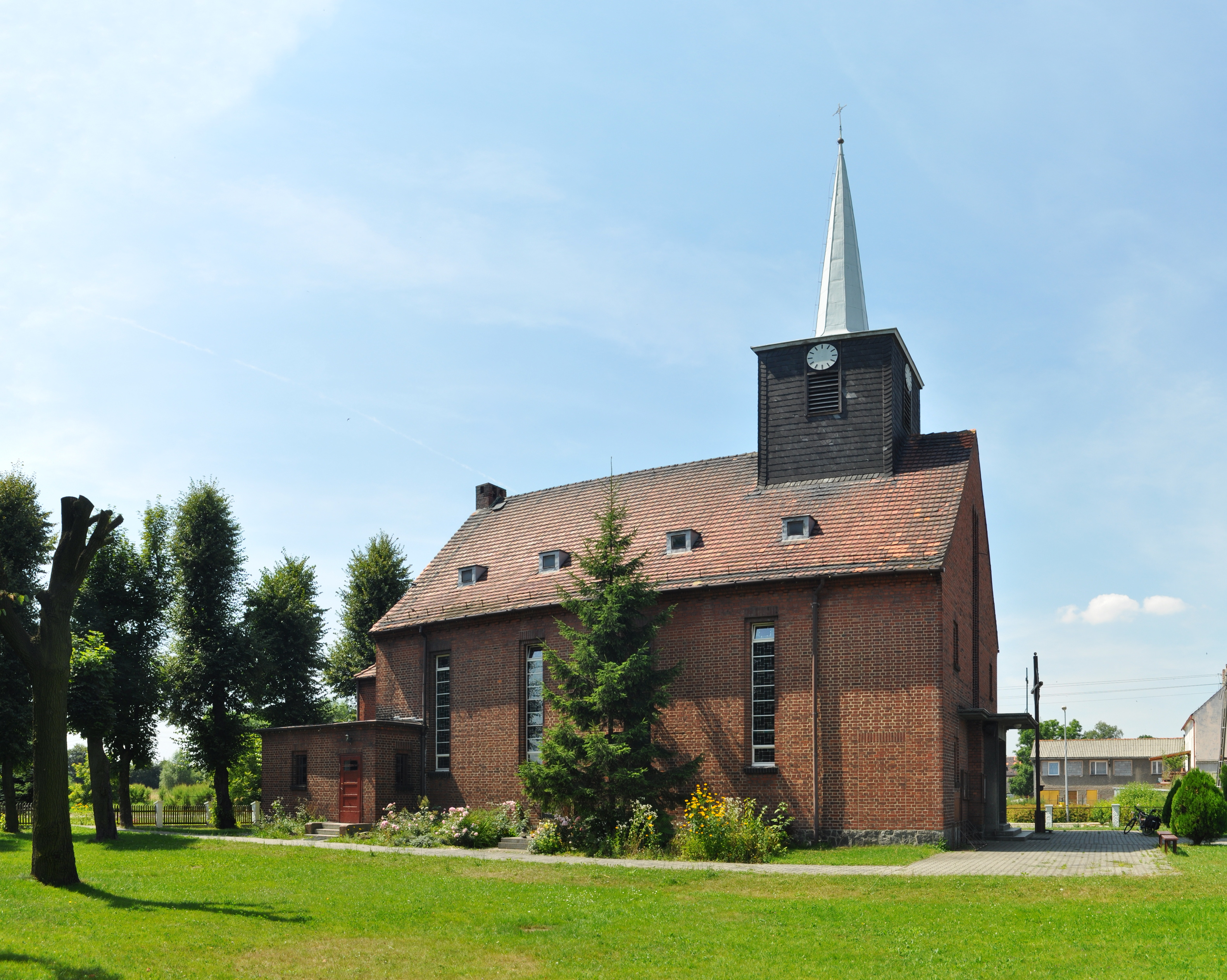
- Church of the Immaculate Conception of the Virgin Mary

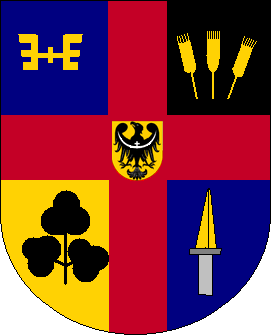
- Coat of arms

- Location within Poland
- Coordinates: 51°15′27″N 16°03′24″E
- Country: Poland
- Voivodeship: Lower Silesian
- County: Legnica
- Gmina: Miłkowice

Population
  - Total: 2,000

Miłkowice [miu̯kɔˈvit͡sɛ] (German: Arnsdorf) is a village (former town) in Legnica County, Lower Silesian Voivodeship, in south-western Poland. It is the seat of the administrative district (gmina) called Gmina Miłkowice.
