= Góry, Wieruszów County =

Góry
- Village
- Location within Poland
- Coordinates: 51°20′1″N 18°23′40″E
- Country: Poland
- Voivodeship: Łódź
- County: Wieruszów
- Gmina: Sokolniki

Góry [ˈɡurɨ] is a village in the administrative district of Gmina Sokolniki, within Wieruszów County, Łódź Voivodeship, in central Poland.
