= Rzeszotary, Lower Silesian Voivodeship =

Rzeszotary
- Village
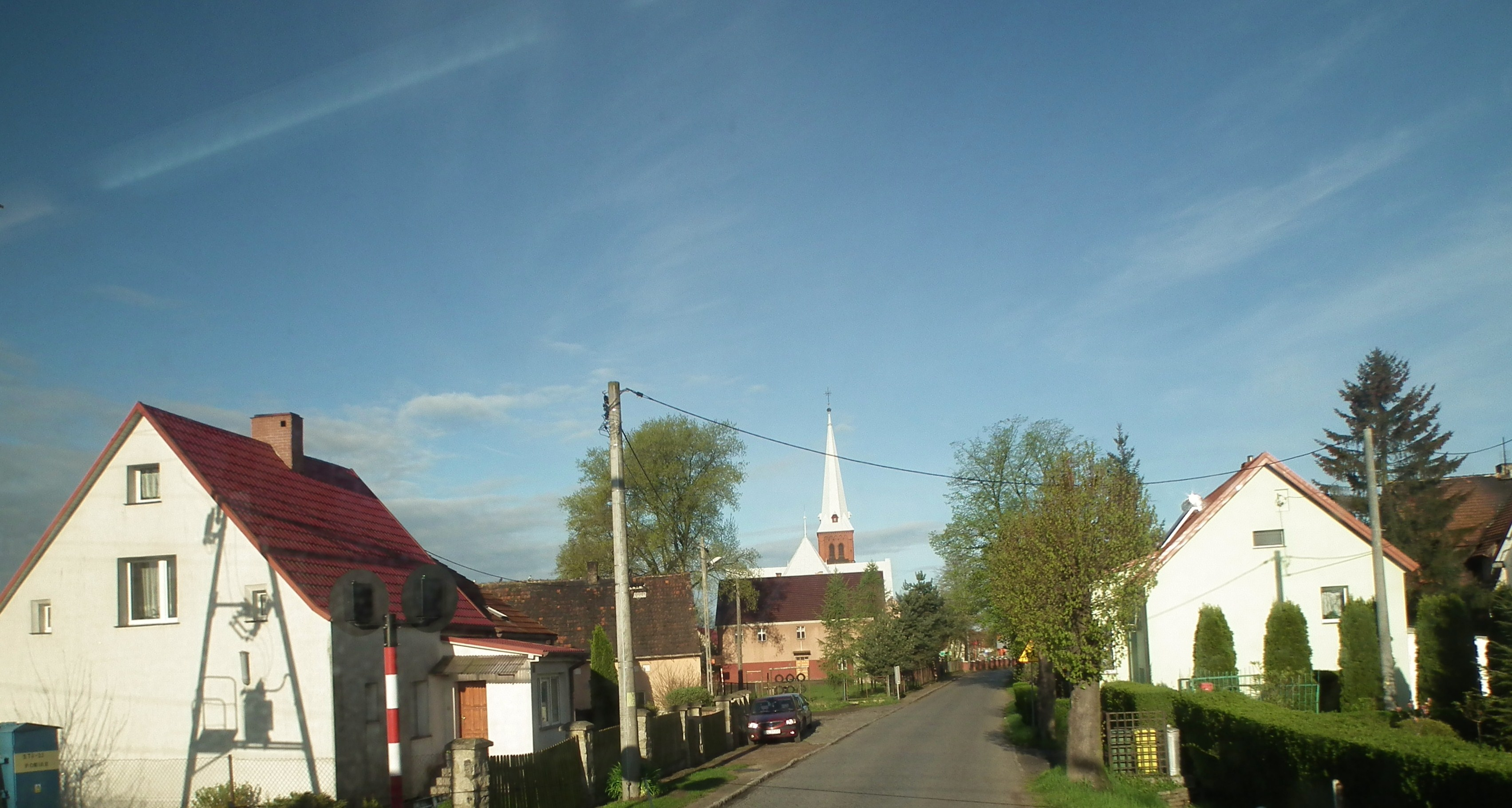

- Location within Poland
- Coordinates: 51°15′0″N 16°9′13″E
- Country: Poland
- Voivodeship: Lower Silesian
- County: Legnica
- Gmina: Miłkowice

Population (approx.)
  - Total: 960
- Time zone: UTC+1 (CET)
  - Summer (DST): UTC+2 (CEST)
- Vehicle registration: DLE

Rzeszotary [ʐɛʂɔˈtarɨ] is a village in the administrative district of Gmina Miłkowice, within Legnica County, Lower Silesian Voivodeship, in south-western Poland.

The village has an approximate population of 940

.
