= Goślinów =

- Village
- Location within Poland
- Coordinates: 51°12′43″N 16°03′29″E
- Country: Poland
- Voivodeship: Lower Silesian
- County: Legnica
- Gmina: Miłkowice

Goślinów [ɡɔˈɕlinuf] is a village in the administrative district of Gmina Miłkowice, within Legnica County, Lower Silesian Voivodeship, in south-western Poland.
