= Szustry =

- Village
- Location within Poland
- Coordinates: 51°20′N 18°22′E
- Country: Poland
- Voivodeship: Łódź
- County: Wieruszów
- Gmina: Sokolniki

Szustry [ˈʂustrɨ] is a village in the administrative district of Gmina Sokolniki, within Wieruszów County, Łódź Voivodeship, in central Poland.
