= Zdzierczyzna =

- Village
- Location within Poland
- Coordinates: 51°21′N 18°21′E
- Country: Poland
- Voivodeship: Łódź
- County: Wieruszów
- Gmina: Sokolniki

Zdzierczyzna [zd͡ʑɛrˈt͡ʂɨzna] is a village in the administrative district of Gmina Sokolniki, within Wieruszów County, Łódź Voivodeship, in central Poland.
