= Zagórze, Wieruszów County =

Zagórze
- Village
- Location within Poland
- Coordinates: 51°18′N 18°19′E
- Country: Poland
- Voivodeship: Łódź
- County: Wieruszów
- Gmina: Sokolniki

Zagórze [zaˈɡuʐɛ] is a village in the administrative district of Gmina Sokolniki, within Wieruszów County, Łódź Voivodeship, in central Poland.
