= Góry-Parcela =

- Village
- Location within Poland
- Coordinates: 51°19′N 18°24′E
- Country: Poland
- Voivodeship: Łódź
- County: Wieruszów
- Gmina: Sokolniki

Góry-Parcela [ˈɡurɨ parˈt͡sɛla] is a village in the administrative district of Gmina Sokolniki, within Wieruszów County, Łódź Voivodeship, in central Poland.
