= Brzana Dolna =

- Village
- Location within Poland
- Coordinates: 49°43′N 20°56′E
- Country: Poland
- Voivodeship: Lesser Poland
- County: Gorlice
- Gmina: Bobowa

Brzana Dolna [ˈbʐana ˈdɔlna] is a village in the administrative district of Gmina Bobowa, within Gorlice County, Lesser Poland Voivodeship, in southern Poland.

The name Brzana Dolna means "Lower Brzana". The village and Brzana Górna ("Upper Brzana") make up a single sołectwo called Brzana.
