= Nowy Ochędzyn =

- Village
- Location within Poland
- Coordinates: 51°18′15″N 18°15′31″E
- Country: Poland
- Voivodeship: Łódź
- County: Wieruszów
- Gmina: Sokolniki
- Time zone: UTC+1 (CET)
  - Summer (DST): UTC+2 (CEST)
- Vehicle registration: EWE

Nowy Ochędzyn [ˈnɔvɨ ɔˈxɛnd͡zɨn] is a village in the administrative district of Gmina Sokolniki, within Wieruszów County, Łódź Voivodeship, in central Poland.

== History ==
During the German occupation of Poland (World War II), in 1940, the German gendarmerie carried out expulsions of Poles, who were placed in a transit camp in Łódź, and then young Poles were deported to forced labour in Germany and German-occupied France, and others were deported to the General Government in the more eastern part of German-occupied Poland. Houses and farms of expelled Poles were handed over to German colonists as part of the Lebensraum policy.

== Transport ==
The Voivodeship road 482 passes through Nowy Ochędzyn, and the S8 highway runs nearby, north of the village.
