= Gniewomirowice =

- Village
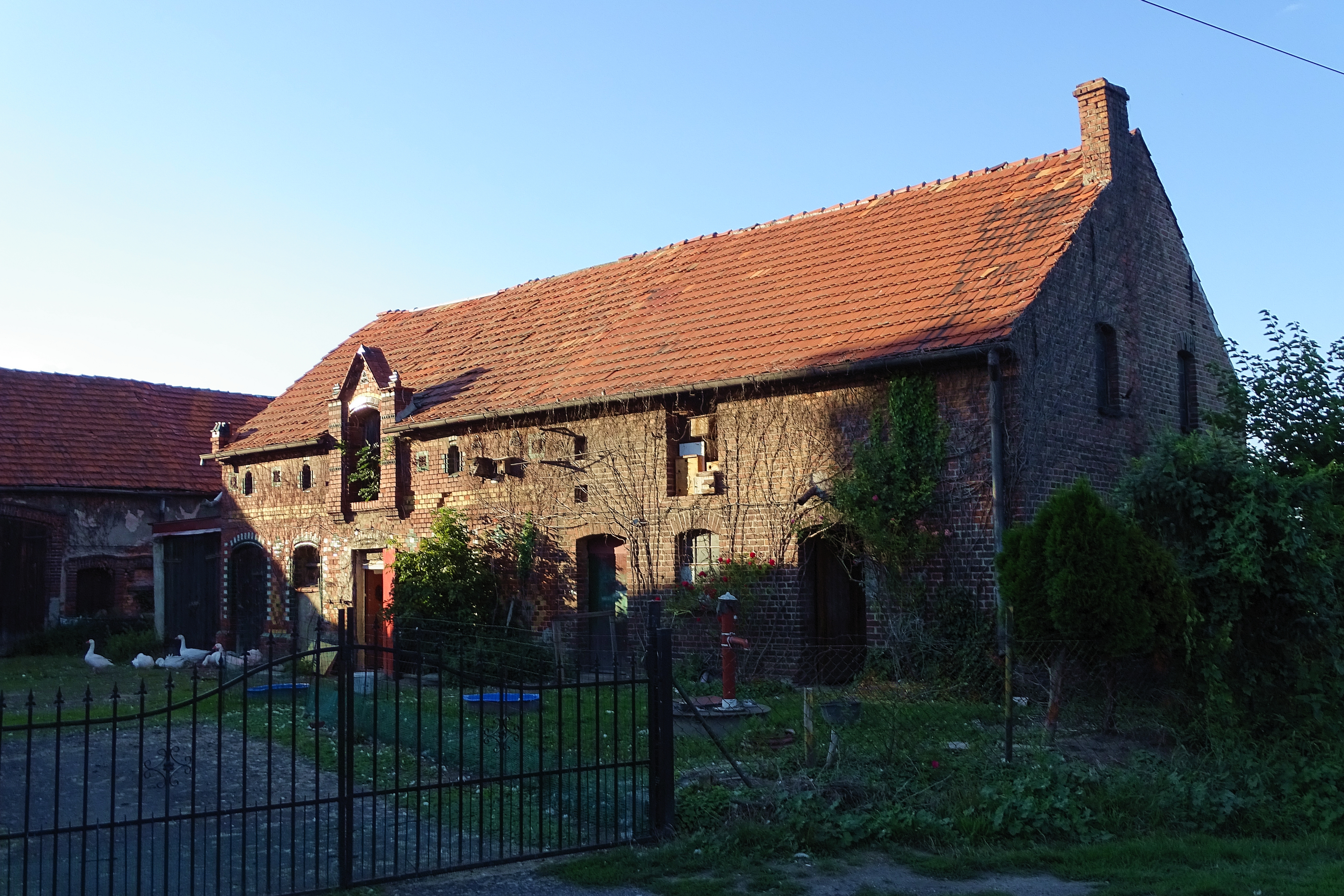

- Location within Poland
- Coordinates: 51°13′41″N 16°04′25″E
- Country: Poland
- Voivodeship: Lower Silesian
- County: Legnica
- Gmina: Miłkowice

Gniewomirowice [ɡɲɛvɔmirɔˈvit͡sɛ] is a village in the administrative district of Gmina Miłkowice, within Legnica County, Lower Silesian Voivodeship, in south-western Poland.
