= Borki Pichelskie =

- Village
- Location within Poland
- Coordinates: 51°19′28″N 18°22′38″E
- Country: Poland
- Voivodeship: Łódź
- County: Wieruszów
- Gmina: Sokolniki

Borki Pichelskie [ˈbɔrki piˈxɛlskʲɛ] is a village in the administrative district of Gmina Sokolniki, within Wieruszów County, Łódź Voivodeship, in central Poland.
