= Pątnówek =

- Village
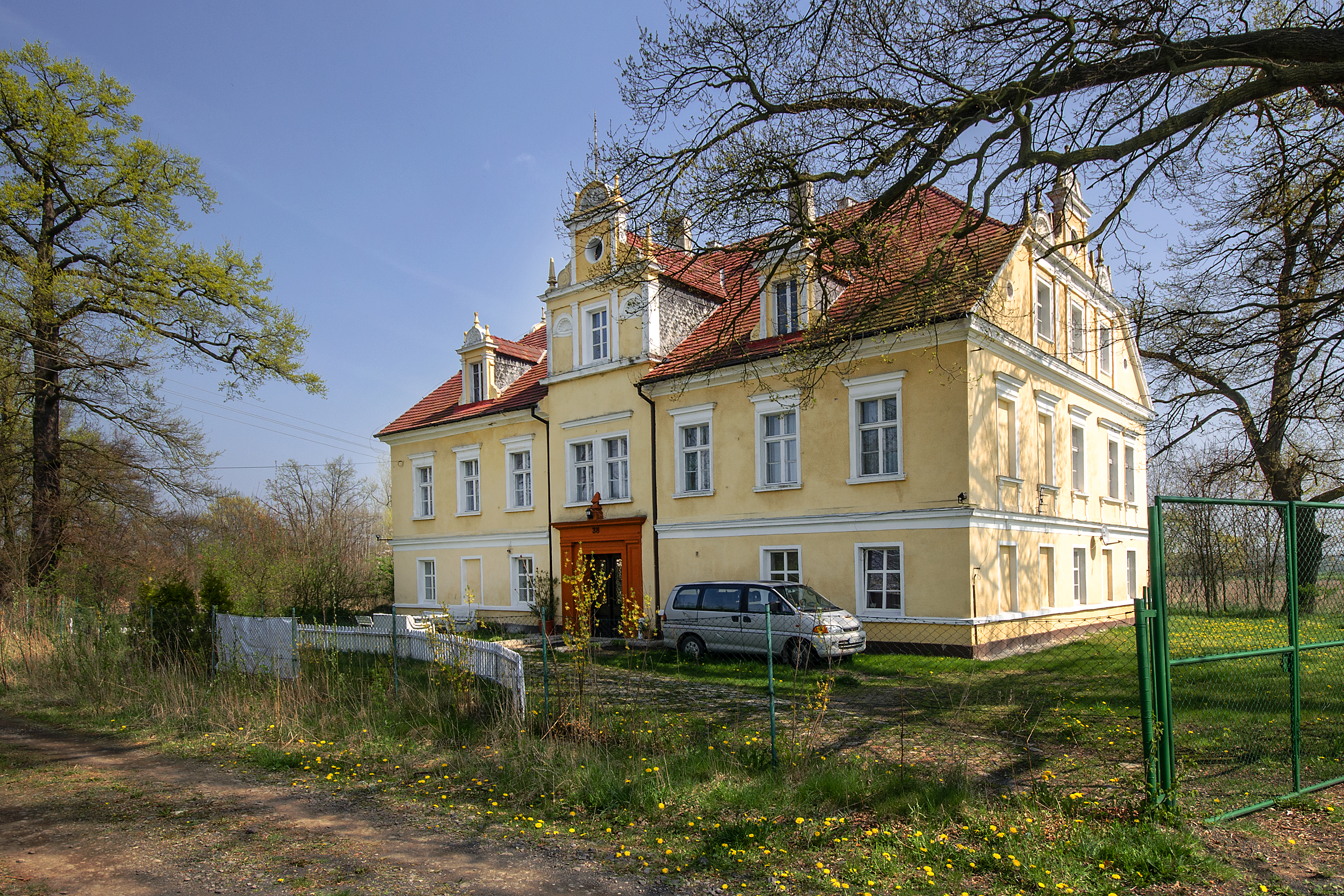
- Palace

- Location within Poland
- Coordinates: 51°14′N 16°7′E
- Country: Poland
- Voivodeship: Lower Silesian
- County: Legnica
- Gmina: Miłkowice

Pątnówek [pɔntˈnuvɛk] is a village in the administrative district of Gmina Miłkowice, within Legnica County, Lower Silesian Voivodeship, in south-western Poland.
