= Gmina Bobowa =

Gmina Bobowa Bobowa Commune
- Gmina
- Coat of arms
- Interactive map of Gmina Bobowa
- Coordinates (Bobowa): 49°42′N 20°56′E
- Country: Poland
- Voivodeship: Lesser Poland
- County: Gorlice
- Seat: Bobowa

Area
  - Total: 49.84 km^{2} (19.24 sq mi)

Population (2006)
  - Total: 9,134
  - Density: 183.3/km^{2} (474.7/sq mi)
- Website: http://www.bobowa.pl/

Gmina Bobowa is an urban-rural gmina (administrative district) in Gorlice County, Lesser Poland Voivodeship, in southern Poland. Its seat is the town of Bobowa, which lies approximately 18 kilometres (11 mi) west of Gorlice and 82 km (51 mi) south-east of the regional capital Kraków. (Bobowa gained town status on 1 January 2009 – prior to that date the district was classed as a rural gmina.)

The gmina covers an area of 49.84 square kilometres (19.2 sq mi), and as of 2006 its total population is 9,134, of which the population of Bobowa is 3,018.

== Villages ==
Apart from the town of Bobowa, the gmina contains the villages and settlements of Berdechów, Brzana Dolna, Brzana Górna (the latter two forming a single sołectwo called Brzana), Jankowa, Sędziszowa, Siedliska, Stróżna and Wilczyska.

== Neighbouring gminas ==
Gmina Bobowa is bordered by the gminas of Ciężkowice, Grybów, Korzenna and Łużna.
