= Dobrzejów =

- Village
- Location within Poland
- Coordinates: 51°15′03″N 16°11′04″E
- Country: Poland
- Voivodeship: Lower Silesian
- County: Legnica
- Gmina: Miłkowice

Dobrzejów [dɔˈbʐɛjuf] is a village in the administrative district of Gmina Miłkowice, within Legnica County, Lower Silesian Voivodeship, in south-western Poland.
