= Gmina Sokolniki =

Gmina Sokolniki Sokolniki Commune
- Gmina
- Flag Coat of arms

- Gmina Sokolniki district inside western edge of Łódź Voivodeship in Poland
- Coordinates (Sokolniki): 51°18′25″N 18°20′29″E
- Country: Poland
- Voivodeship: Łódź
- County: Wieruszów
- Seat: Sokolniki

Area
  - Total: 80.02 km^{2} (30.90 sq mi)

Population (2006)
  - Total: 4,875
  - Density: 60.92/km^{2} (157.8/sq mi)
- Website: https://www.sokolniki.pl

Gmina Sokolniki is a rural gmina (administrative district) in Wieruszów County, Łódź Voivodeship, in central Poland. Its seat is the village of Sokolniki, which lies approximately 14 kilometres (9 mi) east of Wieruszów and 95 km (59 mi) south-west of the regional capital Łódź.

The gmina covers an area of 80.02 square kilometres (30.9 sq mi), and as of 2006, its total population was 4,875.

== Villages ==
Gmina Sokolniki contains the villages and settlements of Bagatelka, Borki Pichelskie, Borki Sokolskie, Góry, Góry-Parcela, Gumnisko, Kopaniny, Maksymów, Malanów, Nowy Ochędzyn, Pichlice, Prusak, Ryś, Siedliska, Sokolniki, Stary Ochędzyn, Szustry, Tyble, Walichnowy, Wiktorówek, Wyglądacze, Zagórze and Zdzierczyzna.

== Neighbouring gminas ==
Gmina Sokolniki is bordered by the gminas of Biała, Czastary, Galewice, Lututów and Wieruszów.
