= Gumnisko, Wieruszów County =

Gumnisko
- Village
- Location within Poland
- Coordinates: 51°19′N 18°19′E
- Country: Poland
- Voivodeship: Łódź
- County: Wieruszów
- Gmina: Sokolniki

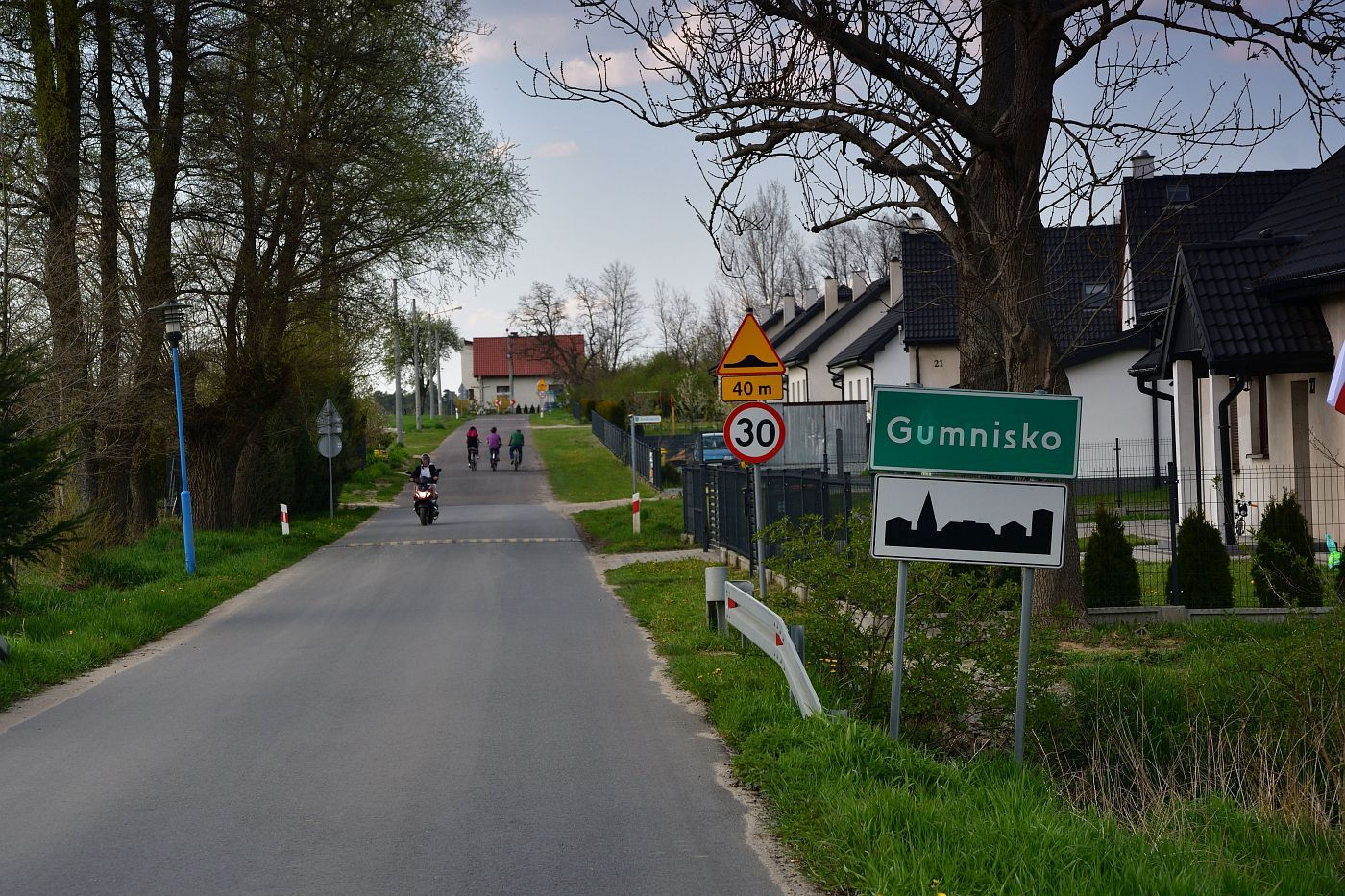
Gumnisko in 2022

Gumnisko [ɡumˈniskɔ] is a village in the administrative district of Gmina Sokolniki, within Wieruszów County, Łódź Voivodeship, in central Poland.
