= Sokolniki, Wieruszów County =

Sokolniki
- Village
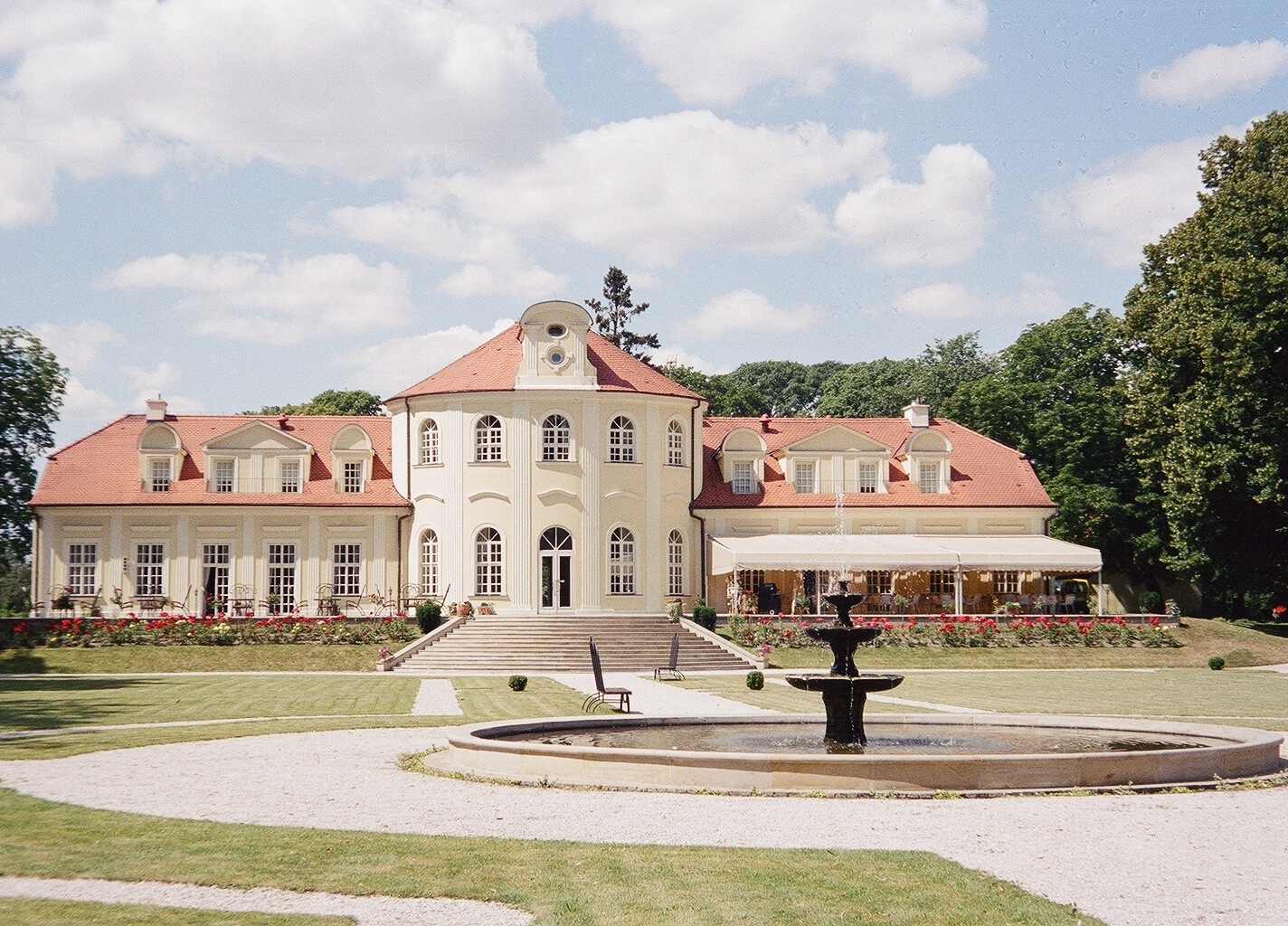
- Palace in Sokolniki

- Location within Poland
- Coordinates: 51°18′25″N 18°20′29″E
- Country: Poland
- Voivodeship: Łódź
- County: Wieruszów
- Gmina: Sokolniki

Population (approx.)
  - Total: 1,200
- Time zone: UTC+1 (CET)
  - Summer (DST): UTC+2 (CEST)
- Vehicle registration: EWE

Sokolniki [sɔkɔlˈɲikʲi] is a village in Wieruszów County, Łódź Voivodeship, in south-central Poland. It is the seat of the gmina (administrative district) called Gmina Sokolniki. It lies approximately 14 km (9 mi) east of Wieruszów and 95 km (59 mi) south-west of the regional capital Łódź.

The town has an approximate population of 1,200.

== History ==
The territory became a part of the emerging Polish state in the 10th century. In the 15th century, a Catholic parish and church were established in Sokolniki. Sokolniki was a royal village of Kingdom of Poland, administratively located in the Wieluń County in the Sieradz Voivodeship in the Greater Poland Province. The palace was built in 1775.

In 1827, the village had a population of 989.

During the German occupation of Poland (World War II), in 1940, the German gendarmerie carried out expulsions of Poles, who were placed in a transit camp in Łódź, and then young Poles were deported to forced labor in Germany and German-occupied France, and others were deported to the General Government in the more eastern part of German-occupied Poland. Houses and farms of expelled Poles were handed over to German colonists as part of the Lebensraum policy.

== Transport ==
The Voivodeship road 482 runs through Sokolniki, and its intersection with the S8 highway is located nearby, north-east of the village.
