= Stary Ochędzyn =

- Village
- Location within Poland
- Coordinates: 51°18′N 18°16′E
- Country: Poland
- Voivodeship: Łódź
- County: Wieruszów
- Gmina: Sokolniki

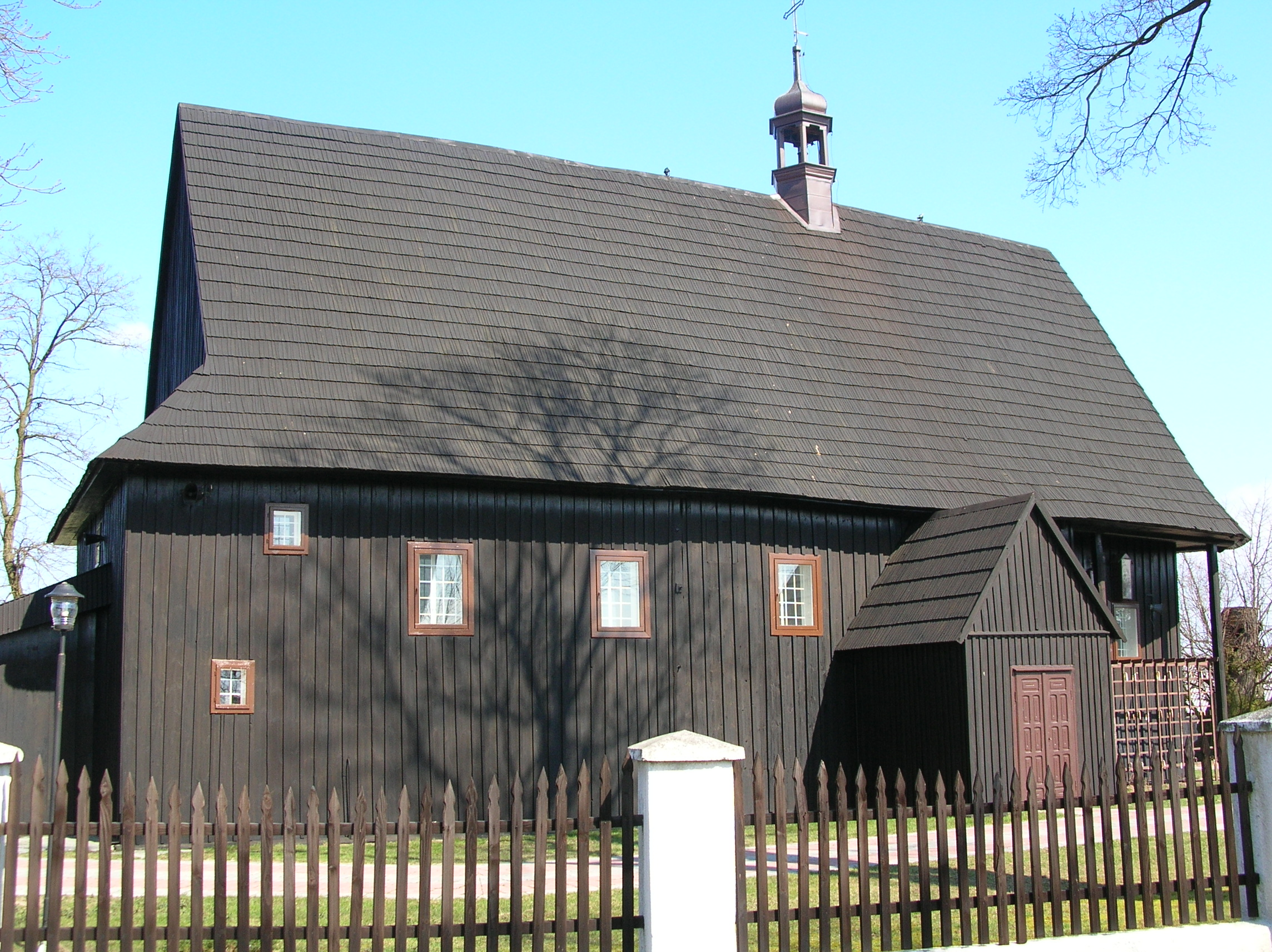
St. Anna's wooden church in Stary Ochędzyn

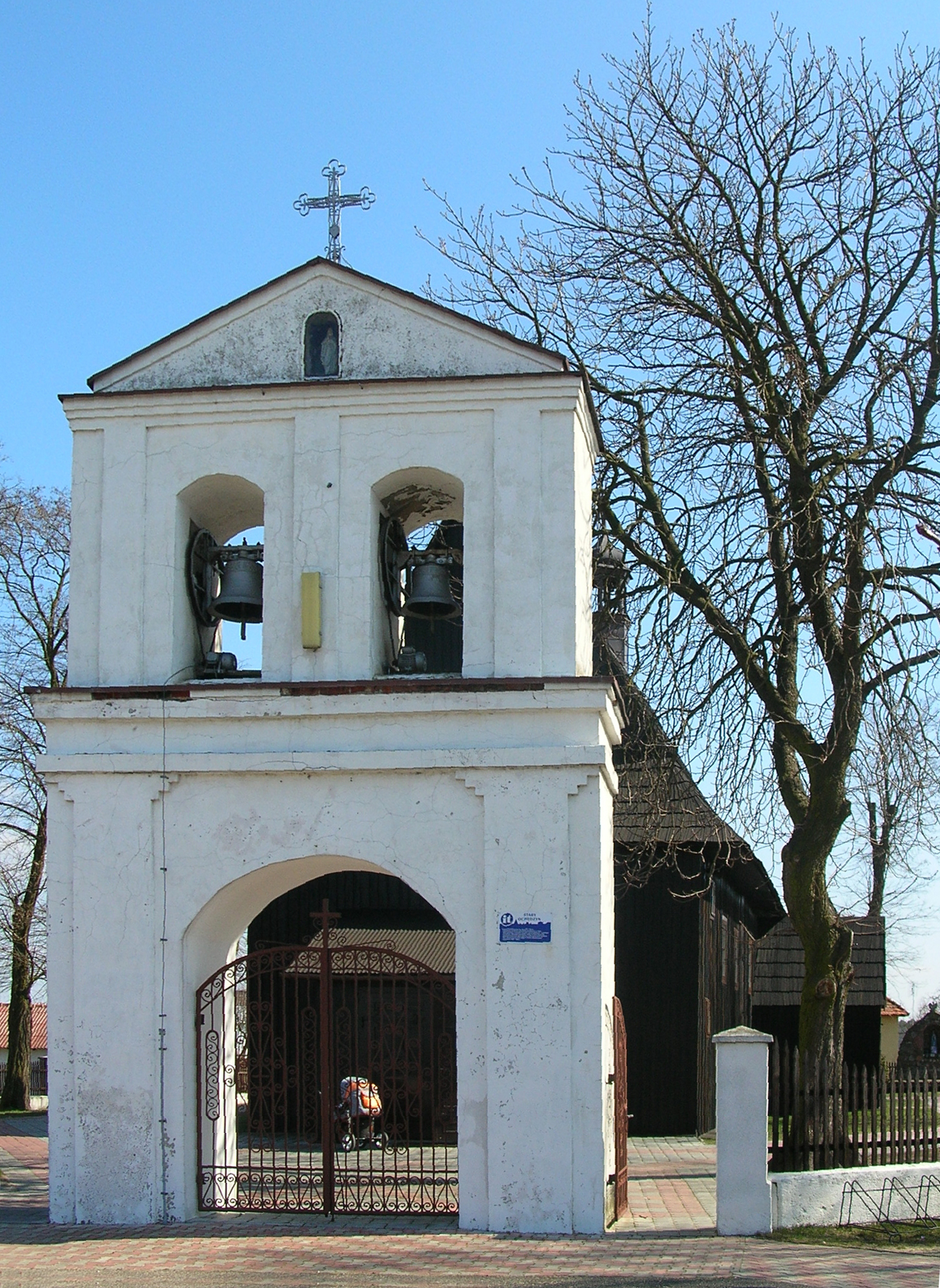
Bell tower near St. Anna's church in Stary Ochędzyn, built in 1925-1926

Stary Ochędzyn [ˈstarɨ ɔˈxɛnd͡zɨn] is a village in the administrative district of Gmina Sokolniki, within Wieruszów County, Łódź Voivodeship, in central Poland.
