= Berdechów =

- Village
- Location within Poland
- Coordinates: 49°43′22″N 20°56′23″E
- Country: Poland
- Voivodeship: Lesser Poland
- County: Gorlice
- Gmina: Bobowa

Berdechów [bɛrˈdɛxuf] is a village in the administrative district of Gmina Bobowa, within Gorlice County, Lesser Poland Voivodeship, in southern Poland.
