= Głuchowice =

- Village
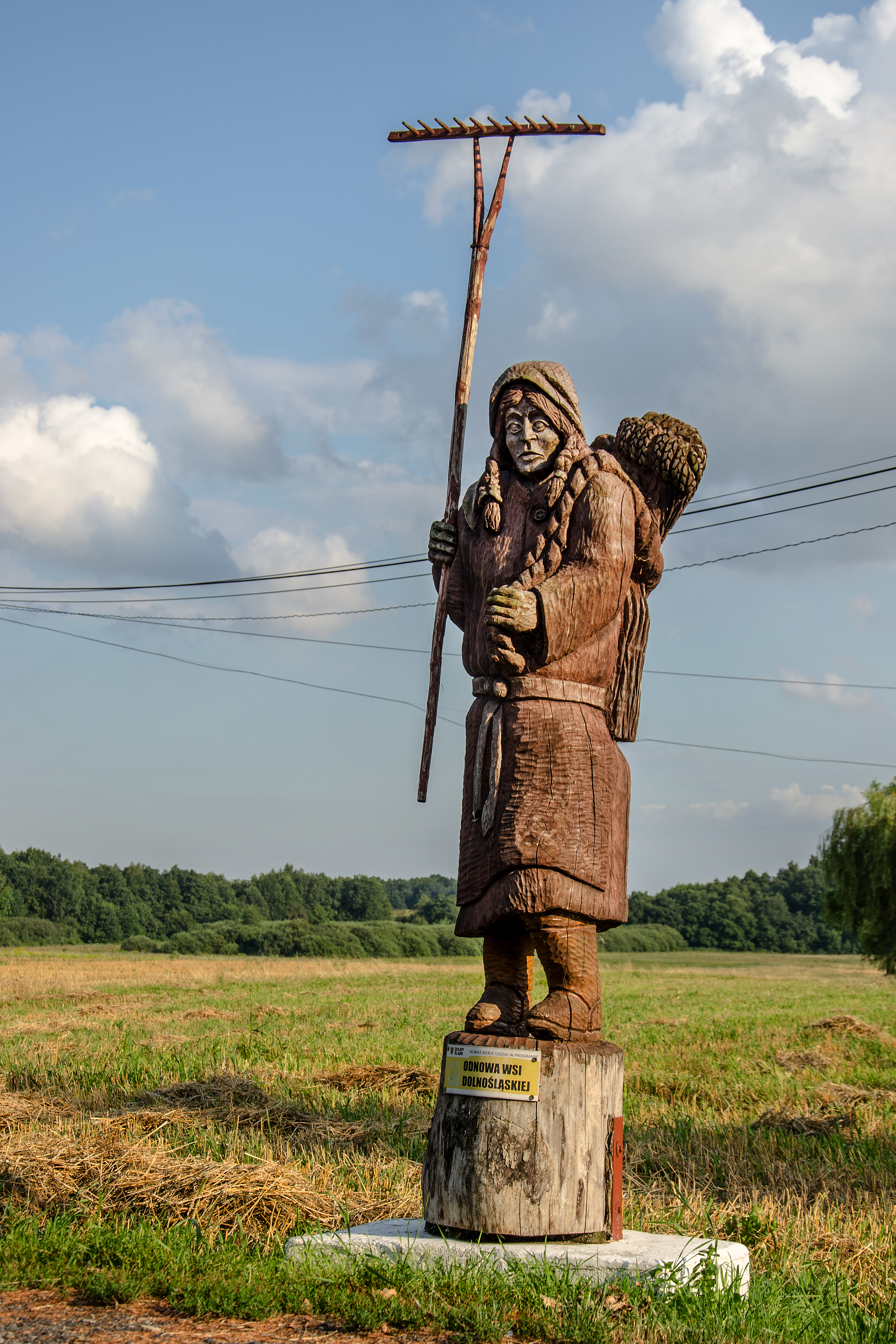

- Location within Poland
- Coordinates: 51°17′27″N 16°08′06″E
- Country: Poland
- Voivodeship: Lower Silesian
- County: Legnica
- Gmina: Miłkowice

Głuchowice [ɡwuxɔˈvit͡sɛ] is a village in the administrative district of Gmina Miłkowice, within Legnica County, Lower Silesian Voivodeship, in south-western Poland.
