= Jakuszów =

- Village
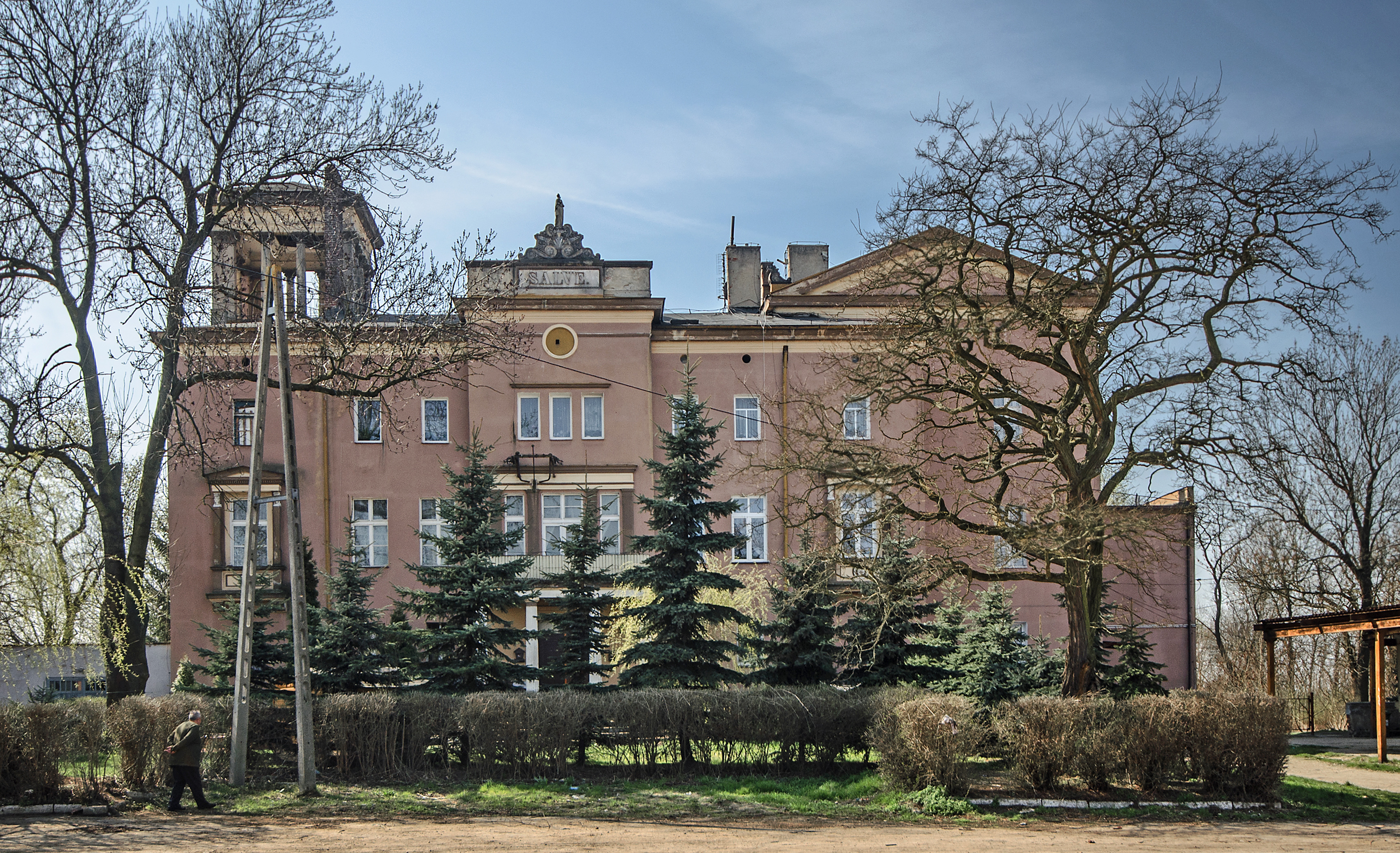
- Palace in Jakuszów

- Location within Poland
- Coordinates: 51°14′36″N 16°07′03″E
- Country: Poland
- Voivodeship: Lower Silesian
- County: Legnica
- Gmina: Miłkowice
- Website: http://www.tatarak.legnica.pl

Jakuszów [jaˈkuʂuf] (German: Jakobsdorf bei Liegnitz) is a village in the administrative district of Gmina Miłkowice, within Legnica County, Lower Silesian Voivodeship, in south-western Poland.
