= Borki Sokolskie =

- Village
- Location within Poland
- Coordinates: 51°19′39″N 18°21′52″E
- Country: Poland
- Voivodeship: Łódź
- County: Wieruszów
- Gmina: Sokolniki
- Population: 70

Borki Sokolskie [ˈbɔrki sɔˈkɔlskʲɛ] is a village in the administrative district of Gmina Sokolniki, within Wieruszów County, Łódź Voivodeship, in central Poland.
