= Studnica, Lower Silesian Voivodeship =

Studnica
- Village
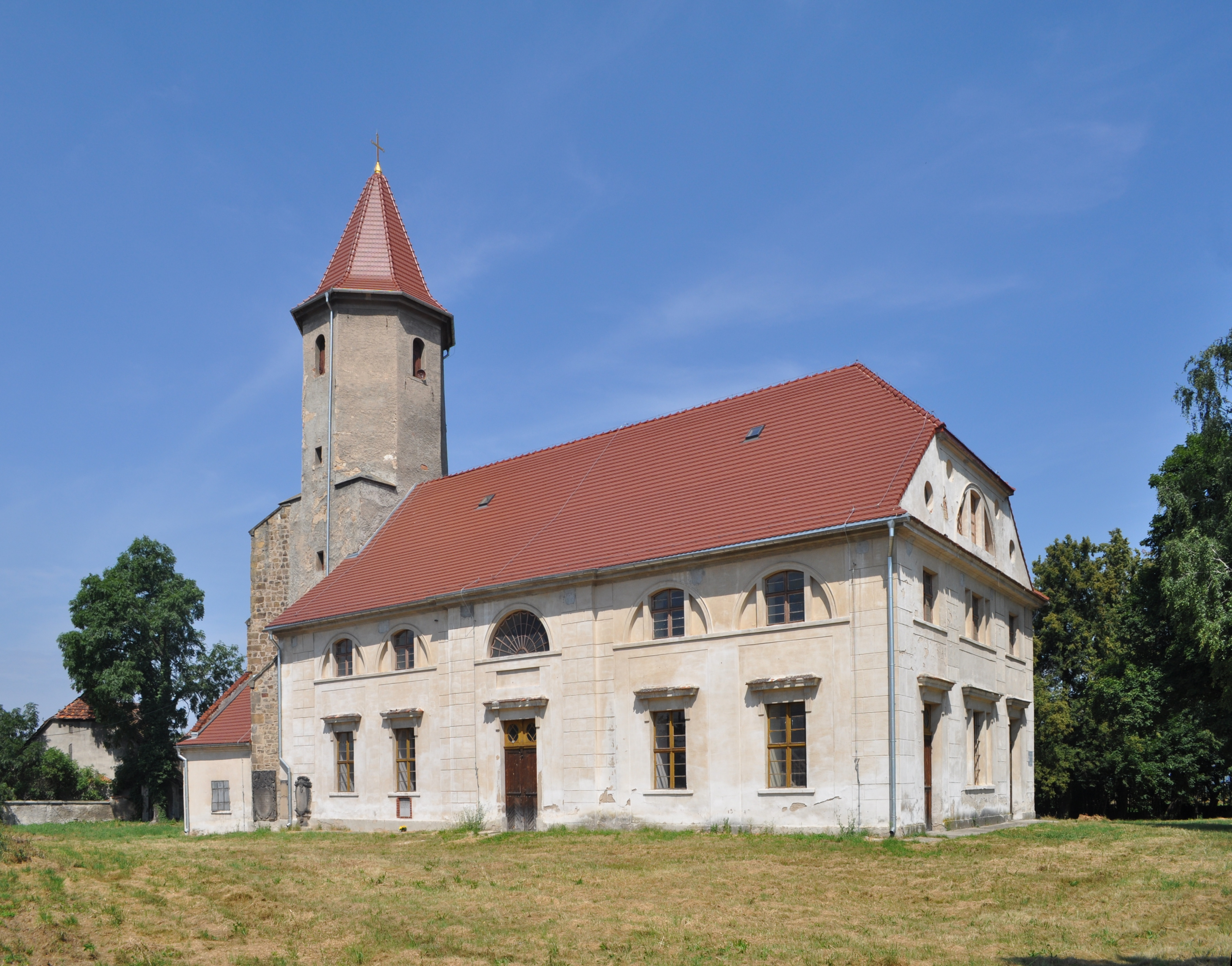
- Church in Studnica

- Location within Poland
- Coordinates: 51°14′29″N 16°01′27″E
- Country: Poland
- Voivodeship: Lower Silesian
- County: Legnica
- Gmina: Miłkowice

Studnica [studˈnit͡sa] is a village in the administrative district of Gmina Miłkowice, within Legnica County, Lower Silesian Voivodeship, in south-western Poland.
