= Maksymów, Wieruszów County =

Maksymów
- Village
- Location within Poland
- Coordinates: 51°17′18″N 18°22′57″E
- Country: Poland
- Voivodeship: Łódź
- County: Wieruszów
- Gmina: Sokolniki

Maksymów [makˈsɨmuf] is a village in the administrative district of Gmina Sokolniki, within Wieruszów County, Łódź Voivodeship, in central Poland.
