= Walichnowy =

- Village
- Location within Poland
- Coordinates: 51°18′N 18°23′E
- Country: Poland
- Voivodeship: Łódź
- County: Wieruszów
- Gmina: Sokolniki
- Population: 1,100

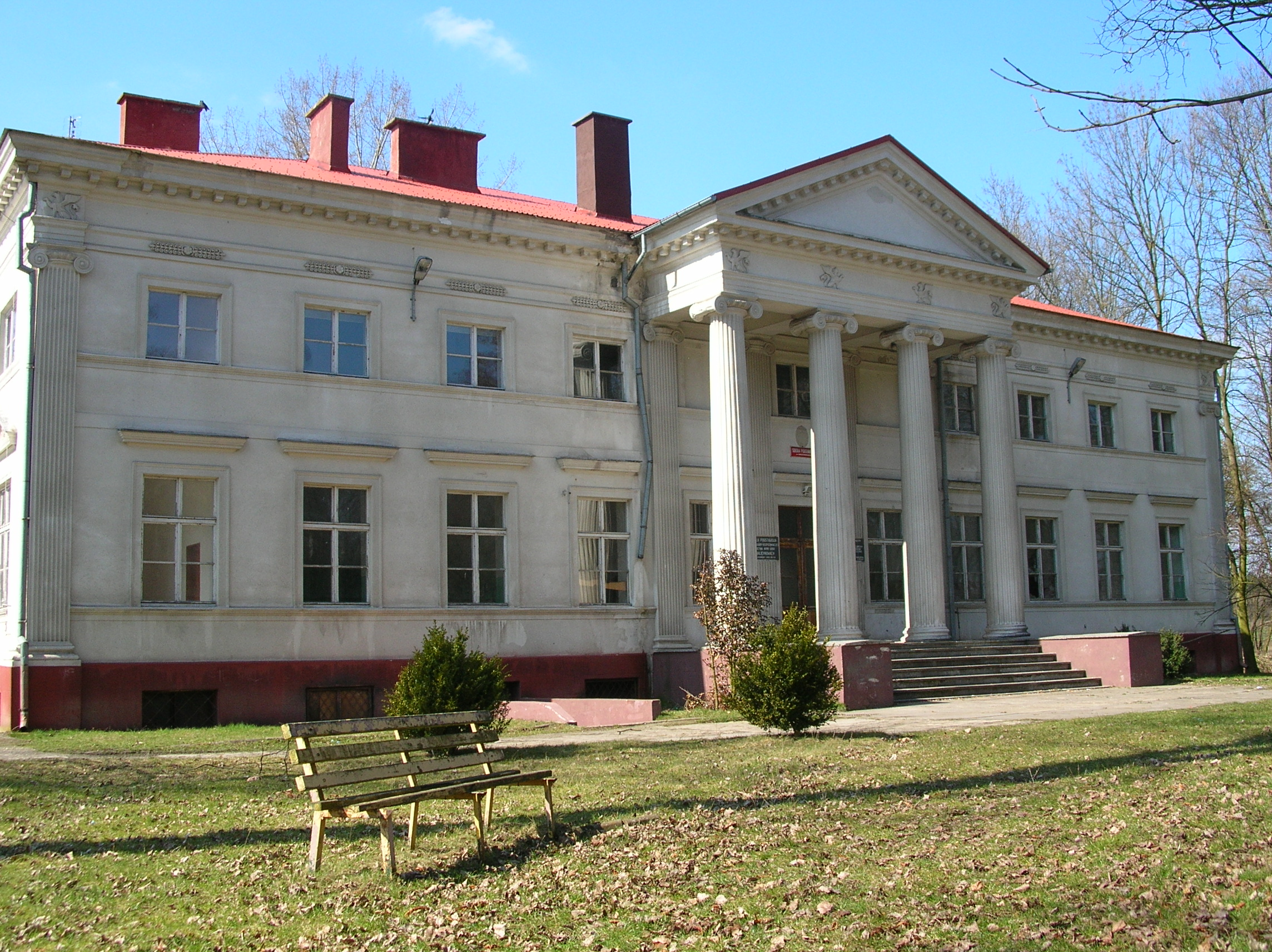
Palace in Walichnowy

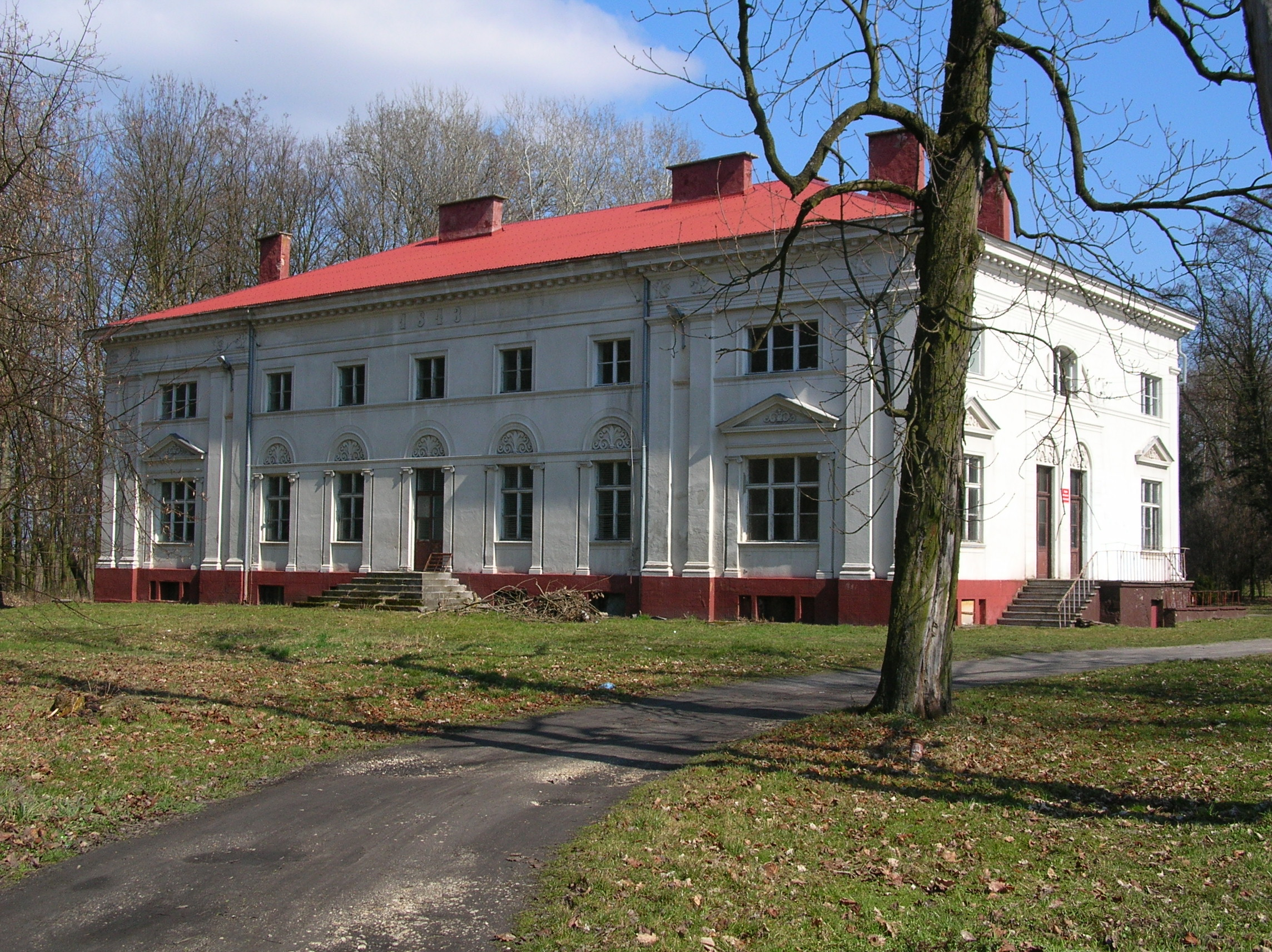
Palace in Walichnowy

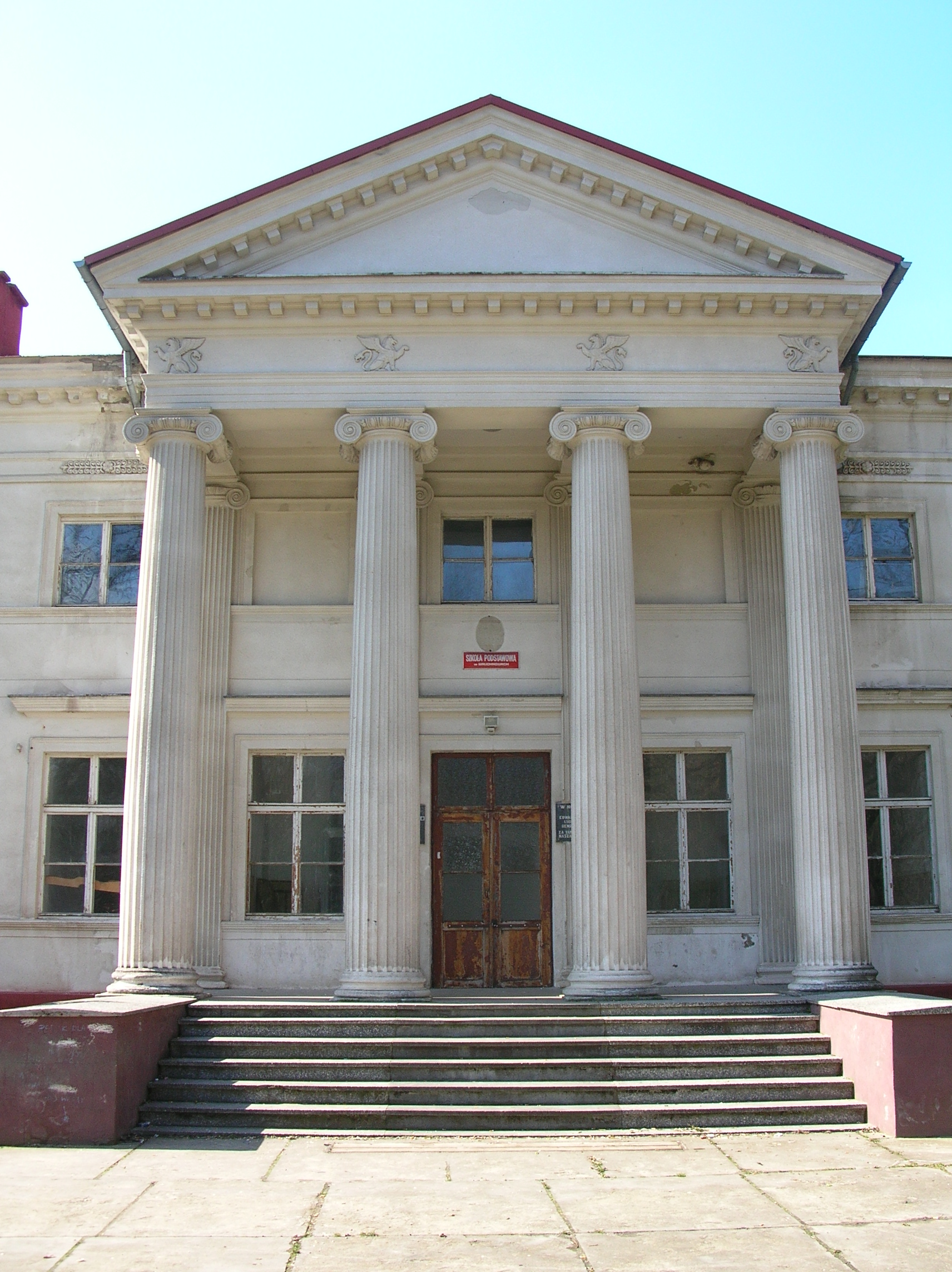
Palace in Walichnowy

Walichnowy [valixˈnɔvɨ] is a village in the administrative district of Gmina Sokolniki, within Wieruszów County, Łódź Voivodeship, in central Poland.
