= Malanów, Wieruszów County =

Malanów
- Village
- Location within Poland
- Coordinates: 51°16′49″N 18°23′59″E
- Country: Poland
- Voivodeship: Łódź
- County: Wieruszów
- Gmina: Sokolniki

Malanów [maˈlanuf] is a village in the administrative district of Gmina Sokolniki, within Wieruszów County, Łódź Voivodeship, in central Poland.
