= Brzana Górna =

- Village
- Location within Poland
- Coordinates: 49°43′38″N 20°54′34″E
- Country: Poland
- Voivodeship: Lesser Poland
- County: Gorlice
- Gmina: Bobowa
- Population: 600

Brzana Górna [ˈbʐana ˈɡurna] is a village in the administrative district of Gmina Bobowa, within Gorlice County, Lesser Poland Voivodeship, in southern Poland.

The name Brzana Górna means "Upper Brzana". The village and Brzana Dolna ("Lower Brzana") make up a single administrative unit (sołectwo) called Brzana.
