= Lipce, Lower Silesian Voivodeship =

Lipce
- Village
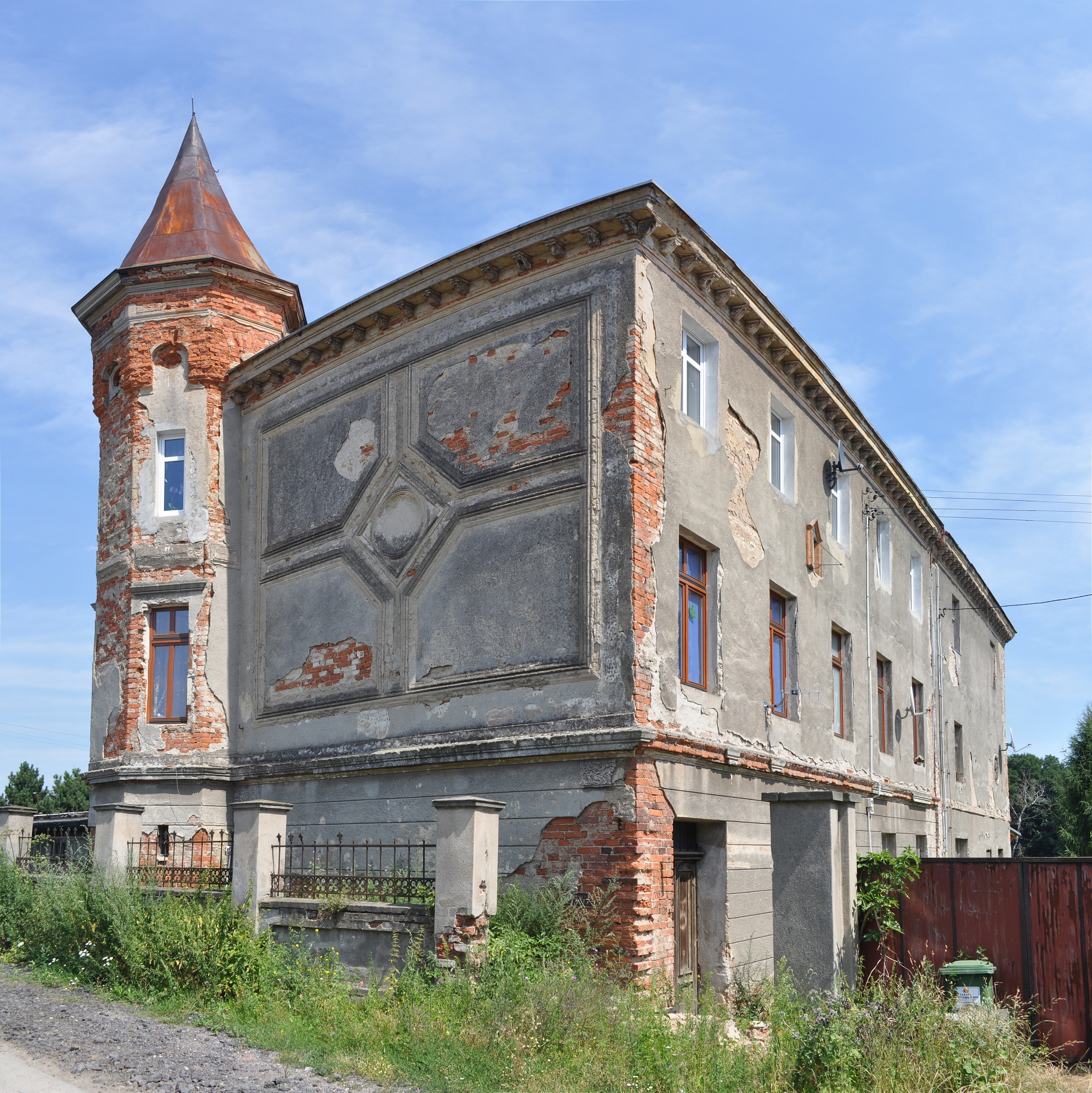
- Building in Lipce

- Location within Poland
- Coordinates: 51°12′45″N 16°06′30″E
- Country: Poland
- Voivodeship: Lower Silesian
- County: Legnica
- Gmina: Miłkowice

Lipce [ˈlipt͡sɛ] is a village in the administrative district of Gmina Miłkowice, within Legnica County, Lower Silesian Voivodeship, in southwestern Poland.
