= Ulesie, Lower Silesian Voivodeship =

Ulesie
- Village
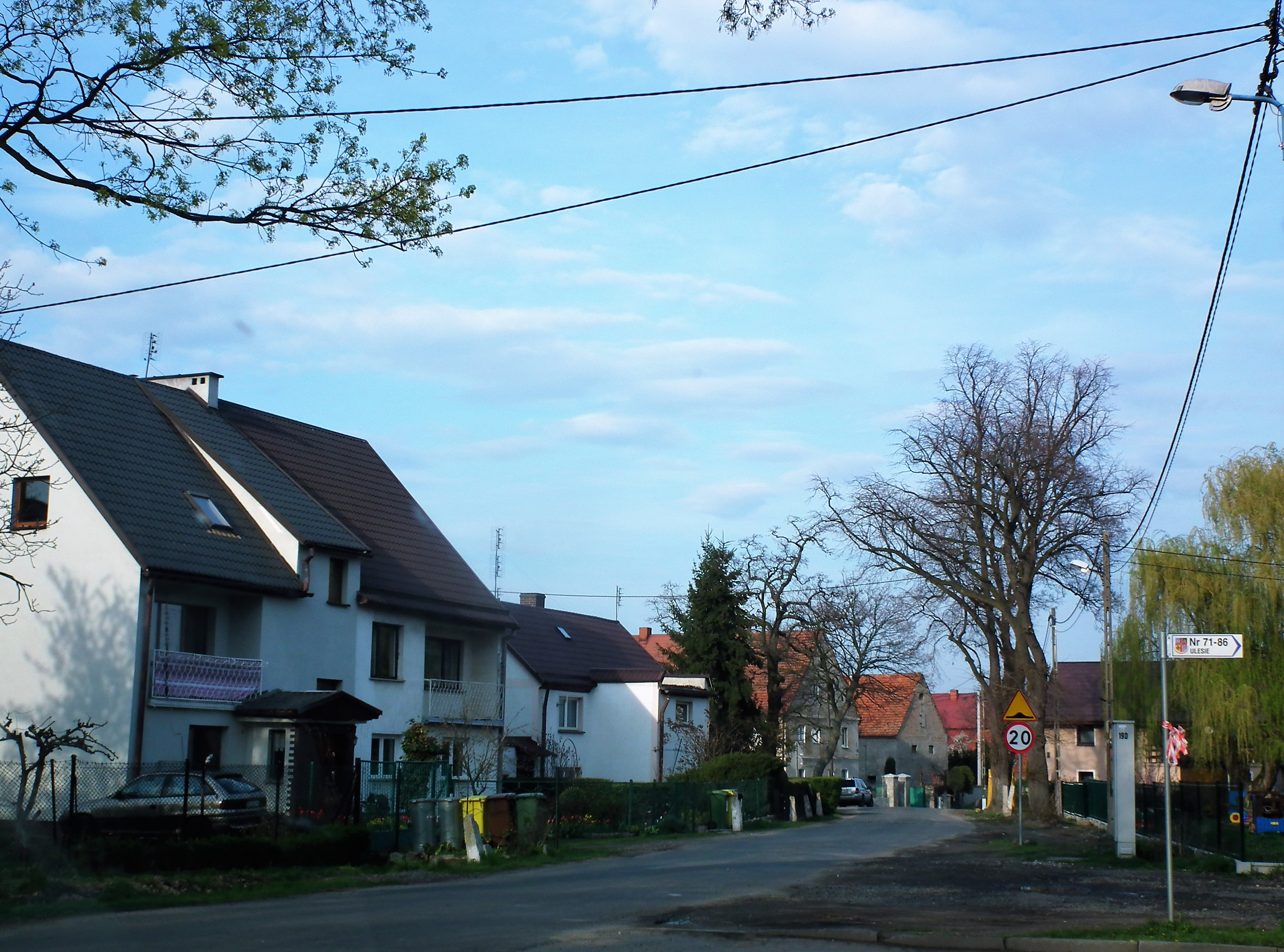

- Location within Poland
- Coordinates: 51°13′18″N 16°06′31″E
- Country: Poland
- Voivodeship: Lower Silesian
- County: Legnica
- Gmina: Miłkowice

Population
  - Total: 590

Ulesie [uˈlɛɕɛ] is a village in the administrative district of Gmina Miłkowice, within Legnica County, Lower Silesian Voivodeship, in south-western Poland.
