= Gmina Miłkowice =

Gmina Miłkowice Miłkowice Commune
- Gmina
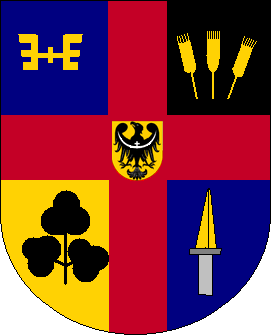
- Coat of arms

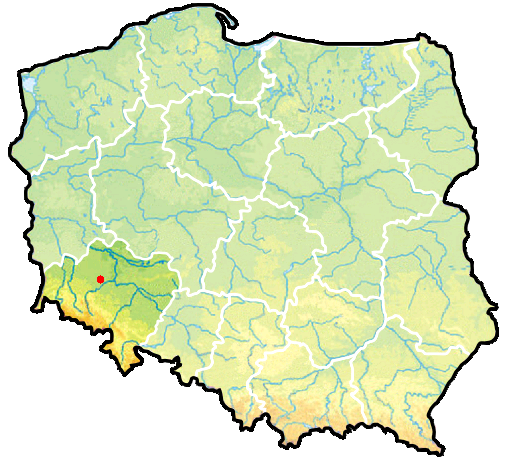
- Coordinates (Miłkowice): 51°15′27″N 16°3′24″E
- Country: Poland
- Voivodeship: Lower Silesian
- County: Legnica
- Seat: Miłkowice
- Sołectwos: Bobrów, Głuchowice, Gniewomirowice, Goślinów, Grzymalin, Jakuszów, Jezierzany, Kochlice, Lipce, Miłkowice, Pątnówek, Rzeszotary-Dobrzejów, Siedliska, Studnica, Ulesie

Area
  - Total: 86.37 km^{2} (33.35 sq mi)

Population (2019-06-30)
  - Total: 6,721
  - Density: 77.82/km^{2} (201.5/sq mi)
- Website: http://www.ugmilkowice.net/

Gmina Miłkowice is a rural gmina (administrative district) in Legnica County, Lower Silesian Voivodeship, in south-western Poland. Its seat is the village of Miłkowice, which is approximately 9 kilometres (6 mi) north-west of Legnica, and 71 kilometres (44 mi) west of the regional capital Wrocław.

The gmina covers an area of 86.37 square kilometres (33.3 sq mi) and, in 2019, its total population was 6,721.

== Neighbouring gminas ==
Gmina Miłkowice is bordered by the town of Legnica and the gminas of Chojnów, Krotoszyce, Kunice, Lubin and Złotoryja.

== Villages ==
The gmina contains the villages of Bobrów, Dobrzejów, Głuchowice, Gniewomirowice, Goślinów, Grzymalin, Jakuszów, Jezierzany, Kochlice, Lipce, Miłkowice, Pątnówek, Rzeszotary, Siedliska, Studnica and Ulesie.
