= Sędziszowa, Lesser Poland Voivodeship =

Sędziszowa
- Village
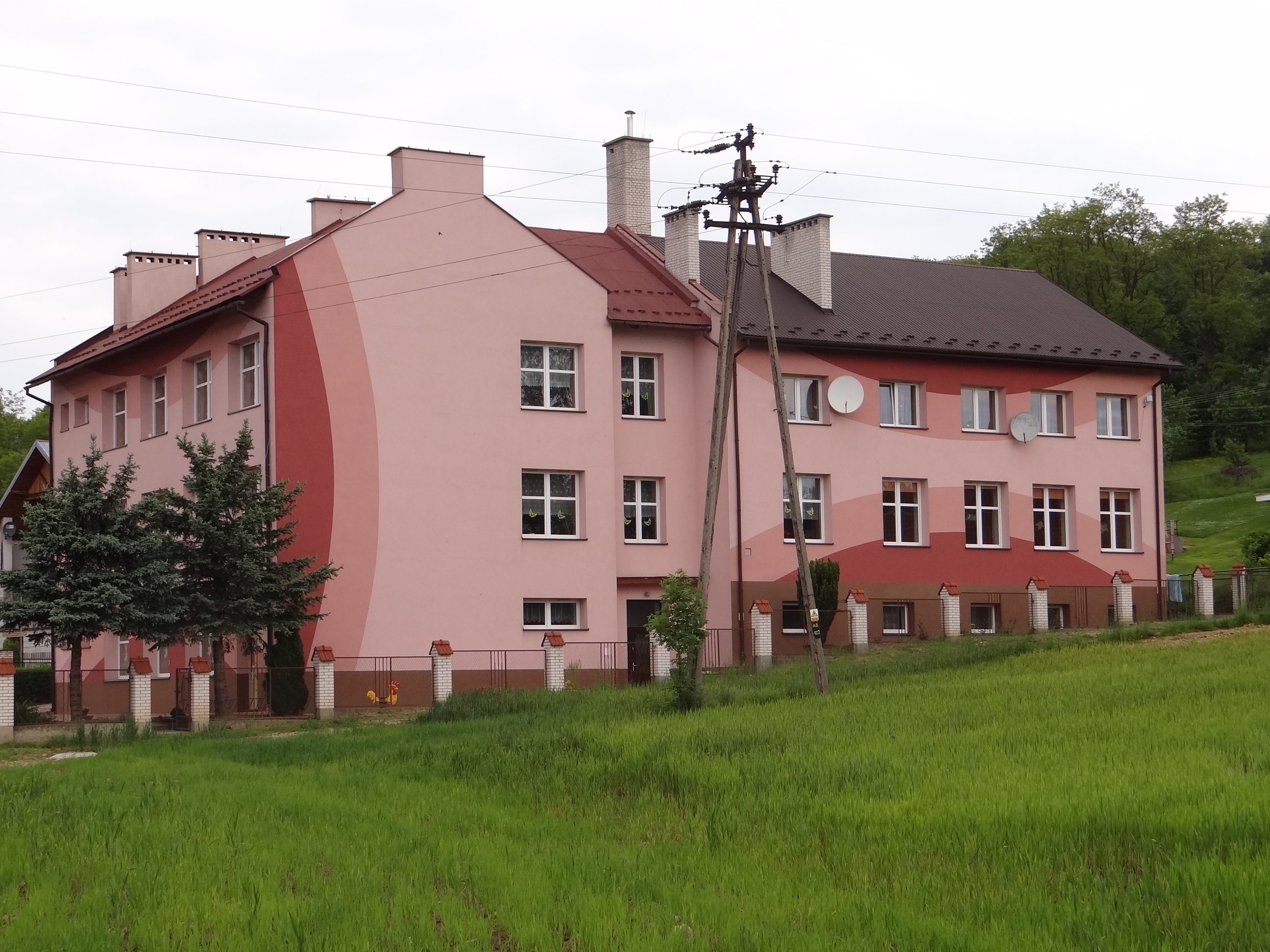
- School

- Location within Poland
- Coordinates: 49°44′N 20°58′E
- Country: Poland
- Voivodeship: Lesser Poland
- County: Gorlice
- Gmina: Bobowa

Sędziszowa [sɛnd͡ʑiˈʂɔva] is a village in the administrative district of Gmina Bobowa, within Gorlice County, Lesser Poland Voivodeship, in southern Poland.
