= Siedliska, Łódź Voivodeship =

Siedliska
- Village
- Location within Poland
- Coordinates: 51°20′16″N 18°24′6″E
- Country: Poland
- Voivodeship: Łódź
- County: Wieruszów
- Gmina: Sokolniki
- Population: 180

Siedliska [ɕɛdˈlʲiska] is a village in the administrative district of Gmina Sokolniki, within Wieruszów County, Łódź Voivodeship, in central Poland.
