= Jankowa, Lesser Poland Voivodeship =

Jankowa
- Village
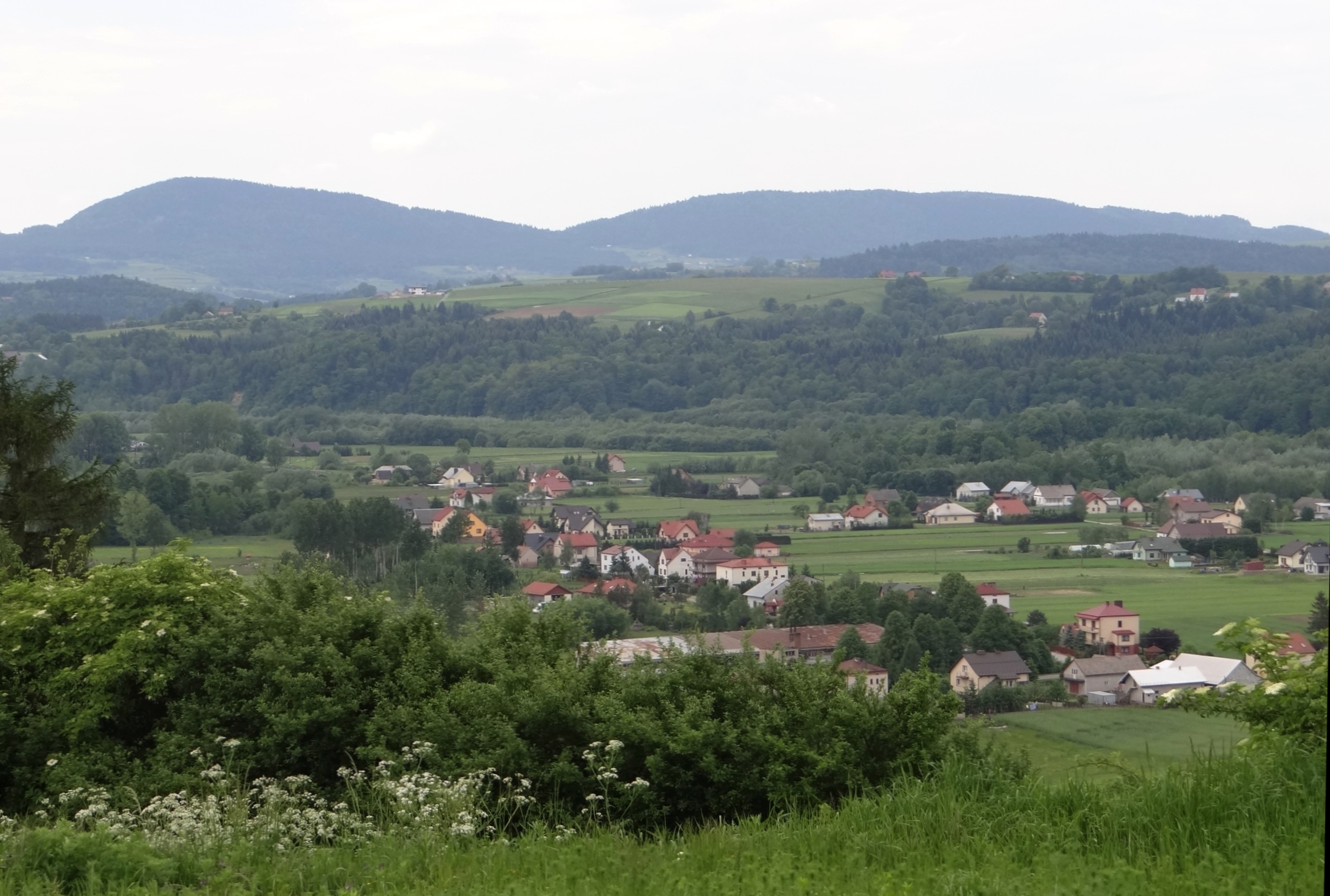

- Location within Poland
- Coordinates: 49°42′7″N 20°54′14″E
- Country: Poland
- Voivodeship: Lesser Poland
- County: Gorlice
- Gmina: Bobowa
- Population: 940

Jankowa [janˈkɔva] is a village in the administrative district of Gmina Bobowa, within Gorlice County, Lesser Poland Voivodeship, in southern Poland.
