= Siedliska, Gorlice County =

Siedliska
- Village
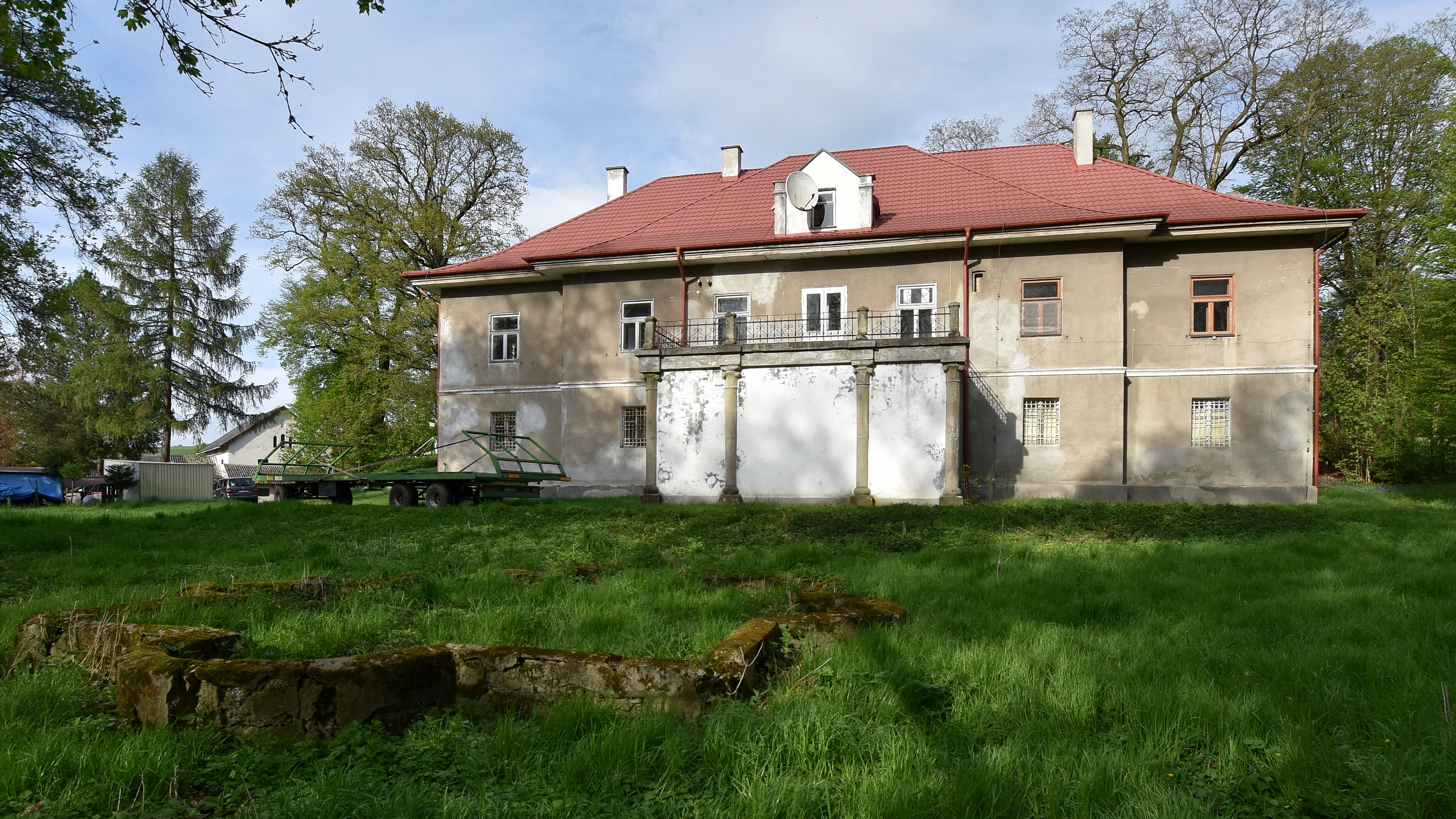
- Manor house

- Location within Poland
- Coordinates: 49°43′42″N 20°58′54″E
- Country: Poland
- Voivodeship: Lesser Poland
- County: Gorlice
- Gmina: Bobowa
- Population: 2,000

Siedliska [ɕɛdˈlʲiska] is a village in the administrative district of Gmina Bobowa, within Gorlice County, Lesser Poland Voivodeship, in southern Poland.
