= Siedliska, Lower Silesian Voivodeship =

Siedliska
- Village
- Location within Poland
- Coordinates: 51°15′N 16°2′E
- Country: Poland
- Voivodeship: Lower Silesian
- County: Legnica
- Gmina: Miłkowice

Siedliska [ɕɛdˈlʲiska] is a village in the administrative district of Gmina Miłkowice, within Legnica County, Lower Silesian Voivodeship, in south-western Poland.
