= Bobrów, Legnica County =

Bobrów
- Village
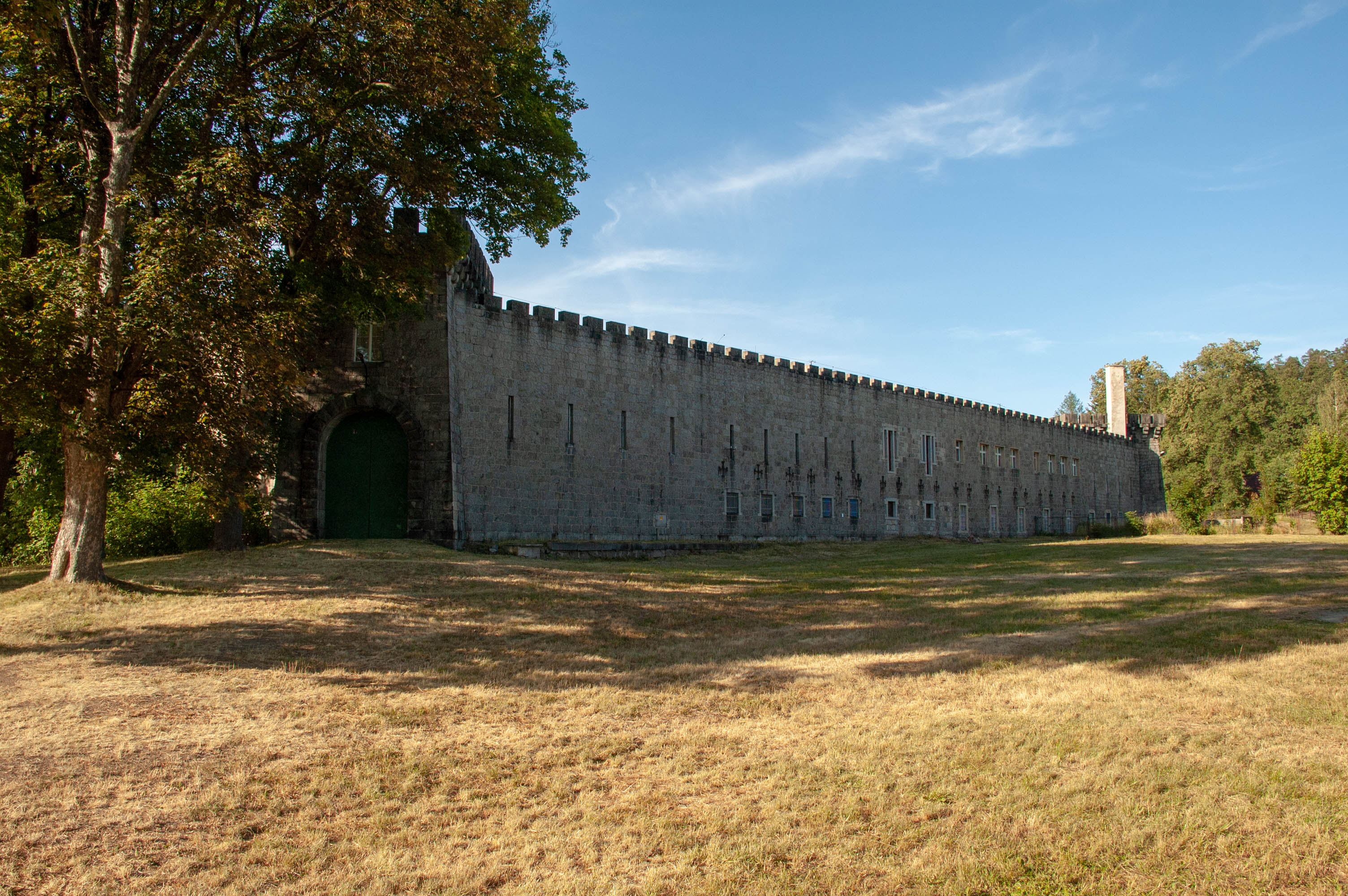
- Wall of a castle

- Location within Poland
- Coordinates: 51°14′05″N 16°08′18″E
- Country: Poland
- Voivodeship: Lower Silesian
- County: Legnica
- Gmina: Miłkowice

Bobrów is a village in the administrative district of Gmina Miłkowice, within Legnica County, Lower Silesian Voivodeship, in south-western Poland.

== Gallery ==
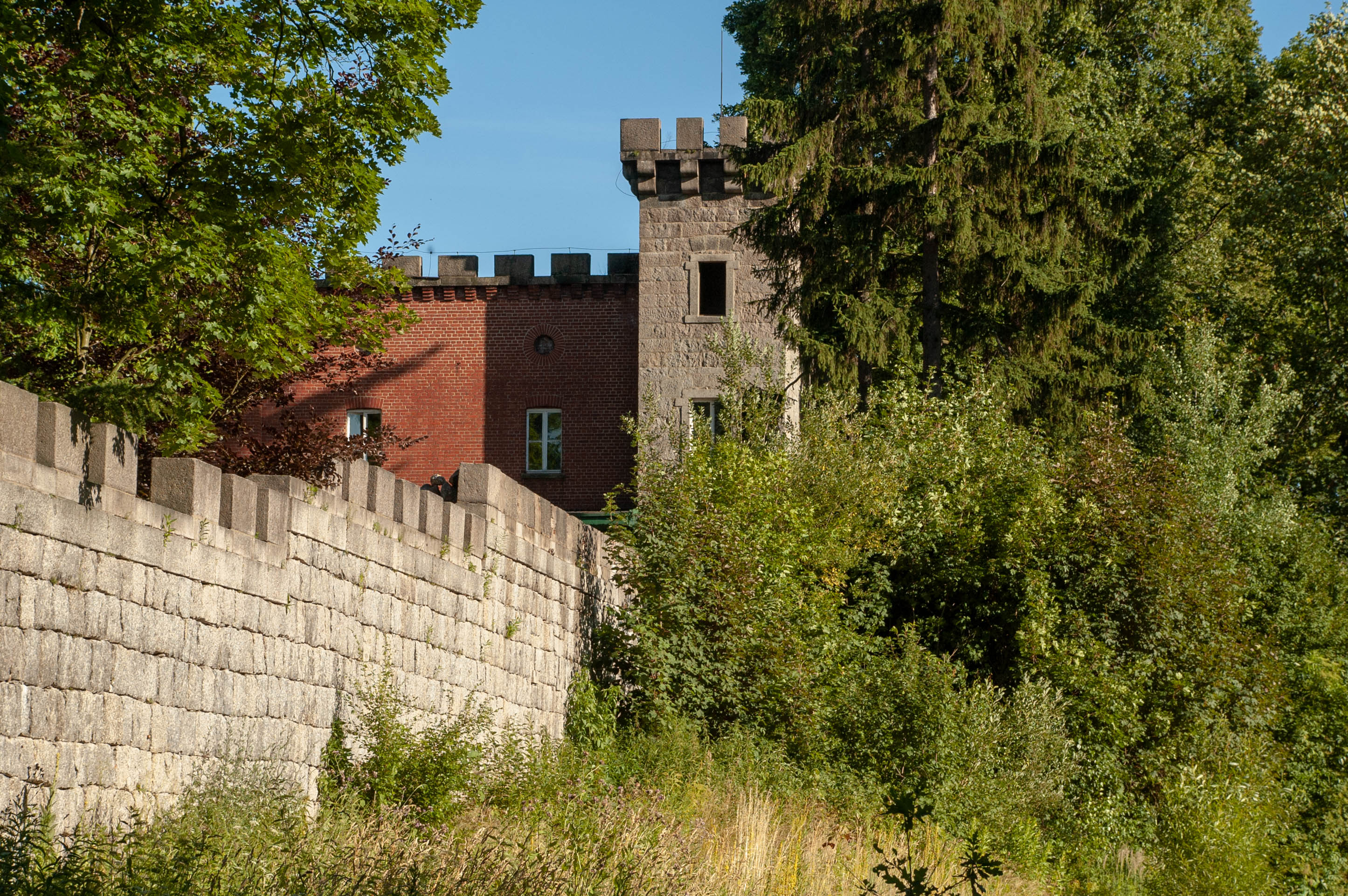
Part of the castle

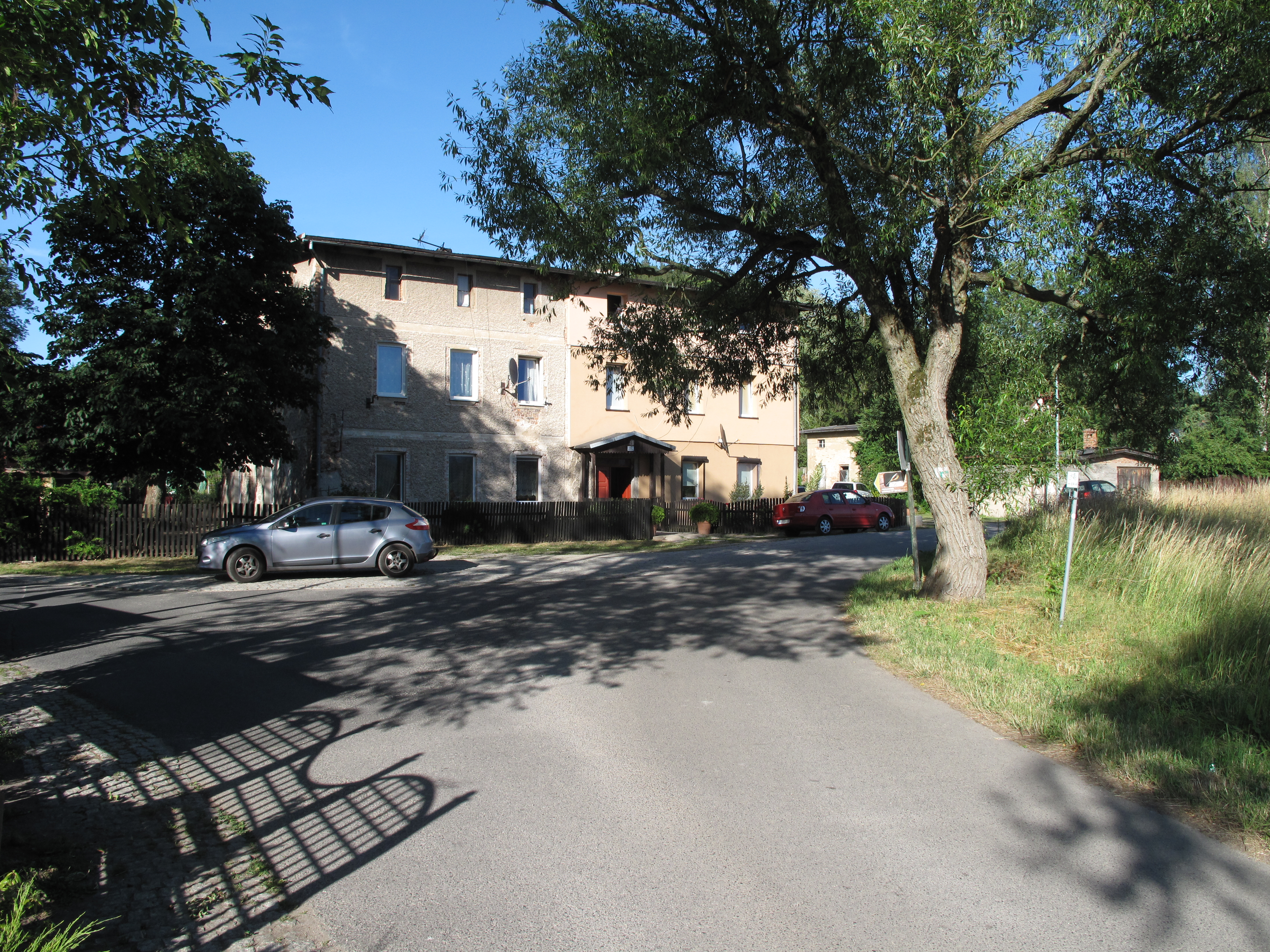
House

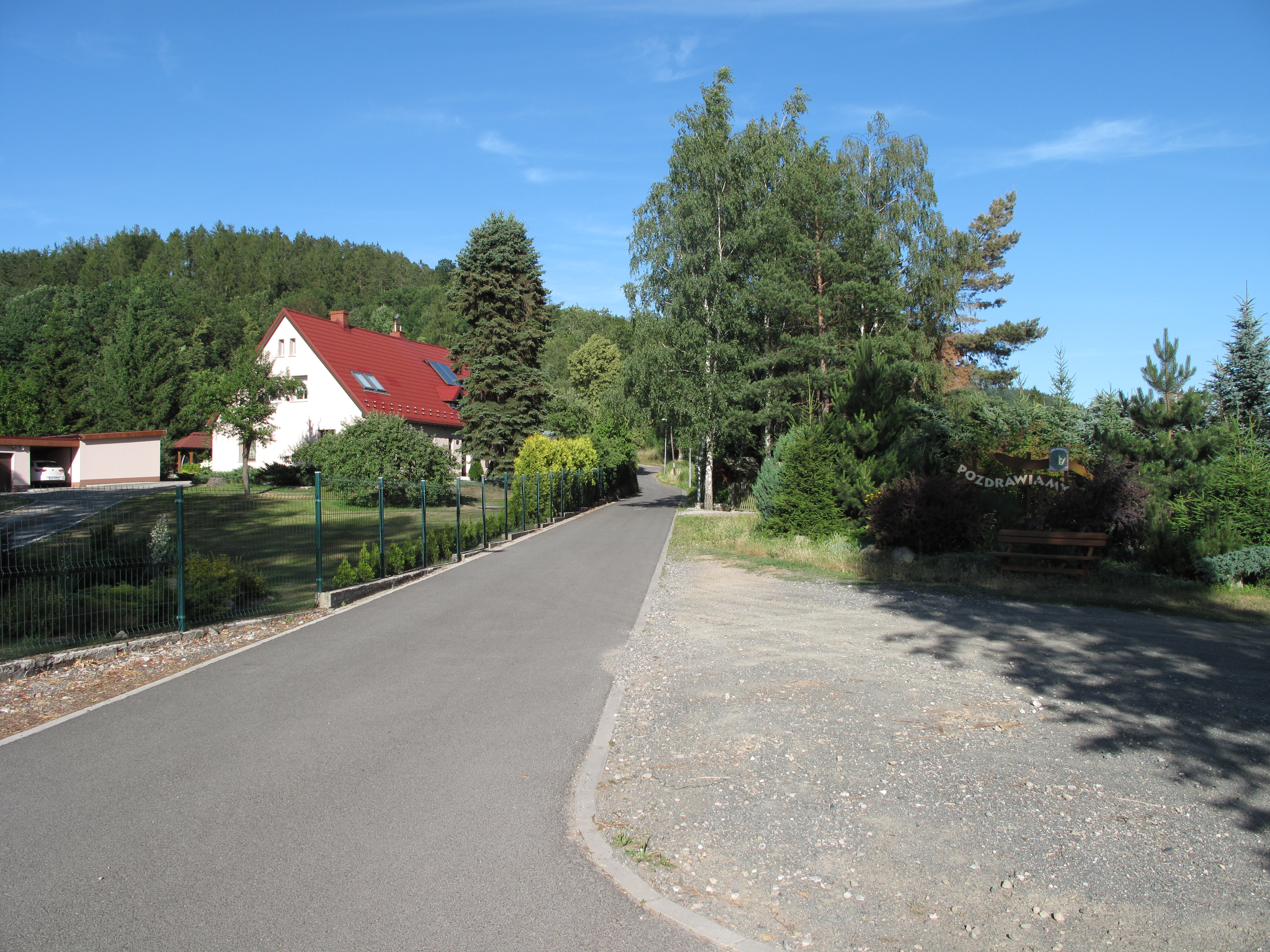
Street with a house
