= Kiedrzynski family with Ostoja coat of arms =

Polish noble family

Polish medieval CoA Ostoja

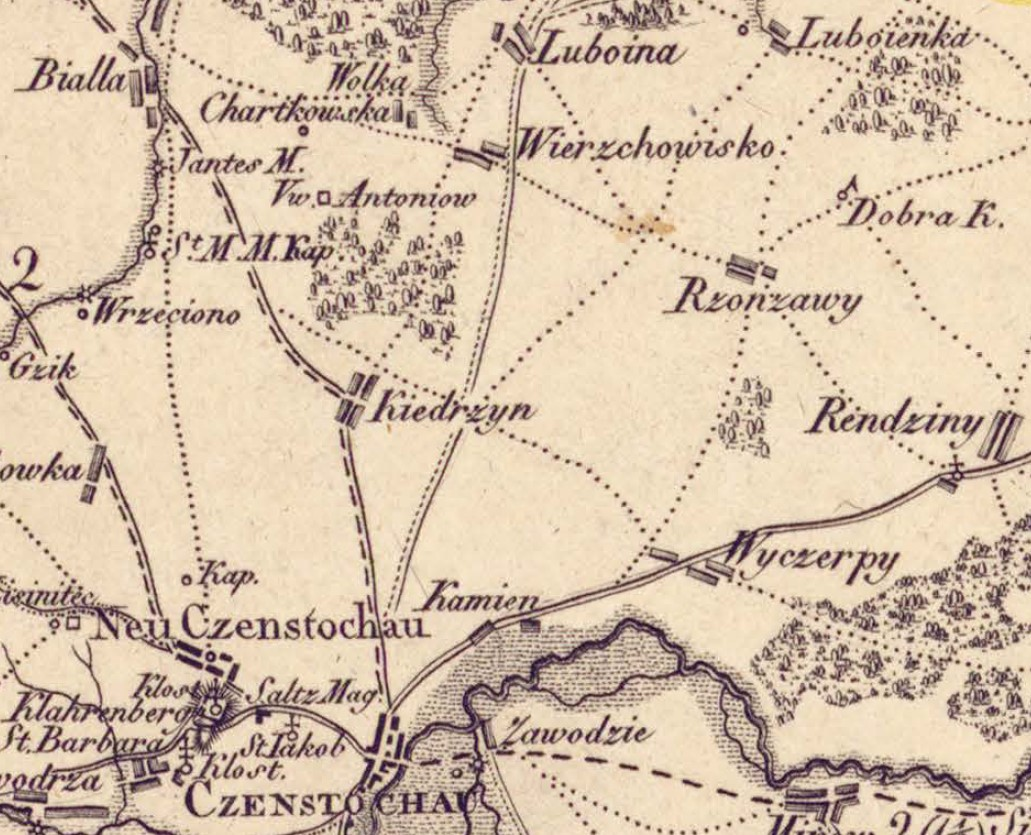
Kiedrzyn and Wierzchowisko on the map of South Prussia by David von Gilly from 1802 to 1803.

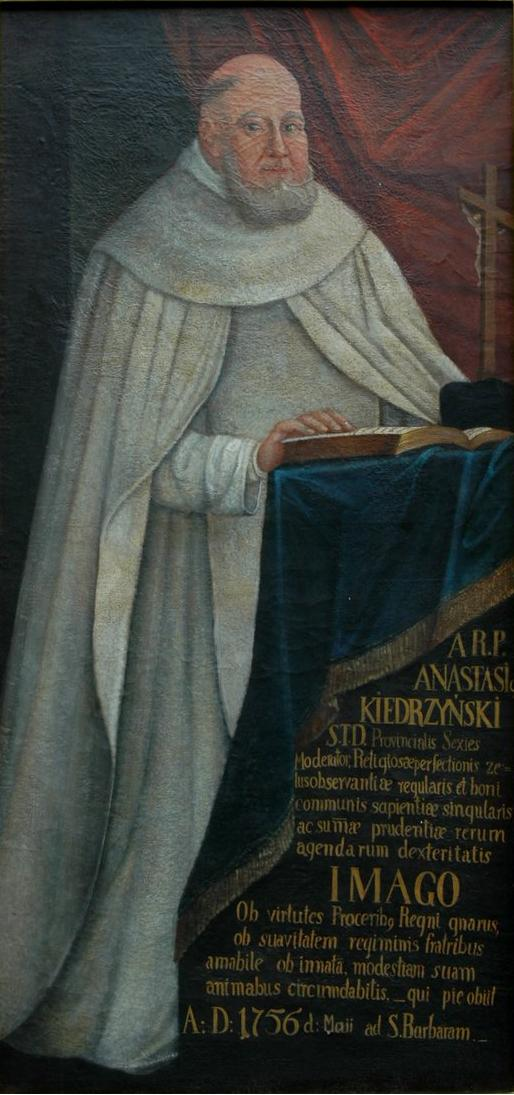
Father Anastazy Kiedrzyński, Polish provincial of the Pauline Order, prior of the Jasna Góra Monastery.

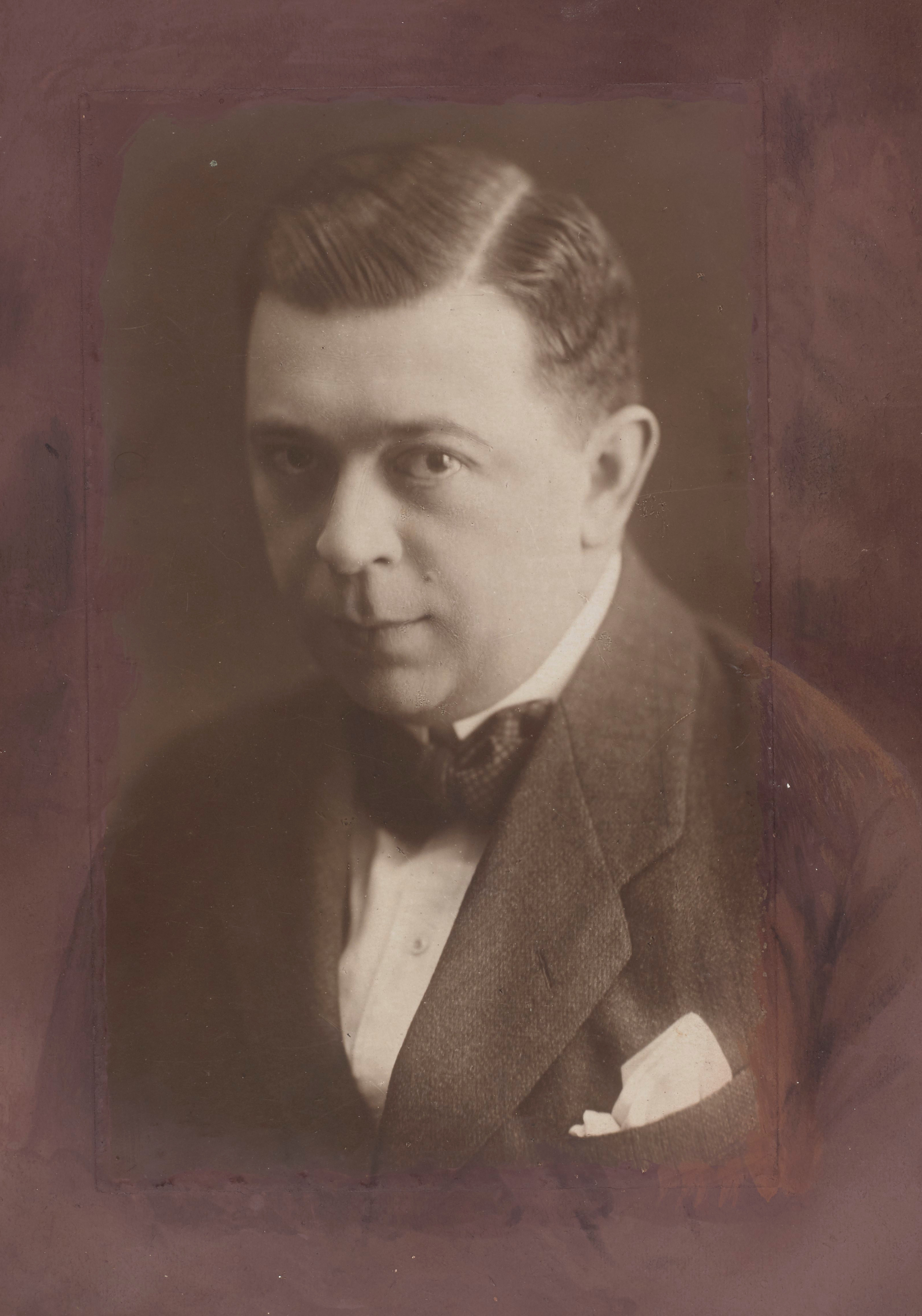
Stefan Kiedrzyński, playwright and novelist

The Kiedrzynski family is a Polish noble family with the Ostoja coat of arms, belonging to the heraldic Clan Ostoja (Moscics), originating from Kiedrzyn (now a district of Częstochowa). Kiedrzyński was mentioned by Kasper Niesiecki in Herbarz Polski.

== The oldest source certificates concerning the family ==
Listed below are selected source certificates concerning the Kiedrzynski of the Ostoja CoA and the village of Kiedrzyn until the mid-16th century.

- The oldest mention of Kiedrzyn comes from the period when the village was a royal property, located in a noble tenure. In 1398 the tenant of Kiedrzyn was Pietrasz Stroszocic (Stroszoczicz, son of Strasz). Kiedrzyn Jan Długosz recorded as a royal village in Liber beneficiorum dioecesis Cracoviensis.
- The first known representative of the Ostoja family who was a tenant of Kiedrzyn was Mikołaj Biel from Błeszno, son of Abel Biel, appearing in the sources in the years 1424-1428, who did not leave any male descendants, like other descendants of Abel Biel. The tenuta of Kiedrzyn after Biel in 1432 was held by Mikołaj of Pierzchno of the Ostoja coat of arms.
- In 1468, Jan Koziegłowski of the Lis coat of arms, tenant of Kiedrzyn, pledged the village for 100 Hungarian florins and 10 fines to Jakub of Wierzchowisko (probably of the Ostoja coat of arms) for a period of 1 year until full redemption. Jakub from Wierzchowiska, this year, bequeathed 40 fines to his wife Katarzyna for a dowry on hereditary property in Kiedrzyn. After 1475, the brothers Jakub from Kiedrzyn, Mikołaj from Kiedrzyn and their sister Katarzyna (wife of Piotr from Golanki), children of Jakub from Kiedrzyn, appeared in Kiedrzyn.
- In 1480, Mikołaj of Kiedrzyn bequeathed his wife Dorota, the daughter of Tomasz Czaskowski (Czaszkowski), a dowry of 30 pennies and the same dowry on half of all hereditary properties - Kiedrzyn and Wierzchowisko.
- In 1504 Małgorzata Kiedrzyńska of the Ostoja coat of arms received 10 fines from king Aleksander Jagiellończyk.
- In the years 1522-1539, Mikołaj Kiedrzyński of the Ostoja coat of arms appeared in the sources, the heir of Kiedrzyn, husband of Zuzanna.
- In 1544, King Zygmunt Stary allowed Feliks Błeszczyński to buy the village of Kiedrzyn from the hands of Zuzanna, the widow of Mikołaj Kiedrzyński and his children: Marcin (Marian), Piotr, Szymon, Sebastian, Elżbieta, Barbara and Zofia.
- In 1547, Zygmunt Stary allowed Gabriel Zaborowski to buy the village of Kiedrzyn from his brothers Marian, Piotr, Sebastian and Szymon Kiedrzyński and gave him the village for life.
- In the years 1549-51, Marian and Piotr Kiedrzyński from Kiedrzyn and Wola Wierzchowska (today Wola Kiedrzyńska) sued Wojciech, provincial of the Częstochowa monastery, for not returning Kiedrzyński's peasant Maciej Kępa, who had escaped from Kiedrzyn to Szarlejka.

== The estates belonging to the family ==
Listed below are the most important lands belonging to the Kiedrzynski family with Ostoja coat of arms.

Kiedrzyn, Wierzchowisko, Wola Wierzchowska (dziś Wola Kiedrzyńska), Kurów, Kamyk, Dymki, folwark Kamionki, Orpiszewek, Fabianów, Bieganin, Kaczki Średnie, Kunowo, Małęczyn,

== Family representatives ==
- Jan Kiedrzyński (1609-1672) - Catholic priest, Jesuit, missionary in Turów (1653-1654), chaplain near Chocim. He came from Greater Poland. He died on July 13, 1672, in Brest-Litovsk.
- Jan Jakub Kiedrzyński (died before 1729) - owner of Kurów, Wieluń s court. He was the son of Stanisław and Elżbieta née Skorzewska. His spouse was Anna Gomolińska. In 1698 he bought from Sebastian Gawroński the village of Dymki and the Kamionki farm.
- Anastazy Kiedrzyński, actually Piotr Kiedrzyński (1676-1756) - Catholic priest, friar of OSPPE, priest, doctor of theology, provincial of the Order of Saint Paul the First Hermit, prior of the Wieluń monastery, at Jasna Góra (1716-1719) and at Skałka in Kraków (1722–1722 1728). He was the son of Ludwik and Zofia Kiedrzyński.
- Andrzej Kiedrzyński (died before 1769) - owner of the Bieganin estate. He was the son of Kazimierz and Katarzyna Swierczkowska. His spouse was Franciszka Jackowska, daughter of Jan, head of Kroswicki and Teresa Załuskowska.
- Joachim Kiedrzyński (died 1787) - Catholic priest, friar of OSPPE (Pauline). He was the brother of Father Celestyn Kiedrzyński, a Cistercian.
- Ludwik Kiedrzyński (died after 1789) - the leaseholder of the Sekursko estate, burgrave of Piotrkowski. He was the husband of Róża née Błeszyński.
- Florian Kiedrzyński (died after 1791) - owner of the Kaczki Średnie estate, land burgrave of Zakroczym, commissioner of the Kalisz voivodeship. He was the son of Andrzej and Franciszka née Jackowski, owners of the Bieganin estate. His spouse was Barbara Mikołajewska, daughter of Antoni and Katarzyna Żurawska.
- Jan Kiedrzyński (died 1793) - Catholic priest, canon of the collegiate chapter of St. George in Gniezno, the penitentiary archcathedral of Gniezno, the parish priest of Września and the parish priest of Marzeniński.
- Jakub Kiedrzyński (died 1798) - owner of the Orpiszewek and Fabianów estates, burgrave of Kalisz, land judge of Kalisz. He was the son of Andrzej and Franciszka Jackowska. He got married twice - 1st with Brygida Bardzka and 2nd with Juljanna Bogdańska.
- Łukasz Kiedrzyński (died 1802) - heir of the Kunowo estate. He was the son of Jan Kiedrzyński and Ludwika née Sieliński (part of the Sielnicki and Silnicki families). His spouse was Franciszka Raczyńska.
- Celestyn Kiedrzyński (1734-1818) - Catholic priest, friar of the OCSO (Cistercians) of the Bledzewo monastery, presbyter, professor, pastor of Bledzew. He entered the convent around 1757. When a new church was erected in Bledzewo in 1780, he was the prior of the monastery. He was the son of Jan Kiedrzyński and Ludwika née Sieliński (part of the Sielnicki and Silnicki families).
- Wincenty Kiedrzyński (died 1839) - the heir of Małęczyn. He was buried in Radom.
- Stefan Kiedrzyński (1886-1943) - Polish playwright and novelist. He graduated from the Academy of Fine Arts in Warsaw. He was a regular collaborator of Kurier Warszawski. He created comedies, satires, farces, social and sensational novels, as well as film scripts. He was the son of Bolesław Kiedrzyński, an official of the Vienna Iron Road, and Julia Amalia from Dolne.
- Roman Kiedrzyński, pseudonym Ryszard (1906-1970) - Warsaw insurgent, second lieutenant. He used the surname of the underground Stanisław Cieszkowski. He fought in the ranks of the Home Army ("Zaremba" - "Piorun" battalion - 2nd company). He passed the combat trail: Śródmieście Południe. After the uprising he was taken prisoner by the Germans.
- Zdzisław Kiedrzyński, pseudonym Host 'Gospodarz' (1905–1976) - Warsaw insurgent, lieutenant of the cavalry reserve. He took part in the underground in 1939-1944 in the 5th District (Mokotów) of the Warsaw District of the Home Army in the squadron of the 1st Józef Piłsudski Light Cavalry Regiment. He passed the combat trail: Czerniaków - Sielce.
- Janusz Kiedrzyński, pseudonym Wiktor (1925-1944) - Warsaw insurgent, officer cadet corporal. He fought in the ranks of the Home Army - "Zaremba-Piorun" battalion - 2nd company. Combat trail: Śródmieście Południe. Severely wounded, shot by a sniper - died as a result of his injuries on August 13, 1944.

== See also ==
- Ostoja CoA
- Clan of Ostoja

== Bibliografia ==
- K. Niesiecki, Herbarz polski, wyd. J.N. Bobrowicz, Lipsk 1839-1845, t. XI s. 217.
- A. Boniecki, Herbarz polski, Warszawa 1889-1913, t. X, s. 19-20.
- S. Uruski, Rodzina. Herbarz szlachty polskiej, Warszawa 1904-1931, t. IV, s. 305-306.
- T. Jurek (red.), Słownik historyczno-geograficzny ziem polskich w średniowieczu, Instytut Historii Polskiej Akademii Nauk, 2010-2019, Kraków, część II, s. 497-498.
- Biblioteka Kórnicka, PAN, Teki Dworzaczka, dostęp: 2021.03.11.
- W. J. Skowroński, Rody szlacheckie w Wielkopolsce w XVI – XIX w., Biblioteka Poznańskiego Towarzystwa Przyjaciół Nauk. Litera K cz. I, s. 67-71.
- E. Sęczys, Szlachta wylegitymowana w Królestwie Polskim w latach 1836-1861, Warszawa 2000, s. 285-286.
- Słownik miejscowości i elity wiejskiej zachodniej Małopolski w latach 1772-1815, (oprac.) Ł. Jewuła, T. Kargol, K. Ślusarek, Kraków 2015. Miejscowości zachodniej Małopolski: Kamyk, Kiedrzyn. Elita zachodniej Małopolski: Kierdzyński Antoni, Kierdzyński Stanisław.
