= Dobrosław =

Dobrosław may refer to:

- Dobrosław (given name), Polish given name
- Dobrosław, Łódź Voivodeship, village in Poland
- Dobrosław-Kolonia, village in Poland
