= Brzozowiec =

Brzozowiec may refer to the following places:

- Brzozowiec, Łódź Voivodeship (central Poland)
- Brzozowiec, Lublin Voivodeship (east Poland)
- Brzozowiec, Subcarpathian Voivodeship (south-east Poland)
- Brzozowiec, Masovian Voivodeship (east-central Poland)
- Brzozowiec, Greater Poland Voivodeship (west-central Poland)
- Brzozowiec, Lubusz Voivodeship (west Poland)
- Brzozowiec, Opole Voivodeship (south-west Poland)
