= Węglewice, Wieruszów County =

Węglewice
- Village
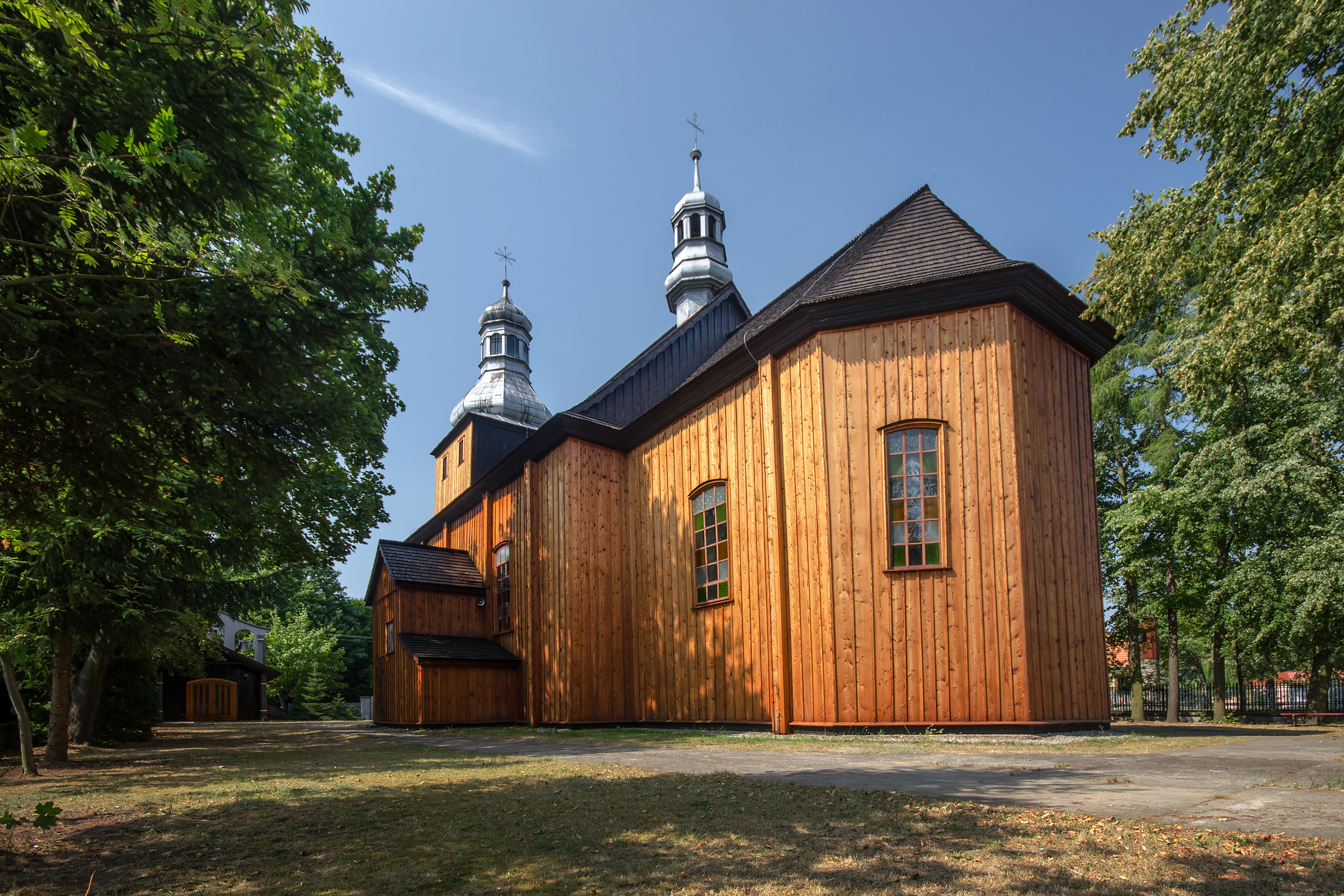
- Holy Trinity church in Węglewice

- Location within Poland
- Coordinates: 51°23′39″N 18°12′53″E
- Country: Poland
- Voivodeship: Łódź
- County: Wieruszów
- Gmina: Galewice
- Time zone: UTC+1 (CET)
  - Summer (DST): UTC+2 (CEST)
- Vehicle registration: EWE

Węglewice [vɛŋɡlɛˈvit͡sɛ] is a village in the administrative district of Gmina Galewice, within Wieruszów County, Łódź Voivodeship, in central Poland.

== History ==
As part of the Kingdom of Poland, between the 16th and 18th centuries, it was a private village, owned by the Walknowski and Karśnicki noble families. Stanisław Walknowski erected the Holy Trinity church in the village.

In the Second Partition of Poland, in 1793, the village was annexed by Prussia. In 1807, it was regained by Poles and included within the short-lived Duchy of Warsaw, and following the duchy's dissolution in 1815, it fell to the Russian Partition of Poland. In 1827, the village had a population of 370. In June 1863, during the January Uprising, a Polish insurgent unit was formed in the village, however, it had to retreat before the advancing Russian forces towards Lututów, where it eventually fought the Battle of Lututów. Following World War I, in 1918, Poland regained independence and control of the village.

During the German occupation of Poland (World War II), in 1941, the occupiers carried out expulsions of Poles, who were then enslaved as forced labour and either sent to new German colonists in the county or deported to Germany. Their houses and farms were handed over to German colonists as part of the Lebensraum policy.
