= Lututów =

- Town
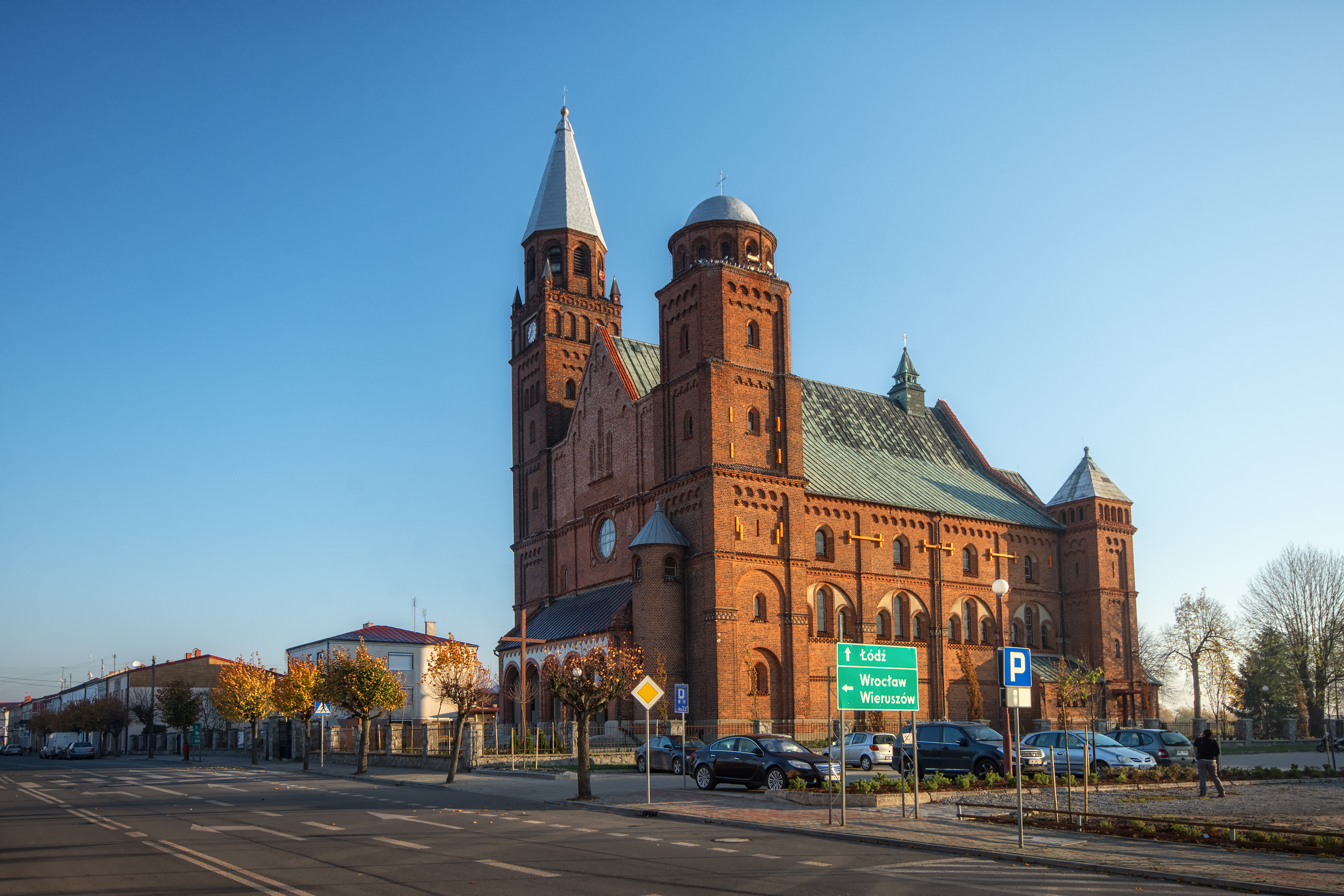
- Church of Saints Peter and Paul

- Coat of arms

- Location within Poland
- Coordinates: 51°22′19″N 18°26′1″E
- Country: Poland
- Voivodeship: Łódź
- County: Wieruszów
- Gmina: Lututów
- First mentioned: 1406

Population (31 December 2020)
  - Total: 2,241 ▲
- Time zone: UTC+1 (CET)
  - Summer (DST): UTC+2 (CEST)
- Vehicle registration: EWE

Lututów [luˈtutuf] is a small town in Wieruszów County, Łódź Voivodeship, in central Poland. It is the seat of the gmina (administrative district) called Gmina Lututów. It lies approximately 22 km (14 mi) east of Wieruszów and 85 km (53 mi) south-west of the regional capital Łódź. The town has a population of 2,241 (2020).

== History ==
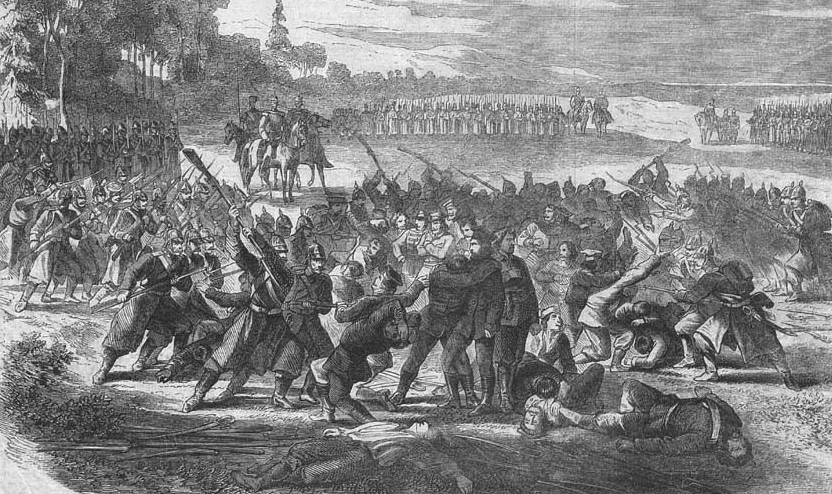
Battle of Lututów (1863)

The town was first mentioned in 1406 under the name Lutuldisthat (from German Lutoldsstadt, translated Lutoldstown). Lututów was a private town, administratively located in the Wieluń County in the Sieradz Voivodeship in the Greater Poland Province of the Kingdom of Poland. It was annexed by Prussia in the Second Partition of Poland in 1793. In 1807 it was regained by Poles and included within the short-lived Duchy of Warsaw, and in 1815 it fell to the Russian Partition of Poland. The Battle of Lututów was fought there between Polish insurgents and Russian troops on 15 June 1863, during the January Uprising. It was eventually restored to Poland, when the country regained independence after World War I in 1918.

During the German occupation of World War II, in December 1941 and January 1942, the occupiers carried out expulsions of Poles, who were deported to a transit camp in nearby Wieluń, and then deported either to forced labor to Germany or to the General Government in the more eastern part of German-occupied Poland, while their houses were handed over to German colonists as part of the Lebensraum policy. The town's Jewish population of around 1,000 was almost completely annihilated by the Germans during the occupation in World War II. The Jews were sent to forced labour camps, and, for most, deported to Chelmno extermination camp where all were immediately gassed. A few survivors returned at the end of the war but fled soon after.

On 1 January 2020, Lututów regained its town rights.

== Neighbourhoods ==
Neighbourhoods of Lututów include: Dębina, Jesionki, Jeżopole, Młynek, Piaski, Poduchowne, Zygmuntów, Żmuda.

== Transport ==
The Voivodeship road 482 bypasses the town, and the S8 highway passes nearby, south-east of the town.

The nearest railway station is in Wieluń.
