= Knapy, Łódź Voivodeship =

Knapy
- Village
- Location within Poland
- Coordinates: 51°23′12″N 18°30′37″E
- Country: Poland
- Voivodeship: Łódź
- County: Wieruszów
- Gmina: Lututów

Knapy [ˈknapɨ] is a village in the administrative district of Gmina Lututów, within Wieruszów County, Łódź Voivodeship, in central Poland.
