= Kornelin, Łódź Voivodeship =

Kornelin
- Village
- Location within Poland
- Coordinates: 51°22′45″N 18°27′26″E
- Country: Poland
- Voivodeship: Łódź
- County: Wieruszów
- Gmina: Lututów

Kornelin [kɔrˈnɛlin] is a village in the administrative district of Gmina Lututów, within Wieruszów County, Łódź Voivodeship, in central Poland.
