= Janusz, Łódź Voivodeship =

Janusz
- Village
- Location within Poland
- Coordinates: 51°23′4″N 18°27′34″E
- Country: Poland
- Voivodeship: Łódź
- County: Wieruszów
- Gmina: Lututów

Janusz [ˈjanuʂ] is a village in the administrative district of Gmina Lututów, within Wieruszów County, Łódź Voivodeship, in central Poland.
