= Wiry, Łódź Voivodeship =

Wiry
- Village
- Location within Poland
- Coordinates: 51°20′36″N 18°30′34″E
- Country: Poland
- Voivodeship: Łódź
- County: Wieruszów
- Gmina: Lututów

Wiry [ˈvirɨ] is a village in the administrative district of Gmina Lututów, within Wieruszów County, Łódź Voivodeship, in central Poland.
