= Popielina-Towarzystwo =

- Village
- Location within Poland
- Coordinates: 51°23′20″N 18°23′18″E
- Country: Poland
- Voivodeship: Łódź
- County: Wieruszów
- Gmina: Lututów

Popielina-Towarzystwo [pɔpjɛˈlina tɔvaˈʐɨstfɔ] is a village in the administrative district of Gmina Lututów, within Wieruszów County, Łódź Voivodeship, in central Poland.
