= Kijanice =

- Village
- Location within Poland
- Coordinates: 51°22′2″N 18°27′55″E
- Country: Poland
- Voivodeship: Łódź
- County: Wieruszów
- Gmina: Lututów

Kijanice [kijaˈnit͡sɛ] is a village in the administrative district of Gmina Lututów, within Wieruszów County, Łódź Voivodeship, in central Poland.
