= Hipolity =

- Village
- Location within Poland
- Coordinates: 51°21′33″N 18°28′16″E
- Country: Poland
- Voivodeship: Łódź
- County: Wieruszów
- Gmina: Lututów

Hipolity [xipɔˈlitɨ] is a village in the administrative district of Gmina Lututów, within Wieruszów County, Łódź Voivodeship, in central Poland.
