= Walknówek =

- Village
- Location within Poland
- Coordinates: 51°22′45″N 18°28′31″E
- Country: Poland
- Voivodeship: Łódź
- County: Wieruszów
- Gmina: Lututów

Walknówek [valkˈnuvɛk] is a village in the administrative district of Gmina Lututów, in Wieruszów County, Łódź Voivodeship, in central Poland.
