= Kozub =

- Village
- Location within Poland
- Coordinates: 51°23′N 18°33′E
- Country: Poland
- Voivodeship: Łódź
- County: Wieruszów
- Gmina: Lututów
- Population: 72

Kozub [ˈkɔzup] is a village in the administrative district of Gmina Lututów, within Wieruszów County, Łódź Voivodeship, in central Poland.
