= Battle of Lututów =

- Part of the January Uprising
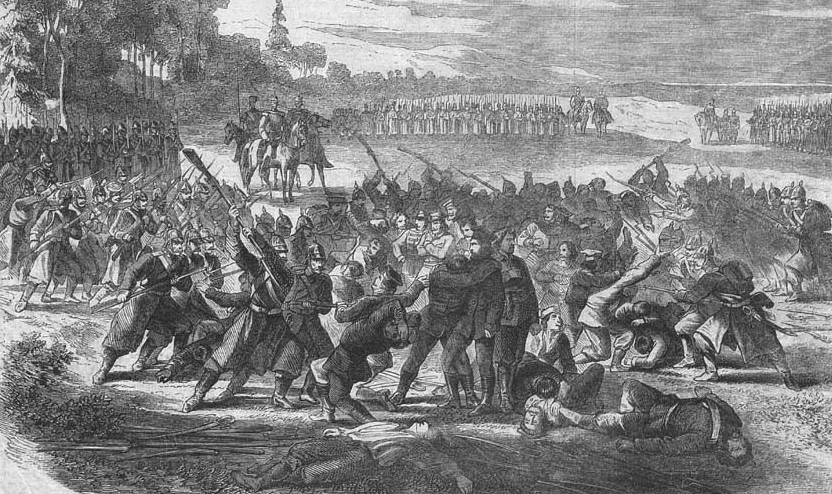
Date	15 June 1863
Location	Lututów
Result	Russian victory

Belligerents
(Poland) Polish insurgents	Russian Empire

Commanders and leaders
Colonel Antoni Korotyński (DOW)	Colonel Vsevolod Pomerantsev; Colonel Tarasenkov

Casualties and losses
64 dead, 46 wounded, 4 POWs	Unknown

The Battle of Lututów was a clash between Polish rebel forces and units of the Imperial Russian Army. It took place during the January Uprising, on June 15, 1863, near the village of Lututów, which at that time belonged to Russian-controlled Congress Poland. Rebel forces, commanded by Antoni Korotyński were defeated by the Russians.

== Battle and massacre ==
On June 14, 1863, a Polish insurgent unit retreated before the advancing Russian forces from Węglewice to Lututów. Later that day the Russians approached the insurgents in Lututów. The Poles then split into two groups, one of which broke through the Russian encirclement to rescue people and weapons. The remaining group of 120 scythemen, led by Antoni Korotyński, engaged in a battle with 10 times more numerous Russians, which was doomed to be unsuccessful from the beginning. Some of the insurgents surrendered, but the Russian commander ordered the murder of captured Polish prisoners and the battle turned into a massacre. Korotyński's unit was completely annihilated, as 64 rebels were killed and 46 were wounded. All the dead and wounded were stripped naked by the Russians and many of the dead had their throats slit. Polish commander Antoni Korotyński, fatally wounded, died shortly after the battle.

== Burial and memorials ==
Bodies of the rebels were buried in a mass grave at the local cemetery. The location of the battle is marked by two large crosses and boulders.

== Sources ==
- Stefan Kieniewicz: Powstanie styczniowe. Warszawa: Państwowe Wydawnictwo Naukowe, 1983. ISBN 83-01-03652-4.
