= Chojny, Łódź Voivodeship =

Chojny
- Village
- Location within Poland
- Coordinates: 51°21′N 18°32′E
- Country: Poland
- Voivodeship: Łódź
- County: Wieruszów
- Gmina: Lututów

Chojny [ˈxɔi̯nɨ] is a village in the administrative district of Gmina Lututów, within Wieruszów County, Łódź Voivodeship, in central Poland.
