= Piaski, Gmina Lututów =

Piaski
- Neighbourhood of Lututów
- Location within Poland
- Coordinates: 51°22′21″N 18°24′30″E
- Country: Poland
- Voivodeship: Łódź
- County: Wieruszów
- Gmina: Lututów
- Time zone: UTC+1 (CET)
  - Summer (DST): UTC+2 (CEST)
- Vehicle registration: EWE

Piaski (Polish pronunciation: [ˈpjaskʲi]) is a neighbourhood of Lututów, Poland, located in the western part of the town.

== History ==
During the German occupation of Poland (World War II), in December 1941 and January 1942, the German gendarmerie carried out expulsions of Poles, who were placed in a transit camp in nearby Wieluń, and then deported either to the General Government in the more eastern part of German-occupied Poland or to forced labour in Germany, while their houses were handed over to German colonists as part of the Lebensraum policy.
