= Świątkowice, Łódź Voivodeship =

Świątkowice
- Village
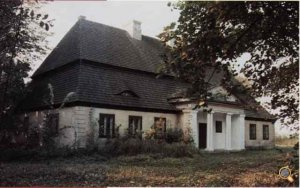
- Old manor in Świątkowice

- Location within Poland
- Coordinates: 51°19′N 18°29′E
- Country: Poland
- Voivodeship: Łódź
- County: Wieruszów
- Gmina: Lututów
- Time zone: UTC+1 (CET)
  - Summer (DST): UTC+2 (CEST)
- Vehicle registration: EWE

Świątkowice (Polish pronunciation: [ɕfjɔntkɔˈvit͡sɛ]) is a village in the administrative district of Gmina Lututów, within Wieruszów County, Łódź Voivodeship, in central Poland.

== History ==
The territory became a part of the emerging Polish state under its first historic ruler Mieszko I in the 10th century. The village was mentioned in a document in 1357. In 1406, the local church became a filial church of the parish in Lututów.

In 1827, Świątkowice had a population of 309.

During the German occupation of Poland (World War II), in 1940–1941, the German gendarmerie carried out expulsions of Poles, who were either deported to the General Government in the more eastern part of German-occupied Poland or enslaved as forced labour in the region or in Germany. Houses and farms of expelled Poles were handed over to German colonists as part of the Lebensraum policy.
