= Bielawy, Wieruszów County =

Bielawy
- Village
- Location within Poland
- Coordinates: 50°41′12.01″N 16°37′4.88″E
- Country: Poland
- Voivodeship: Łódź
- County: Wieruszów
- Gmina: Lututów

Bielawy [bjɛˈlavɨ] is a village in the administrative district of Gmina Lututów, within Wieruszów County, Łódź Voivodeship, in central Poland.
