= Huta, Wieruszów County =

Huta
- Village
- Location within Poland
- Coordinates: 51°22′N 18°32′E
- Country: Poland
- Voivodeship: Łódź
- County: Wieruszów
- Gmina: Lututów
- Time zone: UTC+1 (CET)
  - Summer (DST): UTC+2 (CEST)
- Vehicle registration: EWE

Huta [ˈxuta] is a village in the administrative district of Gmina Lututów, within Wieruszów County, Łódź Voivodeship, in central Poland.

== History ==
In 1827, Huta had a population of 241.

During the German occupation of Poland (World War II), in December 1941 and January 1942, the German gendarmerie carried out expulsions of Poles, who were placed in a transit camp in nearby Wieluń, and then deported either to the General Government in the more eastern part of German-occupied Poland or to forced labour in Germany, while their houses were handed over to German colonists as part of the Lebensraum policy.

== Transport ==
The S8 highway bypasses the village in the east.
