= Łęki Duże =

- Village
- Location within Poland
- Coordinates: 51°20′42″N 18°26′46″E
- Country: Poland
- Voivodeship: Łódź
- County: Wieruszów
- Gmina: Lututów
- Population: 190

Łęki Duże (Polish pronunciation: [ˈwɛŋkʲi ˈduʐɛ]) is a village in the administrative district of Gmina Lututów, within Wieruszów County, Łódź Voivodeship, in central Poland.
