= Dębina, Wieruszów County =

Dębina
- Neighbourhood of Lututów
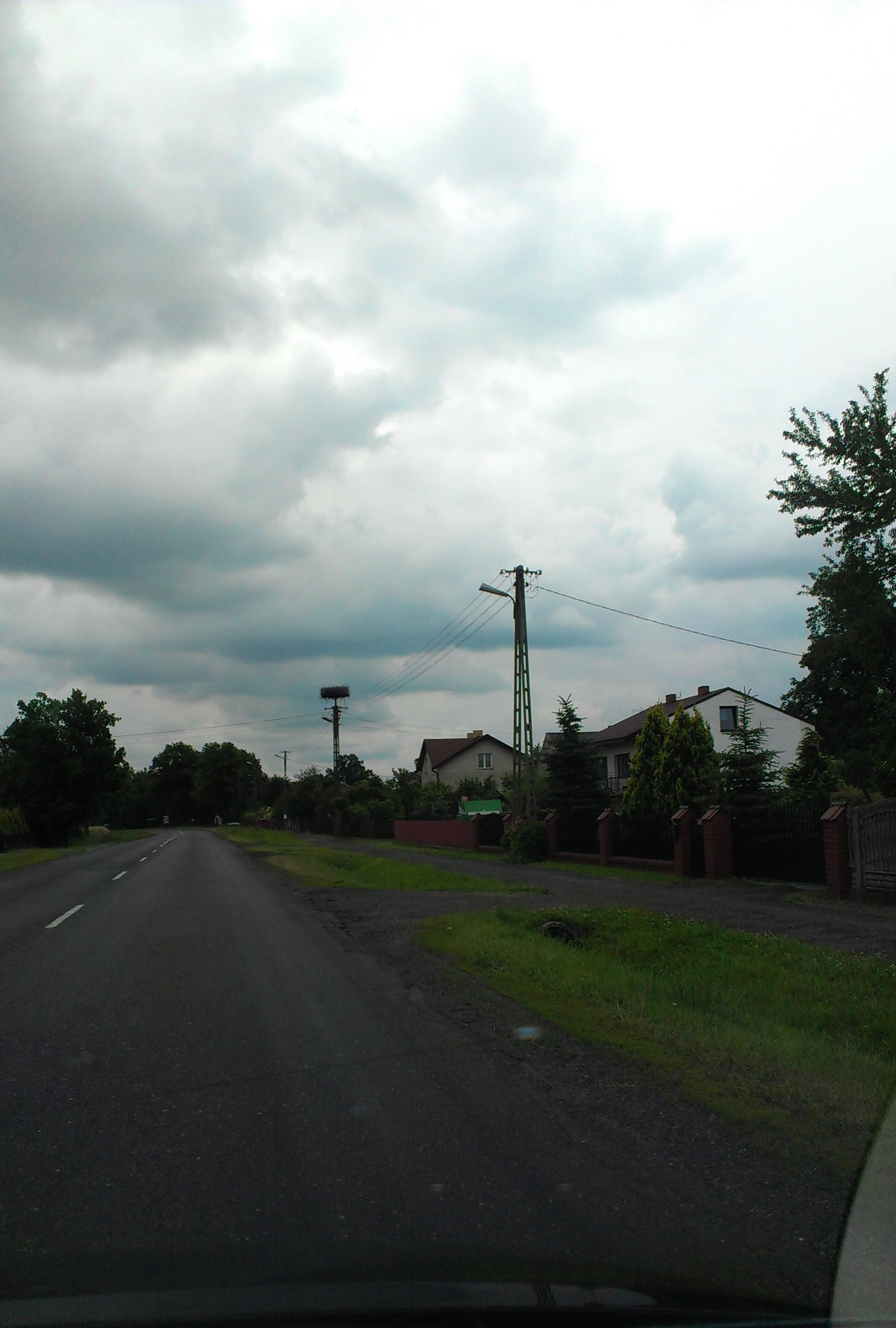

- Location within Poland
- Coordinates: 51°23′N 18°27′E
- Country: Poland
- Voivodeship: Łódź
- County: Wieruszów
- Gmina: Lututów
- Time zone: UTC+1 (CET)
  - Summer (DST): UTC+2 (CEST)
- Vehicle registration: EWE

Dębina [dɛmˈbina] is a neighbourhood of Lututów, Poland, located in the north-eastern part of the town.
