= Żmuda =

- Neighbourhood of Lututów
- Location within Poland
- Coordinates: 51°22′N 18°28′E
- Country: Poland
- Voivodeship: Łódź
- County: Wieruszów
- Gmina: Lututów
- Time zone: UTC+1 (CET)
  - Summer (DST): UTC+2 (CEST)
- Vehicle registration: EWE

Żmuda [ˈʐmuda] is a neighbourhood of Lututów, Poland, located in the eastern part of the town.
