= Józefina, Wieruszów County =

Józefina
- Village
- Location within Poland
- Coordinates: 51°23′39″N 18°29′24″E
- Country: Poland
- Voivodeship: Łódź
- County: Wieruszów
- Gmina: Lututów
- Population: 50

Józefina [juzɛˈfina] is a village in the administrative district of Gmina Lututów, within Wieruszów County, Łódź Voivodeship, in central Poland.
