= Gmina Lututów =

Gmina Lututów Lututów Commune
- Gmina
- Coat of arms
- Interactive map of Gmina Lututów
- Coordinates (Lututów): 51°22′19″N 18°26′1″E
- Country: Poland
- Voivodeship: Łódź
- County: Wieruszów
- Seat: Lututów

Area
  - Total: 75.13 km^{2} (29.01 sq mi)

Population (2006)
  - Total: 4,751
  - Density: 63.24/km^{2} (163.8/sq mi)

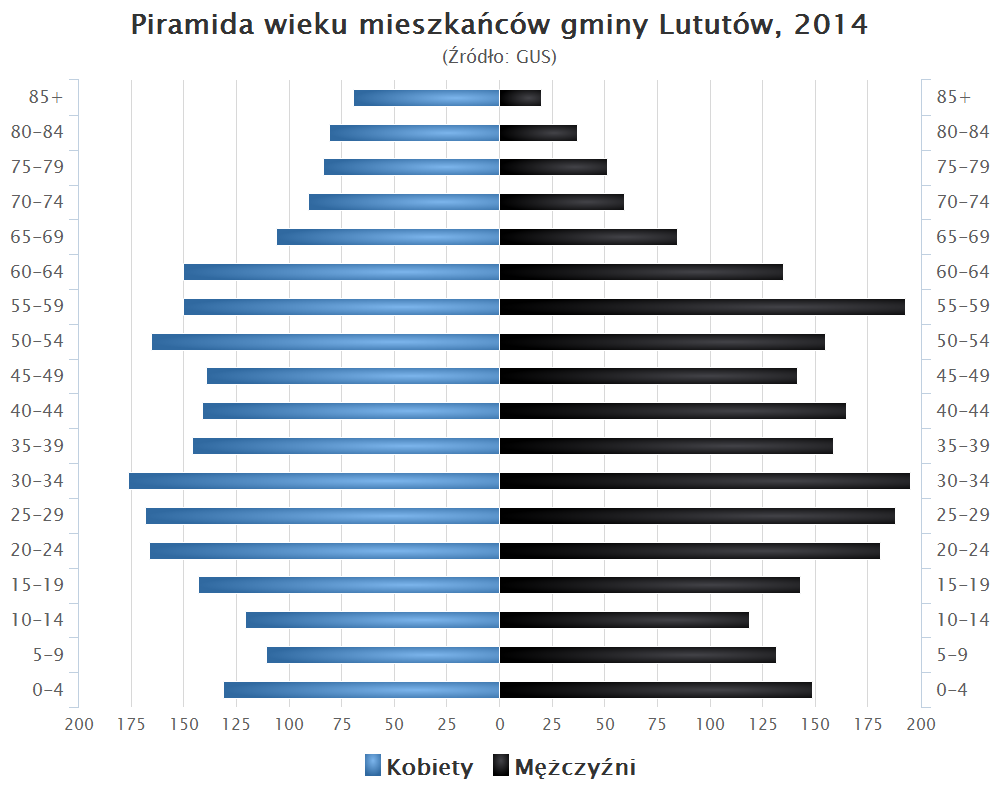
Gmina Lututow

Gmina Lututów is a rural gmina (administrative district) in Wieruszów County, Łódź Voivodeship, in central Poland. Its seat is the village of Lututów, which lies approximately 22 kilometres (14 mi) east of Wieruszów and 85 km (53 mi) south-west of the regional capital Łódź.

The gmina covers an area of 75.13 square kilometres (29.0 sq mi), and as of 2006 its total population is 4,751.

== Villages ==
Gmina Lututów contains the villages and settlements of Augustynów, Bielawy, Brzozowiec, Chojny, Dębina, Dobrosław, Dobrosław-Kolonia, Dymki, Hipolity, Huta, Janusz, Jeżopole, Józefina, Kijanice, Kłoniczki, Kluski, Knapy, Kopaniny, Kornelin, Kozub, Łęki Duże, Łęki Małe, Lututów, Niemojew, Ostrycharze, Piaski, Piaski-Młynek, Popielina, Popielina-Towarzystwo, Świątkowice, Swoboda, Walknówek, Wiry, Żmuda and Zygmuntów.

== Neighbouring gminas ==
Gmina Lututów is bordered by the gminas of Biała, Czarnożyły, Galewice, Klonowa, Ostrówek, Sokolniki and Złoczew.
