= Jeżopole =

- Neighbourhood of Lututów
- Location within Poland
- Coordinates: 51°23′N 18°28′E
- Country: Poland
- Voivodeship: Łódź
- County: Wieruszów
- Gmina: Lututów
- Time zone: UTC+1 (CET)
  - Summer (DST): UTC+2 (CEST)
- Vehicle registration: EWE

Jeżopole [jɛʐɔˈpɔlɛ] is a neighbourhood of Lututów, Poland, located in the north-eastern part of the town.

== History ==
During the German occupation of Poland (World War II), in December 1941 and January 1942, the German gendarmerie carried out expulsions of Poles, who were placed in a transit camp in nearby Wieluń, and then deported either to the General Government in the more eastern part of German-occupied Poland or to forced labour in Germany, while their houses were handed over to German colonists as part of the Lebensraum policy.
