= Brzozowiec, Łódź Voivodeship =

Brzozowiec
- Village
- Location within Poland
- Coordinates: 51°20′6″N 18°27′48″E
- Country: Poland
- Voivodeship: Łódź
- County: Wieruszów
- Gmina: Lututów
- Population: 70

Brzozowiec [bʐɔˈzɔvjɛt͡s] is a village in the administrative district of Gmina Lututów, within Wieruszów County, Łódź Voivodeship, in central Poland.
