= Dobrosław, Łódź Voivodeship =

Dobrosław
- Village
- Location within Poland
- Coordinates: 51°21′N 18°28′E
- Country: Poland
- Voivodeship: Łódź
- County: Wieruszów
- Gmina: Lututów

Dobrosław [dɔˈbrɔswaf] is a village in the administrative district of Gmina Lututów, within Wieruszów County, Łódź Voivodeship, in central Poland.
