= Dobrosław-Kolonia =

- Village
- Location within Poland
- Coordinates: 51°20′35″N 18°28′18″E
- Country: Poland
- Voivodeship: Łódź
- County: Wieruszów
- Gmina: Lututów
- Population: 100

Dobrosław-Kolonia [dɔˈbrɔswaf kɔˈlɔɲa] is a village in the administrative district of Gmina Lututów, within Wieruszów County, Łódź Voivodeship, in central Poland.
