= Wola Kiedrzyńska =

- Village
- Location within Poland
- Coordinates: 50°52′N 19°6′E
- Country: Poland
- Voivodeship: Silesian
- County: Częstochowa
- Gmina: Mykanów
- Population: 324

Wola Kiedrzyńska [ˈvɔla kʲɛˈdʐɨɲska] is a village in the administrative district of Gmina Mykanów, within Częstochowa County, Silesian Voivodeship, in southern Poland.
