= Piaski-Młynek =

- Village
- Location within Poland
- Coordinates: 51°21′32″N 18°25′09″E
- Country: Poland
- Voivodeship: Łódź
- County: Wieruszów
- Gmina: Lututów

Piaski-Młynek (Polish pronunciation: [ˈpjaskʲi ˈmwɨnɛk]) is a village in the administrative district of Gmina Lututów, within Wieruszów County, Łódź Voivodeship, in central Poland.
