= Isaac Kramnick =

American political theorist (1938–2019)

- Born: March 6, 1938; Worcester, Massachusetts, U.S.
- Died: December 21, 2019 (aged 81); New York City, U.S.
- Education: Harvard University (BA, PhD); Peterhouse, Cambridge (MPhil)
- Scientific career
- Fields: Political Science, History

Isaac Kramnick (March 6, 1938 – December 21, 2019) was an American political theorist, historian of political thought, political scientist, and the Richard J. Schwartz Professor of Government at Cornell University. He was a subject-matter expert on English and American political thought and history.

== Research ==
Kramnick researched, wrote, or edited about twenty treatises. His Bolingbroke and His Circle: The Politics of Nostalgia in the Age of Walpole was awarded the Conference of British Studies Prize for the best book on British politics. His other works included the Godless Constitution: A Moral Defense of the Secular State, co-authored with R. Laurence Moore, studies of Edmund Burke, a biography of the English socialist Harold Laski, and an edition of The Federalist Papers. Kramnick edited American Political Thought (2009) with Cornell’s Professor Theodore Lowi. An excerpt:

“America has a conservative political tradition that is just as broad and deep as the liberal tradition. But the two are rarely in true competition, let alone dialectical tension. They are as ships passing the day – conservatism being local and parochial, liberalism more cosmopolitan; conservatism concerned with order and obligation, liberalism with consequences and satisfactions. One pursues goodness, the other happiness.”

Professor Kramnick’s research was perhaps less data-oriented than directed toward a textual critique of the metaphysical, the product of extensive reading and writing. This is true of his 1986 work on Joseph Priestley, author of The Doctrine of Philosophical Necessity Illustrated (1777).

== The Godless Constitution ==
Kramnick's controversial treatise, written with Cornell co-faculty member R. Laurence Moore, does not deny that the Republic's founding generation had religious beliefs. Rather, The Godless Constitution argues that the founding fathers believed that a clear separation between religious and civil authority could prevent a specific kind of tyranny. Kramnick and Moore suggest that the colonial 18th century American eastern seaboard experience proved that civil magistrates given religious authority used that power irresponsibly. By separating church and state, one preserved the integrity of both.

== Personal life ==
Isaac Kramnick and his wife, author Miriam Brody, have three children: Rebecca, Jonathan and Leah. Isaac and Miriam also have four grandchildren: Madeline, Anna, Samuel and Milo.

== Early life and career ==
Kramnick was a native of Millis, Massachusetts, the son of Max and Sarah Shushulski Kramnick. The family emigrated from Grudno, which then was in the Silesia region of the German Empire. Isaac Kramnick took his bachelor's and doctoral degrees from Harvard (1959, summa cum laude; 1965) and studied at Cambridge University from 1959 to 1960. He taught at Harvard University, Brandeis University, and Yale University, and arrived at Cornell in 1972.

Kramnick served as Chair of Cornell's Government Department (1981–1985; 1996–2001). He was Associate Dean of the College of Arts and Sciences (1986–1989) and Faculty-elected Trustee (1990–1994). Professor Kramnick was Vice Provost for Undergraduate Education at Cornell from 2001 to 2005. During this time, he provided leadership for Cornell's initiative to reorganize undergraduate residence policy. Kramnick's commitment to the quality of Cornell's undergraduate living and learning included service as a founding member of the Cornell Faculty Fellows and Faculty-in-Residence programs and as a faculty leader in the University Committee on Restructuring West Campus Residential Life. Just after the turn of the century, Kramnick was responsible for the planning and coordinating academic programming for Cornell's North and West campuses. He also was in charge of undergraduate research opportunities, student advising, and the art and practice of teaching.

== Honors ==
Professor Kramnick was a fellow of Britain's Royal Historical Society. He has also served as President of the American Society for Eighteenth Century Studies (1989). In 1998, the American Academy of Arts and Sciences elected him fellow. Cornell University honored him with the Clark Award for distinguished teaching (1978) and the Steven Weiss Presidential Fellow Prize (1988) for teaching, and the Cornell Students chose him as "favorite professor of the year" (1996).

== Memberships ==
Professor Kramnick was a member of Cornell's Sphinx Head Society.

== Sample publications ==
- Isaac Kramnick and Laurence Moore, Godless Citizens in a Godly Republic: Atheists in American Public Life, 2018;
- American Political Thought: A Norton Anthology (I. Kramnick & T. Lowi, eds. 2009);
- Alexis de Tocqueville, Democracy in America (Kramick & Bevan, ed.) (2003);
- Isaac Kramnick & Laurence Moore, Godless Constitution: A Moral Defense of the Secular State (1996);
- The Portable Enlightenment Reader (I. Kramnick, ed.) (Viking Portable Library, 1995);
- Isaac Kramnick and Barry Sheerman, Harold Laski: A Life on the Left (1993);
- Isaac Kramnick, Republicanism and Bourgeois Radicalism: Political Ideology in Late Eighteenth-Century England and America (1990);
- Federalist Papers (Isaac Kramnick, ed. 1987)
- Isaac Kramnick, “Eighteenth Century Science and Radical Social Theory: The Case of Joseph Priestley’s Scientific Liberalism,” 25 J. Brit. Studies (1986) at 1-30.
- Isaac Kramnick, Age of Ideology: Political Thought, 1750 to the Present (Foundations of Modern Political Science, 1979);
- Isaac Kramnick, The Rage of Edmund Burke: Portrait of an Ambivalent Conservative (1977);
- Isaac Kramnick, Revolution: Definitions and Explanations, A Critique of Recent Scholarship (1972);
- The Bolingbroke Political Writings (Viscount Bolingbroke & I. Kramnick, eds. 1970);
- Isaac Kramnick, Bolingbroke and His Circle: The Politics of Nostalgia in the Age of Walpole (1968).
