= Okrajnik, Jawor County =

Okrajnik
- Village
- Location within Poland
- Coordinates: 50°55′34″N 16°56′58″E
- Country: Poland
- Voivodeship: Lower Silesian
- County: Jawor
- Gmina: Bolków

Okrajnik is a village in Gmina Bolków, Jawor County, Lower Silesian Voivodeship, in south-western Poland.

From 1975 to 1998 the village was in Jelenia Góra Voivodeship.
