= Wierzchosławiczki =

- Village
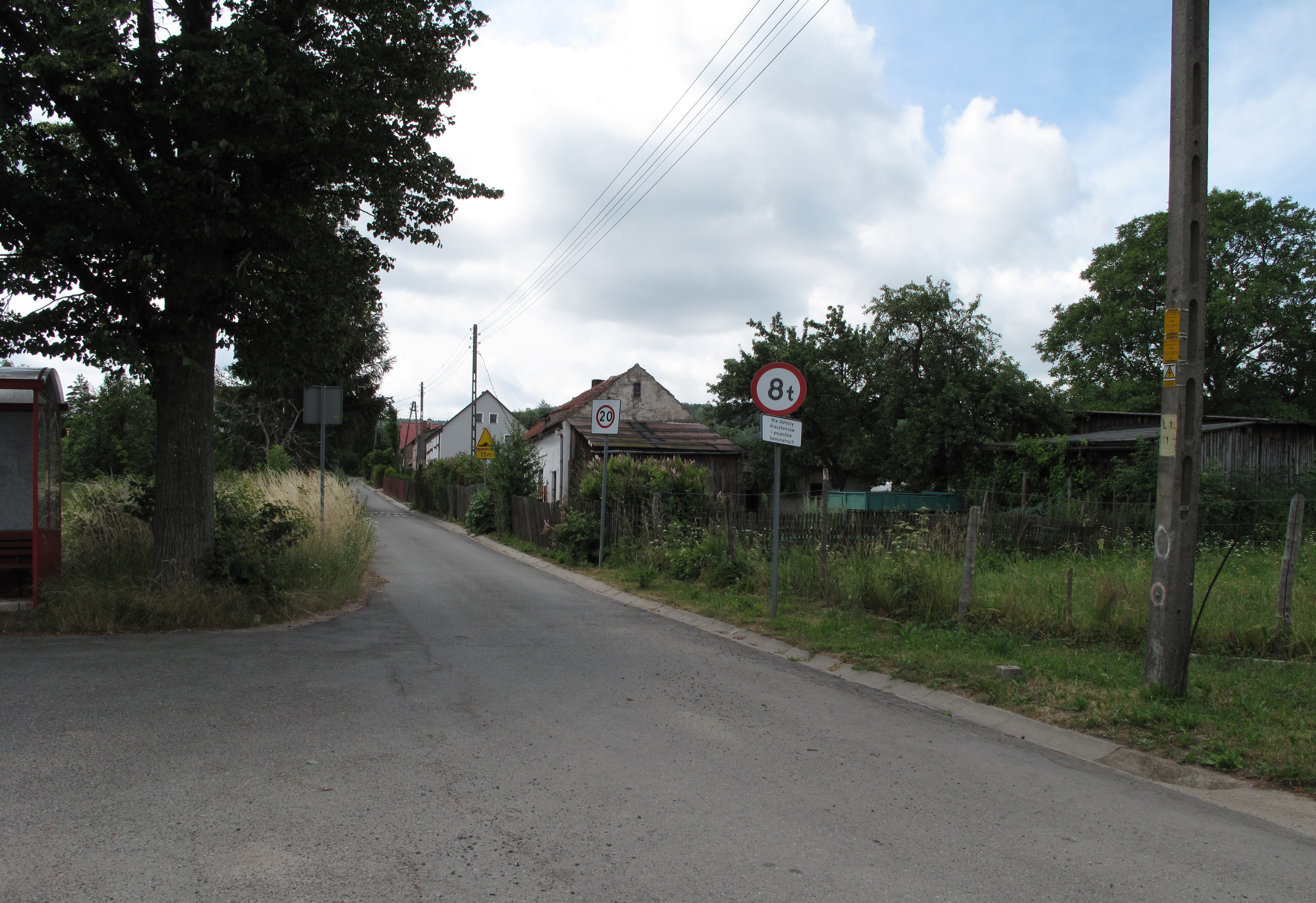
- Road with houses

- Location within Poland
- Coordinates: 50°54′39″N 16°04′04″E
- Country: Poland
- Voivodeship: Lower Silesian
- Powiat: Jawor
- Gmina: Bolków
- Elevation: 385 m (1,263 ft)
- Population: 54

Wierzchosławiczki [vjɛʂxɔswaˈvit͡ʂki] is a village in the administrative district of Gmina Bolków, within Jawor County, Lower Silesian Voivodeship, in south-western Poland.

== Geography ==
small village located in the southwestern part of Poland, within Lower Silesian Voivodeship. Administratively, it is part of Gmina Bolków in Jawor County. The village is situated approximately 8 kilometers southwest of the town of Bolków, 21 kilometers southwest of the county capital Jawor, and about 76 kilometers west of the regional capital Wrocław.

The village lies in a hilly, rural area, with an elevation of around 385 meters above sea level, and is surrounded by agricultural fields, forests, and other small settlements.

== Gallery ==
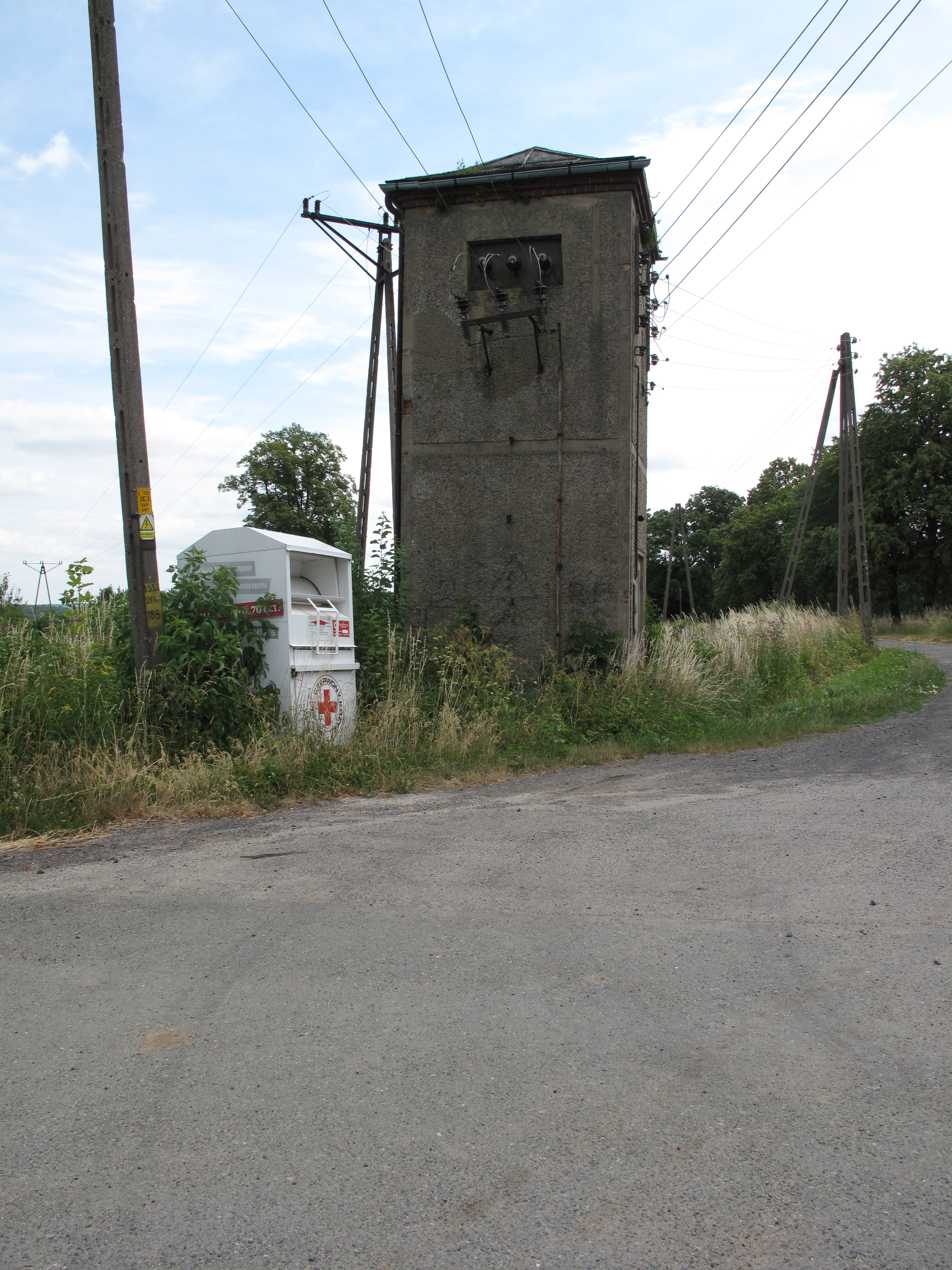
Electric tower

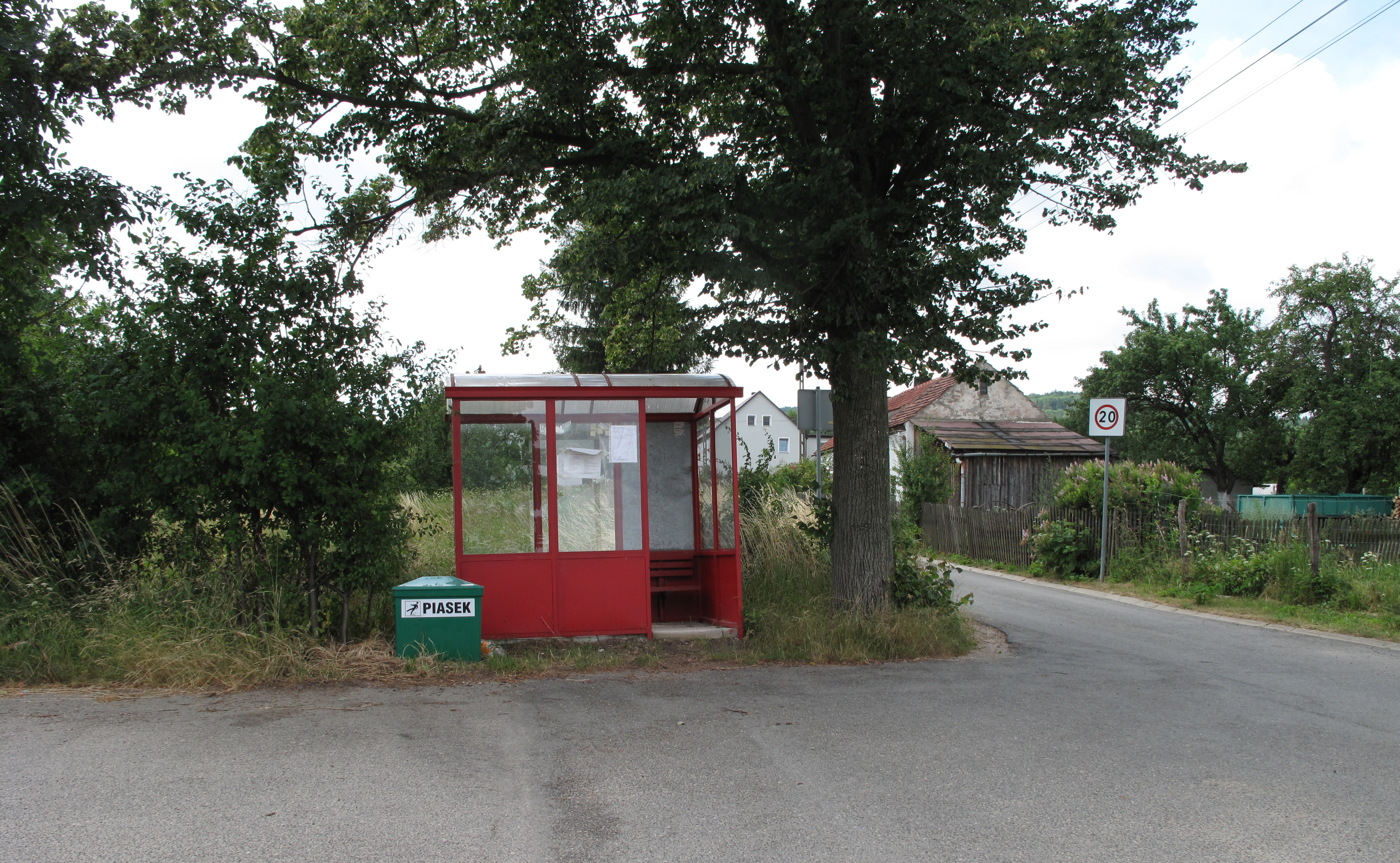
Bus stop shelter

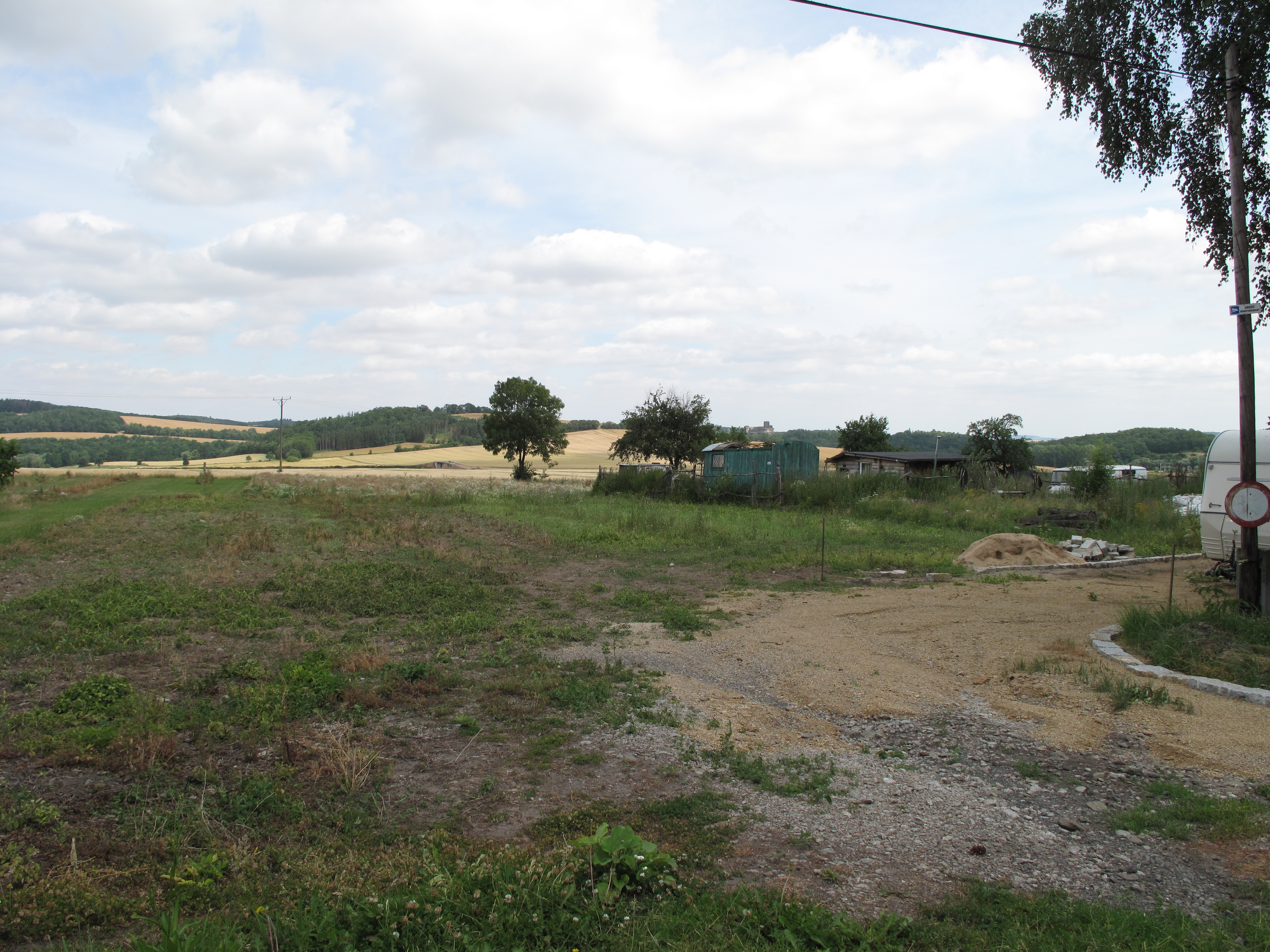
Countryside
