= Gmina Bolków =

Gmina Bolków Bolków Commune
- Gmina
- Flag Coat of arms
- Interactive map of Gmina Bolków
- Coordinates (Bolków): 50°56′N 16°06′E
- Country: Poland
- Voivodeship: Lower Silesian
- County: Jawor
- Seat: Bolków
- Sołectwos: Gorzanowice, Grudno, Jastrowiec, Kaczorów, Lipa, Mysłów, Nowe Rochowice, Płonina, Półwsie, Radzimowice, Sady Dolne, Sady Górne, Stare Rochowice, Świny, Wierzchosławice, Wierzchosławiczki, Wolbromek

Area
  - Total: 152.85 km^{2} (59.02 sq mi)

Population (2019-06-30)
  - Total: 10,458
  - Density: 68.420/km^{2} (177.21/sq mi)
- Website: http://www.bolkow.pl

Gmina Bolków is an urban-rural gmina (administrative district) in Jawor County, Lower Silesian Voivodeship, in south-western Poland. Its seat is the town of Bolków, which lies approximately 15 kilometres (9 mi) south-west of Jawor and 70 kilometres (43 mi) west of the regional capital Wrocław.

The gmina covers an area of 152.8 square kilometres (59.0 mi^{2}), and as of 2019 its total population is 10,458.

== Neighbouring gminas ==
Gmina Bolków is bordered by the town of Wojcieszów and the gminas of Dobromierz, Janowice Wielkie, Marciszów, Męcinka, Paszowice, Stare Bogaczowice and Świerzawa.

== Villages ==
Apart from the town of Bolków, the gmina contains the villages of Figlów, Gorzanowice, Grudno, Jastrowiec, Jeżów, Kaczorów, Lipa, Muchówek, Mysłów, Nowe Rochowice, Okrajnik, Płonina, Półwsie, Radzimowice, Sady Dolne, Sady Górne, Stare Rochowice, Świny, Wierzchosławice, Wierzchosławiczki and Wolbromek.

== Twin towns – sister cities ==
Gmina Bolków is twinned with:

- Bad Muskau, Germany (2006)
- Borken, Germany (1997)
- Doksy, Czech Republic (2006)
