= Sady Górne =

- Village
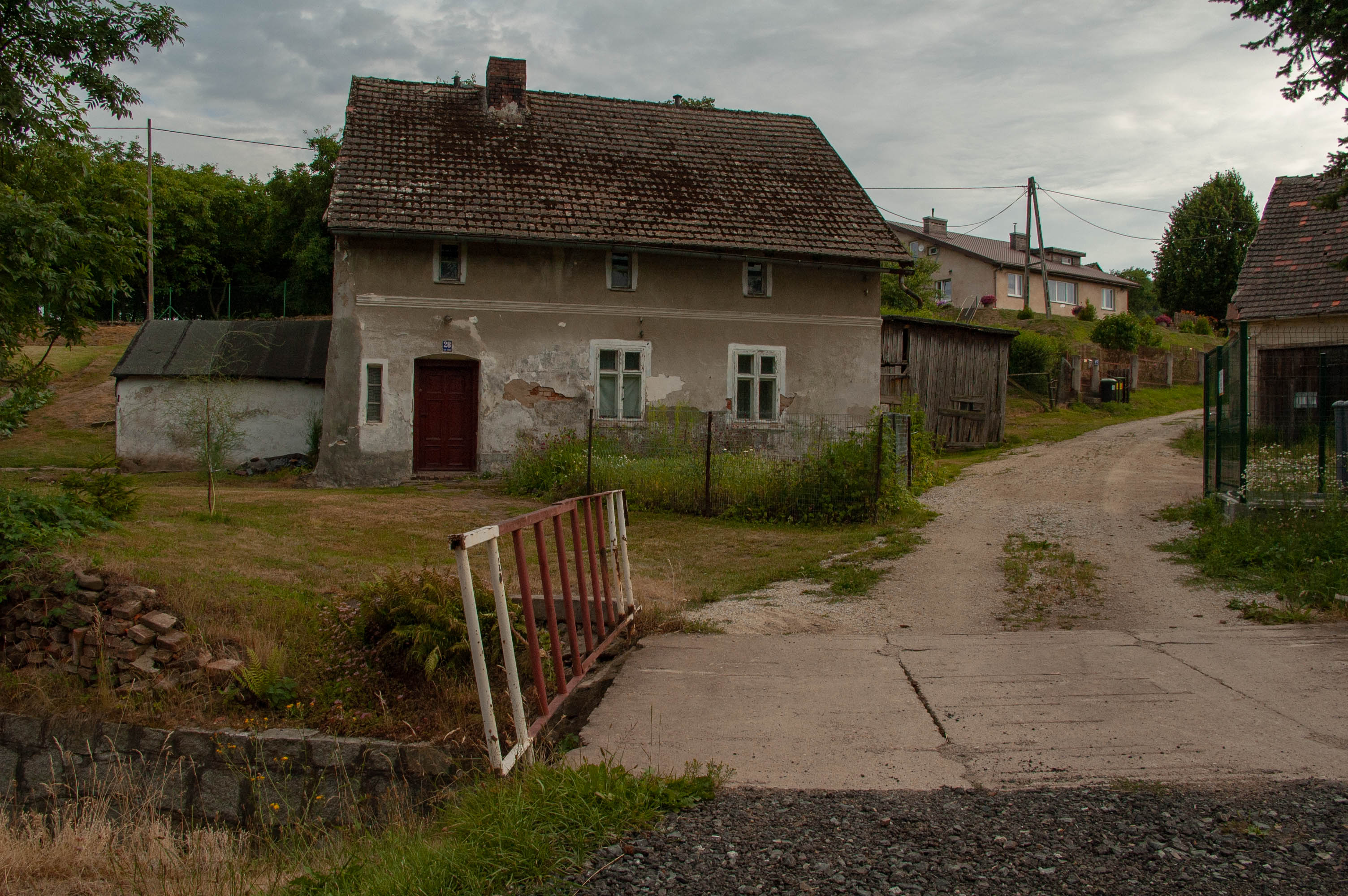
- A house by the road

- Location within Poland
- Coordinates: 50°53′00″N 16°10′00″E
- Country: Poland
- Voivodeship: Lower Silesian
- County: Jawor
- Gmina: Bolków
- Population: 467

Sady Górne [ˈsadɨ ˈɡurnɛ] is a village in the administrative district of Gmina Bolków, within Jawor County, Lower Silesian Voivodeship, in south-western Poland.

== Gallery ==
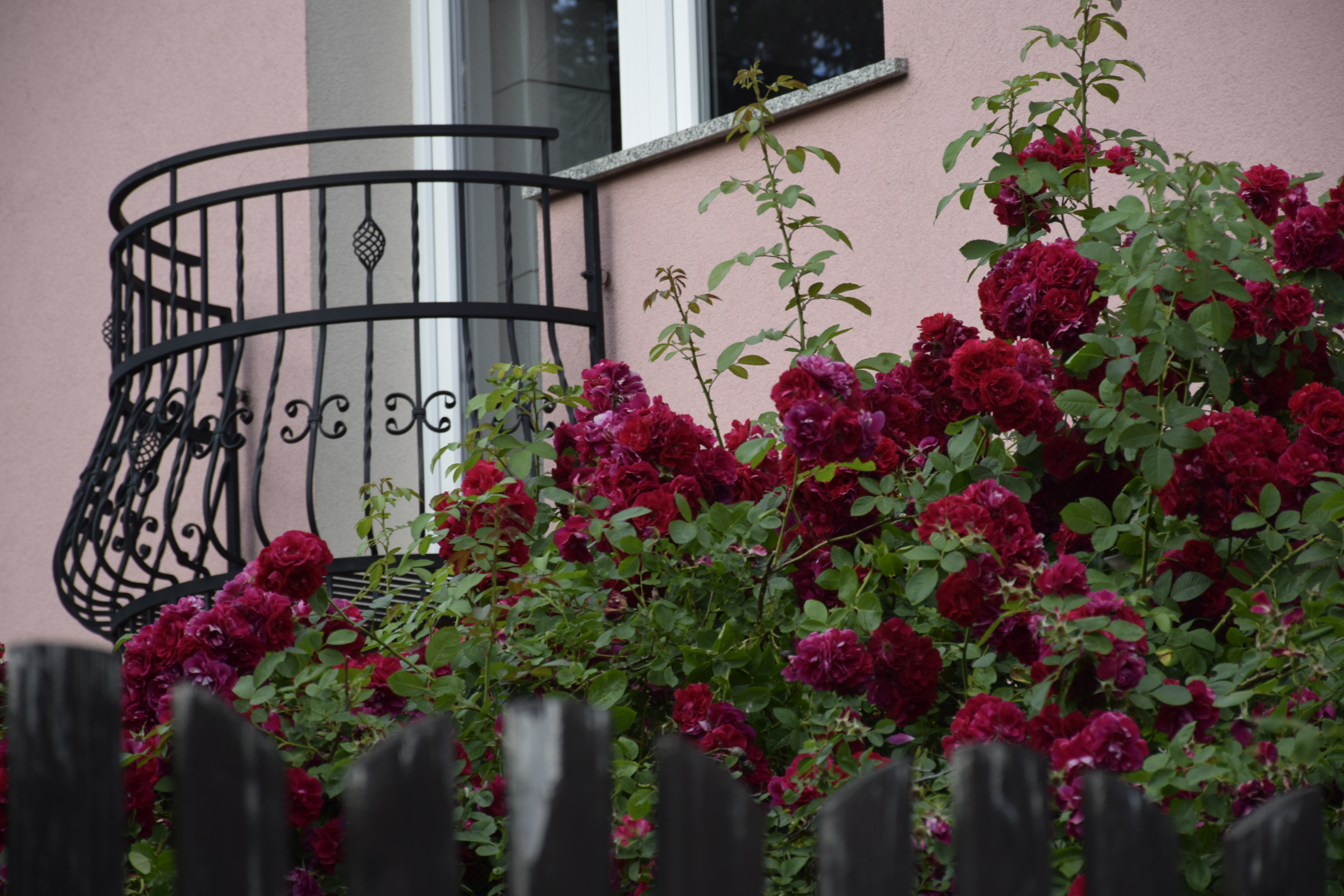
Red roses

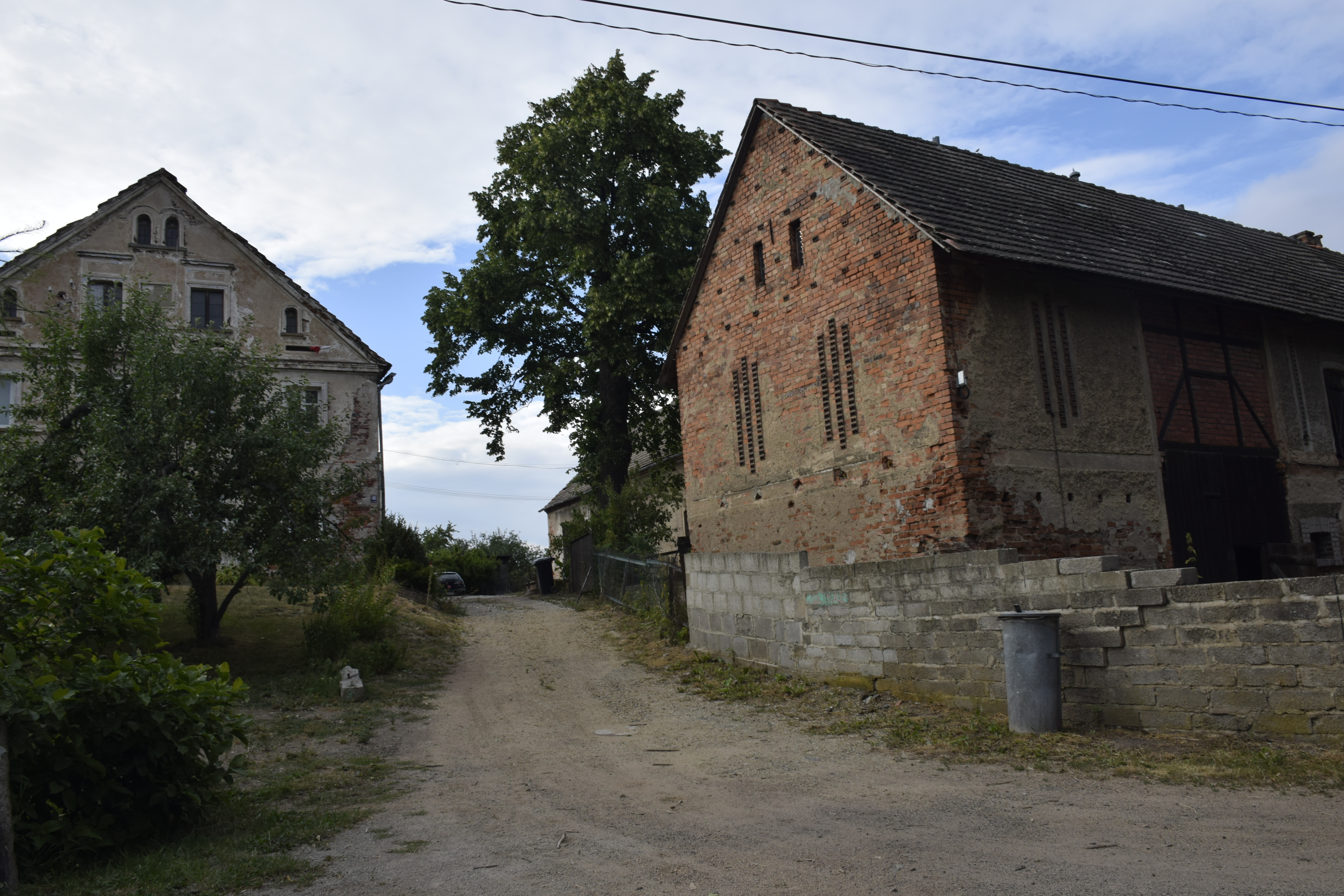
A house and a barn by the road

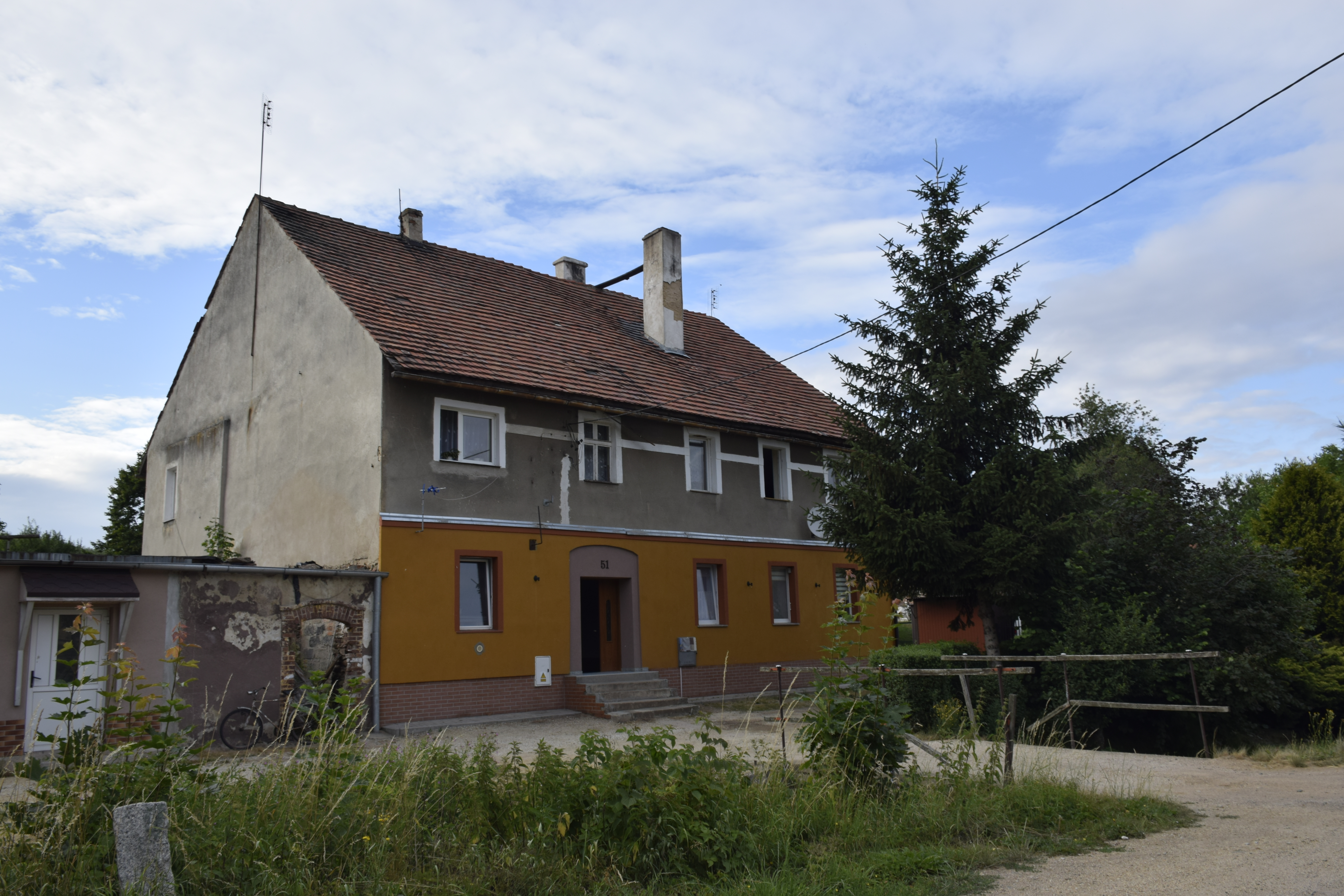
A house

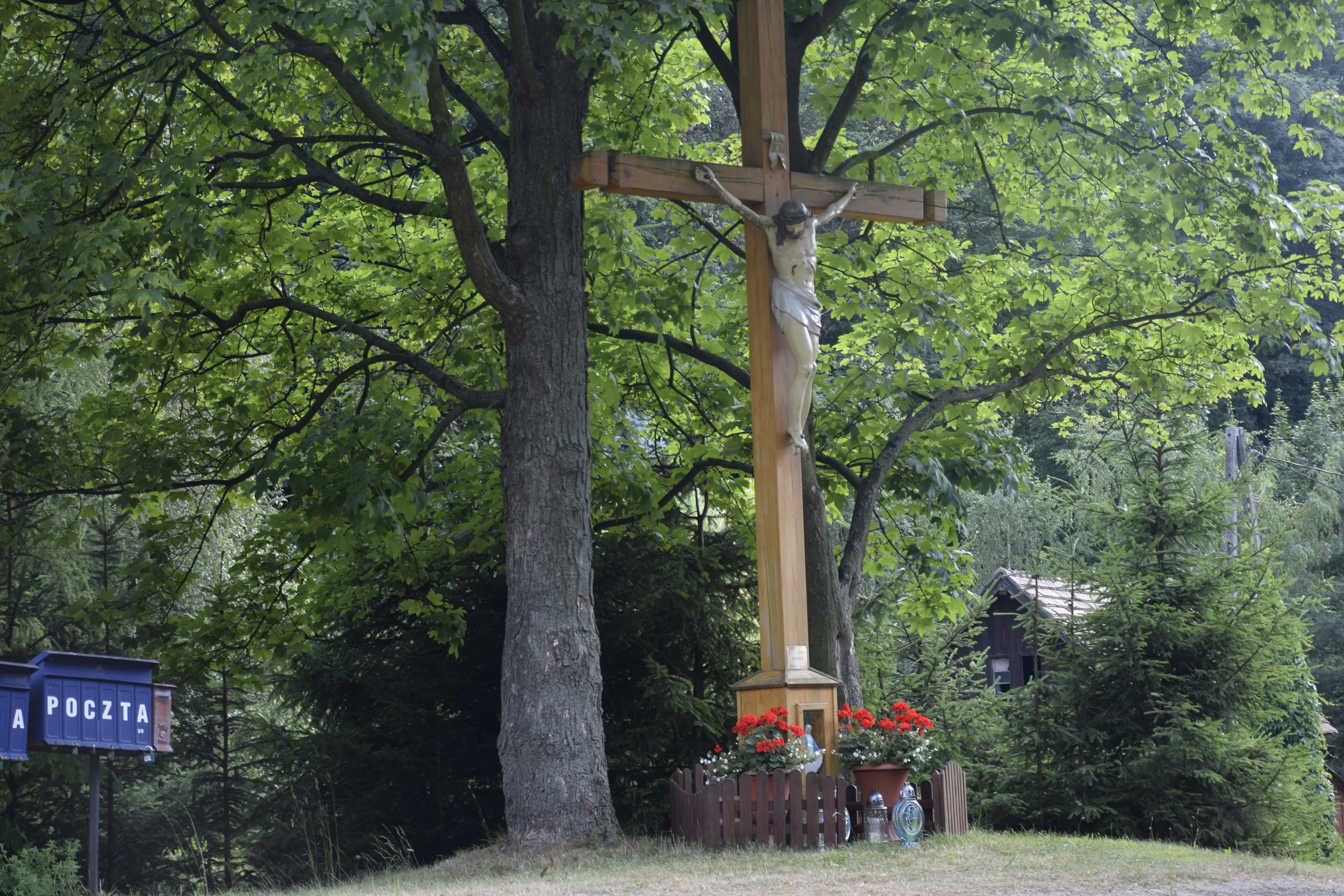
Wooden cross
