= Półwsie =

- Village
- Location within Poland
- Coordinates: 50°54′0″N 16°6′0″E
- Country: Poland
- Voivodeship: Lower Silesian
- Powiat: Jawor
- Gmina: Bolków
- Population: 60

Półwsie [ˈpuu̯fɕɛ] is a village in the administrative district of Gmina Bolków, within Jawor County, Lower Silesian Voivodeship, in south-western Poland.
