= Kaczorów, Lower Silesian Voivodeship =

Kaczorów
- Village
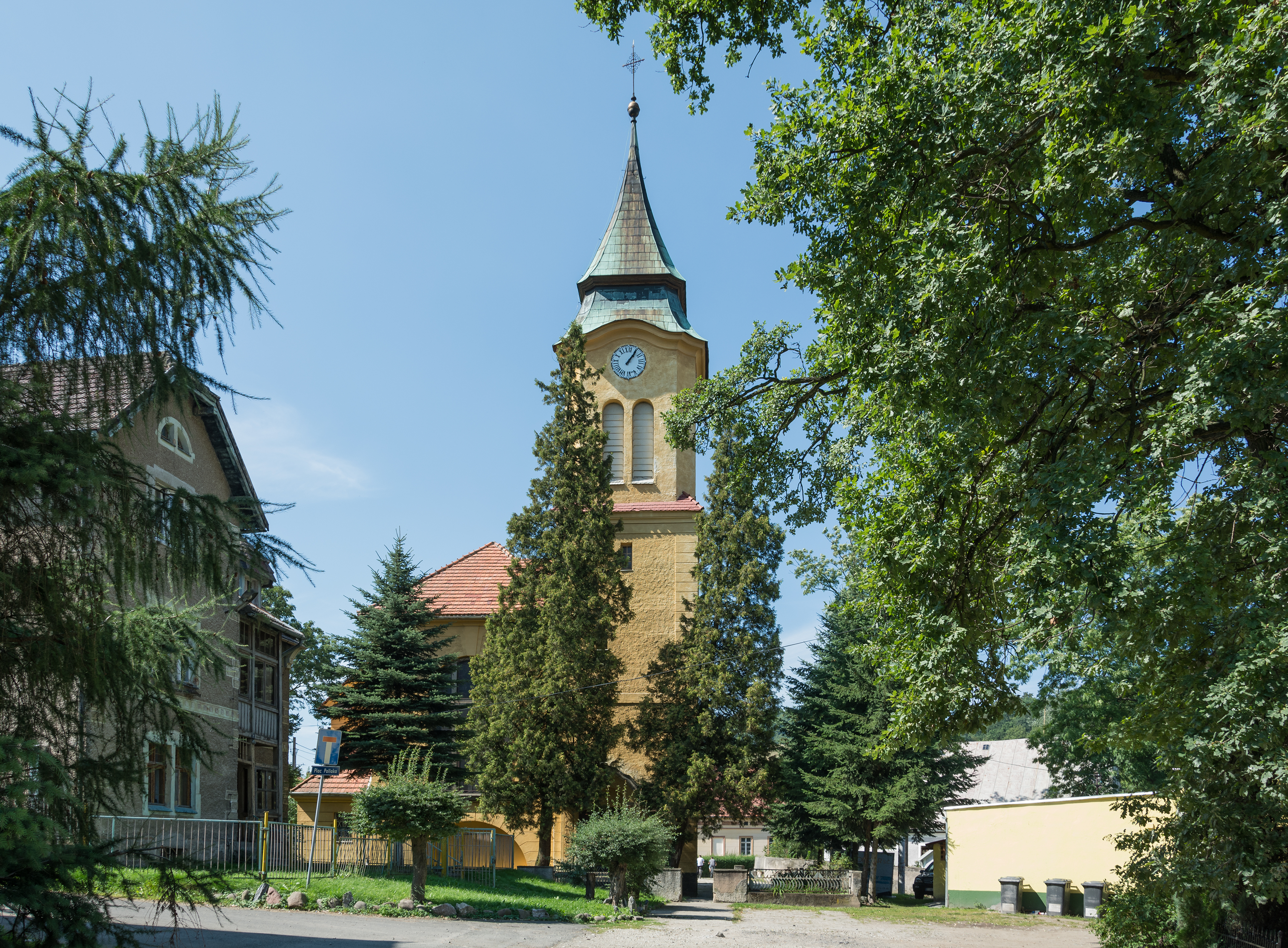

- Location within Poland
- Coordinates: 50°54′37″N 15°56′55″E
- Country: Poland
- Voivodeship: Lower Silesian
- Powiat: Jawor
- Gmina: Bolków
- Population: 712

Kaczorów [kaˈt͡ʂɔruf] is a village in the administrative district of Gmina Bolków, within Jawor County, Lower Silesian Voivodeship, in south-western Poland.
