= Nowe Rochowice =

- Village
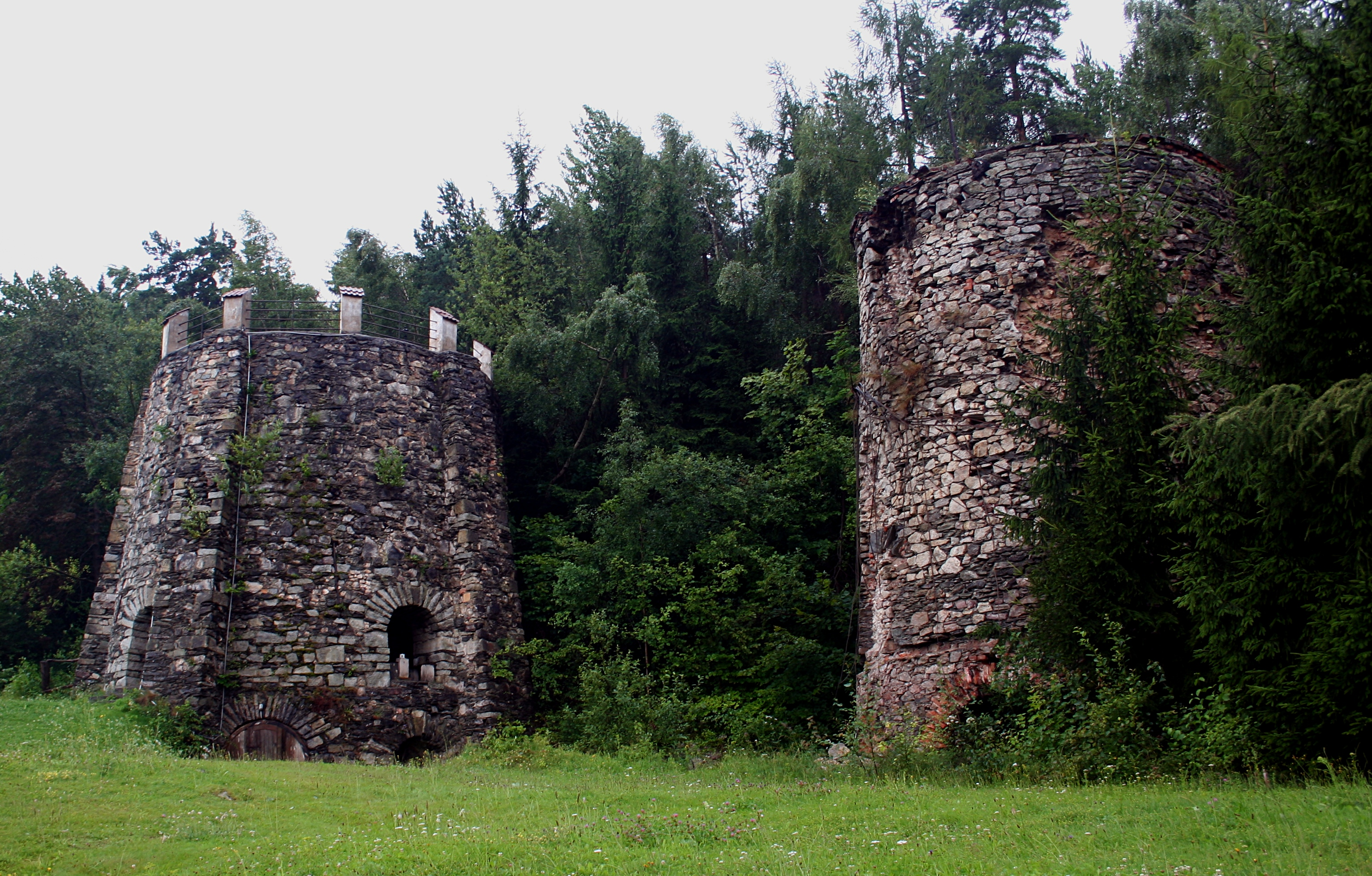

- Location within Poland
- Coordinates: 50°57′00″N 16°03′00″E
- Country: Poland
- Voivodeship: Lower Silesian
- Powiat: Jawor
- Gmina: Bolków

Population
  - Total: 49
- Time zone: UTC+1 (CET)
  - Summer (DST): UTC+2 (CEST)
- Vehicle registration: DJA

Nowe Rochowice [ˈnɔvɛ rɔxɔˈvit͡sɛ] is a village in the administrative district of Gmina Bolków, within Jawor County, Lower Silesian Voivodeship, in south-western Poland.
