= Wierzchosławice, Lower Silesian Voivodeship =

Wierzchosławice
- Village
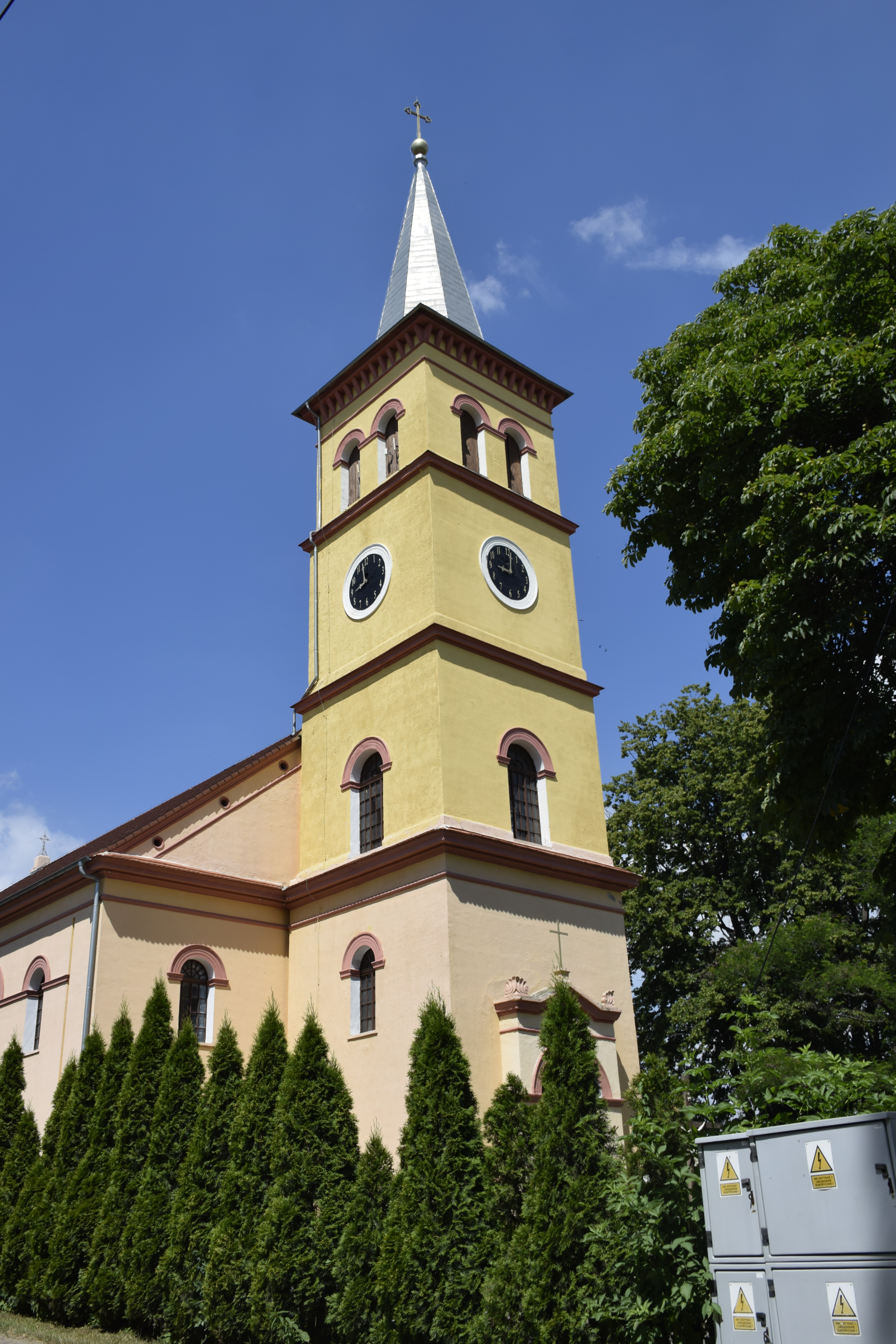
- Church

- Location within Poland
- Coordinates: 50°54′0″N 16°6′0″E
- Country: Poland
- Voivodeship: Lower Silesian
- Powiat: Jawor
- Gmina: Bolków
- Elevation: 345 m (1,132 ft)
- Population: 870
- Time zone: UTC+1 (CET)
  - Summer (DST): UTC+2 (CEST)
- Vehicle registration: DJA

Wierzchosławice [vjɛʂxɔswaˈvit͡sɛ] is a village in the administrative district of Gmina Bolków, within Jawor County, Lower Silesian Voivodeship, in south-western Poland.

== Gallery ==
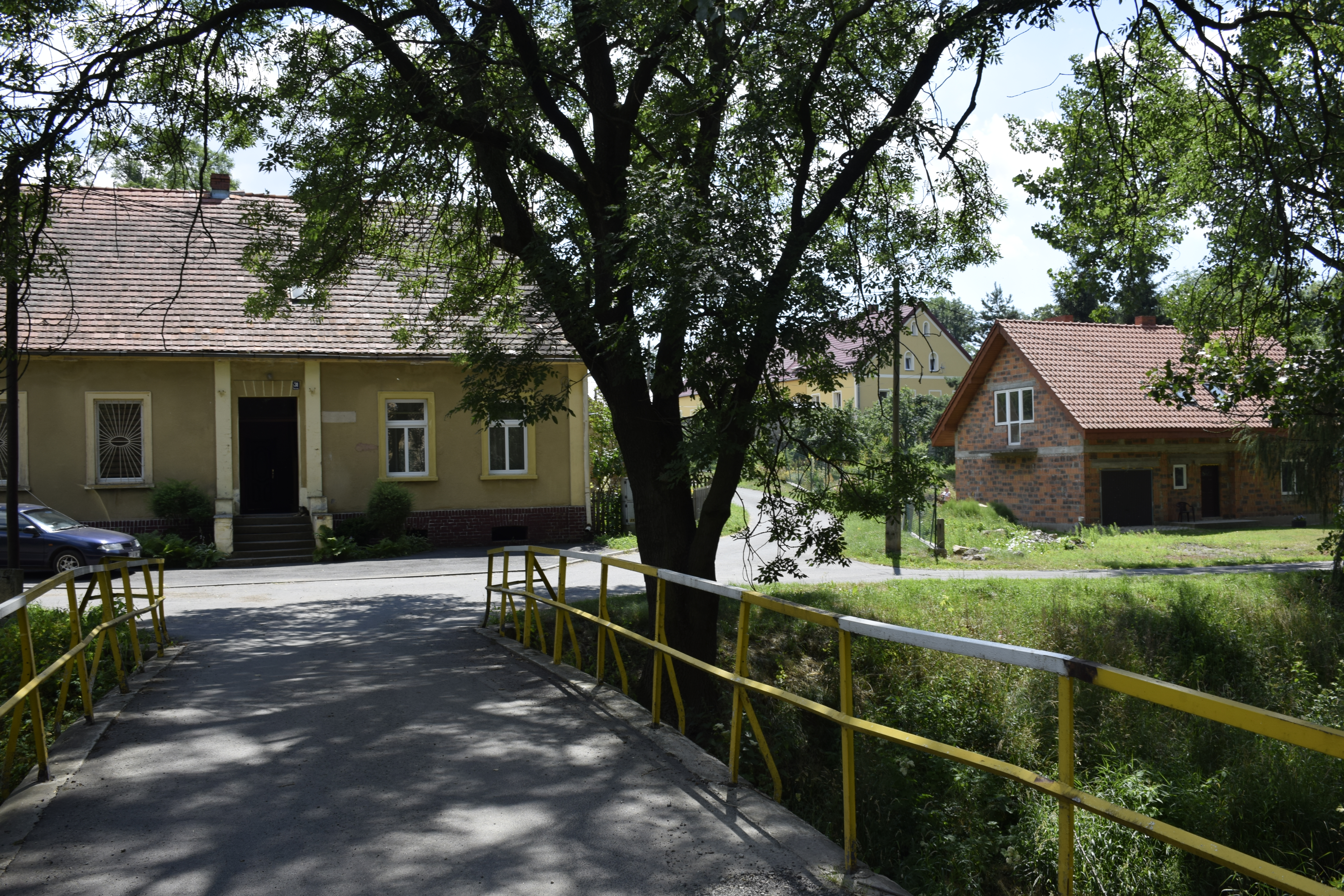
Houses over the bridge

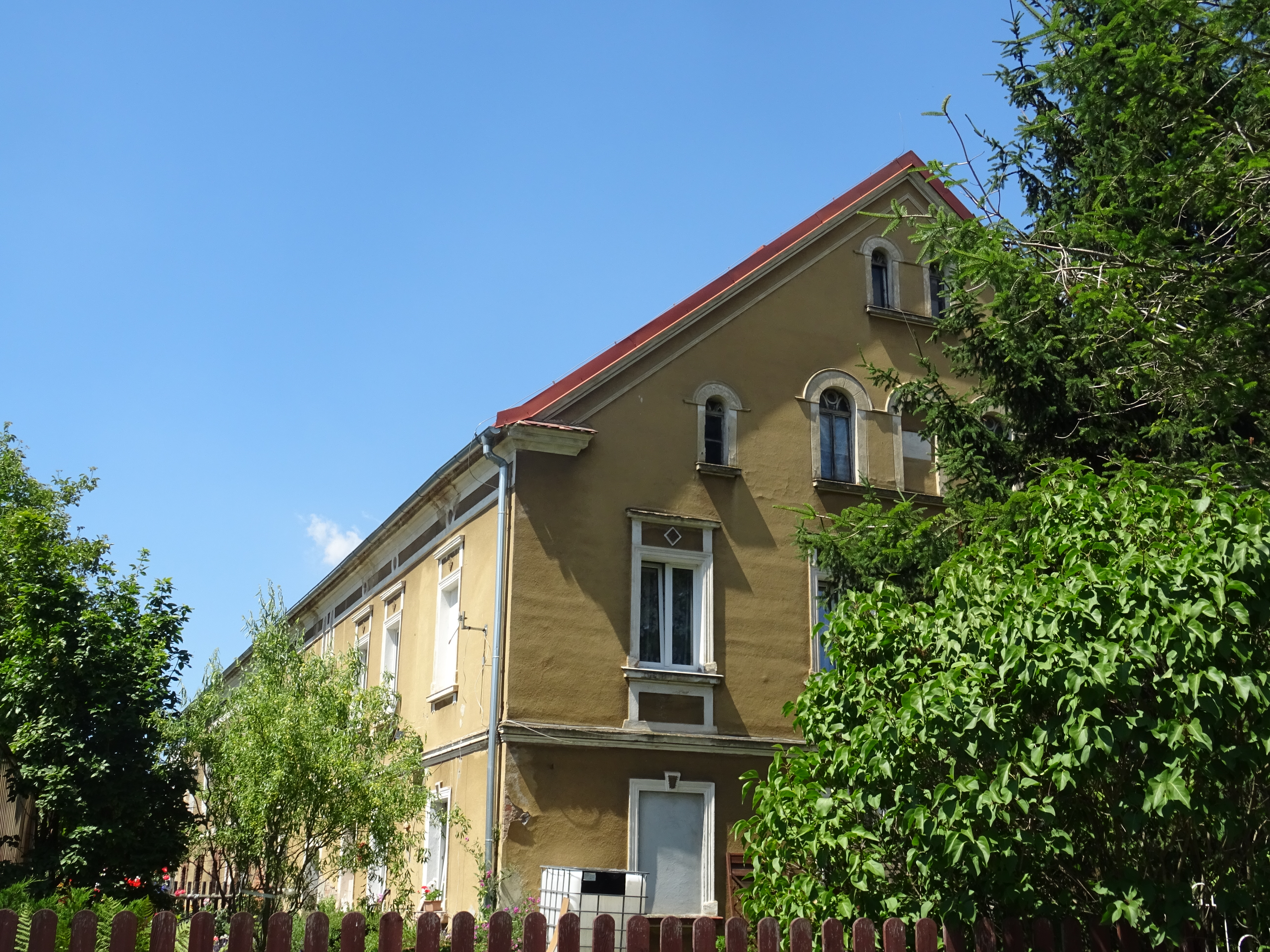
Yellow house

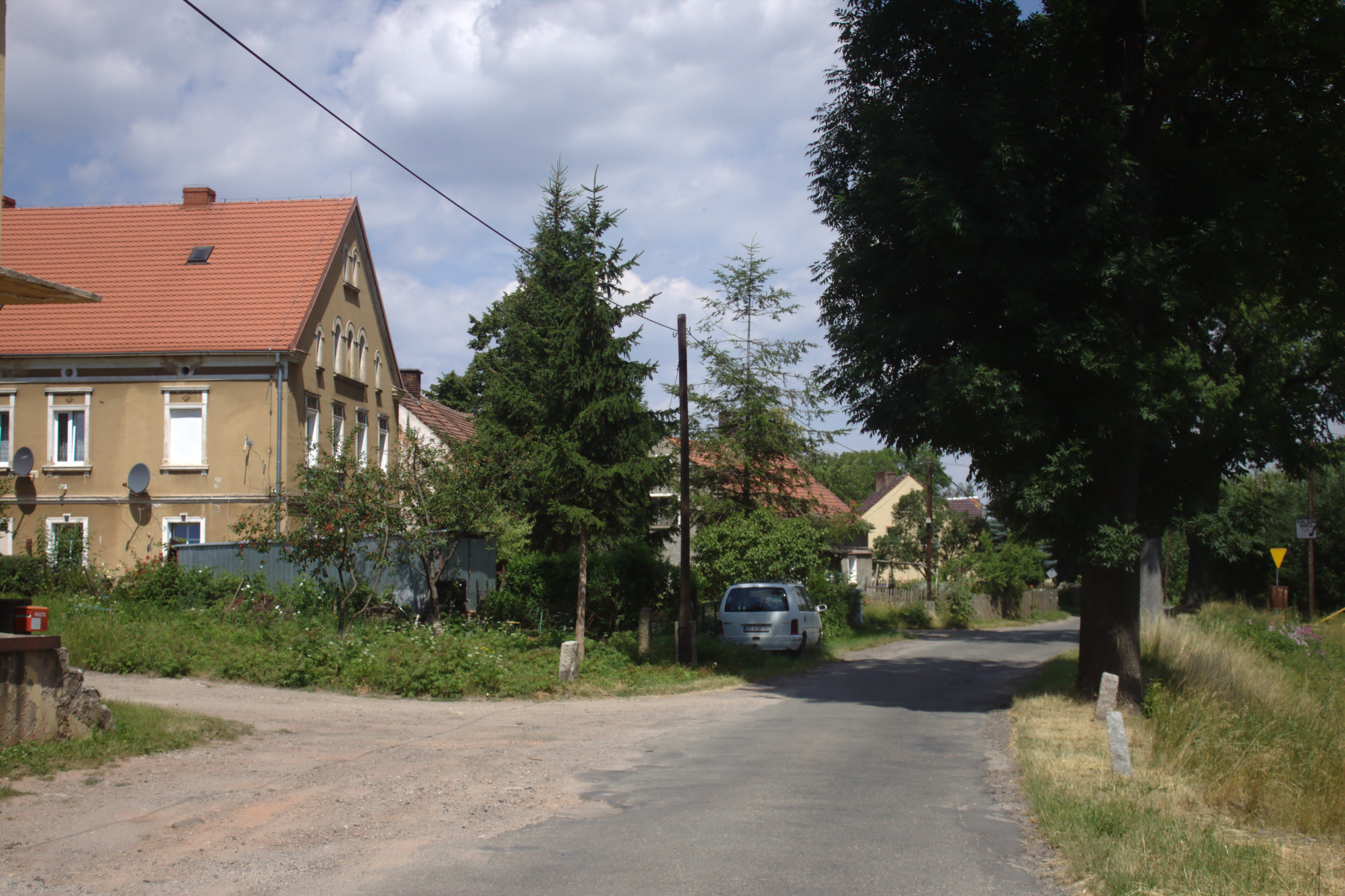
Houses by the road

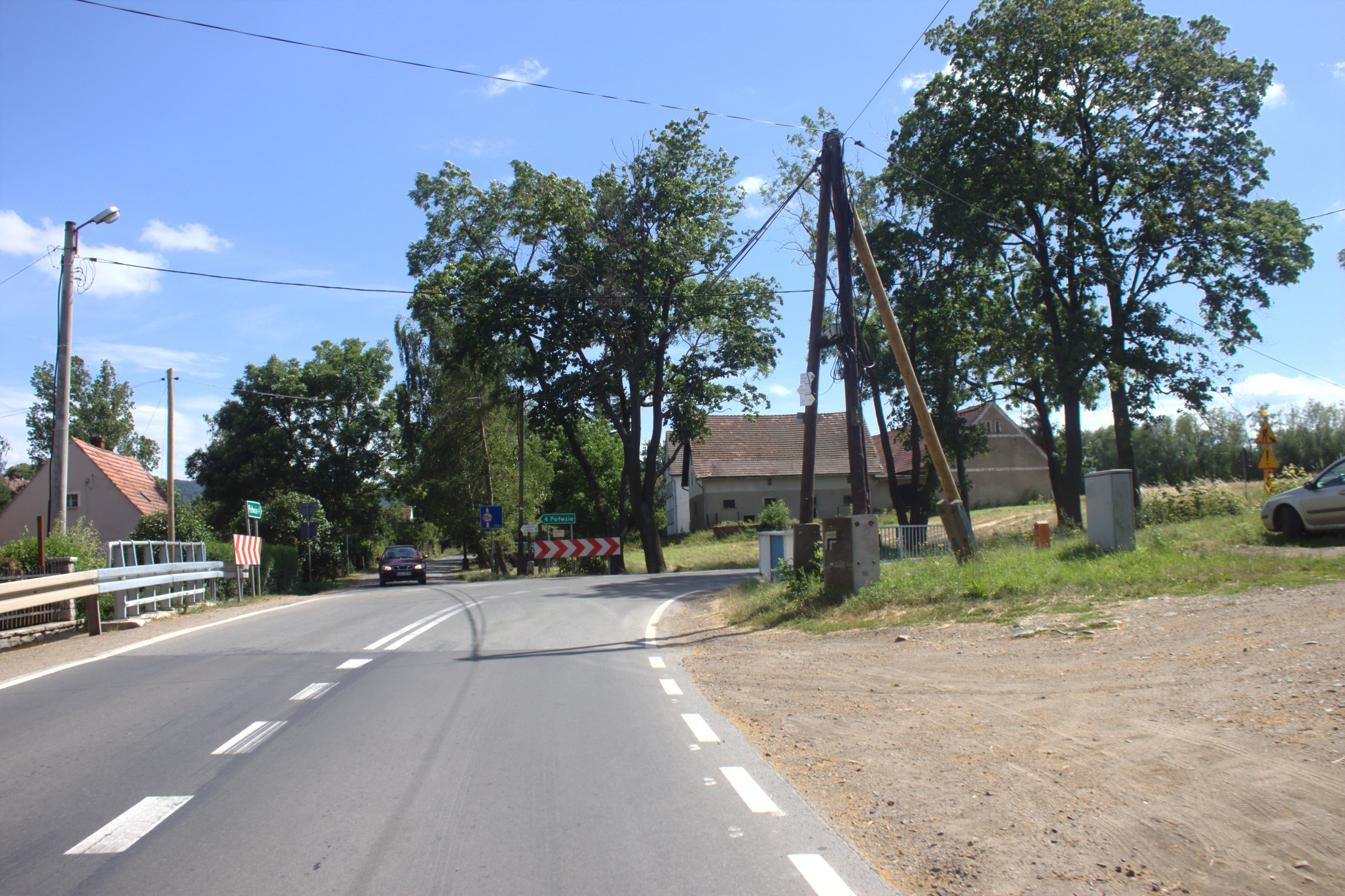
Crossroads
