= Jastrowiec =

- Village
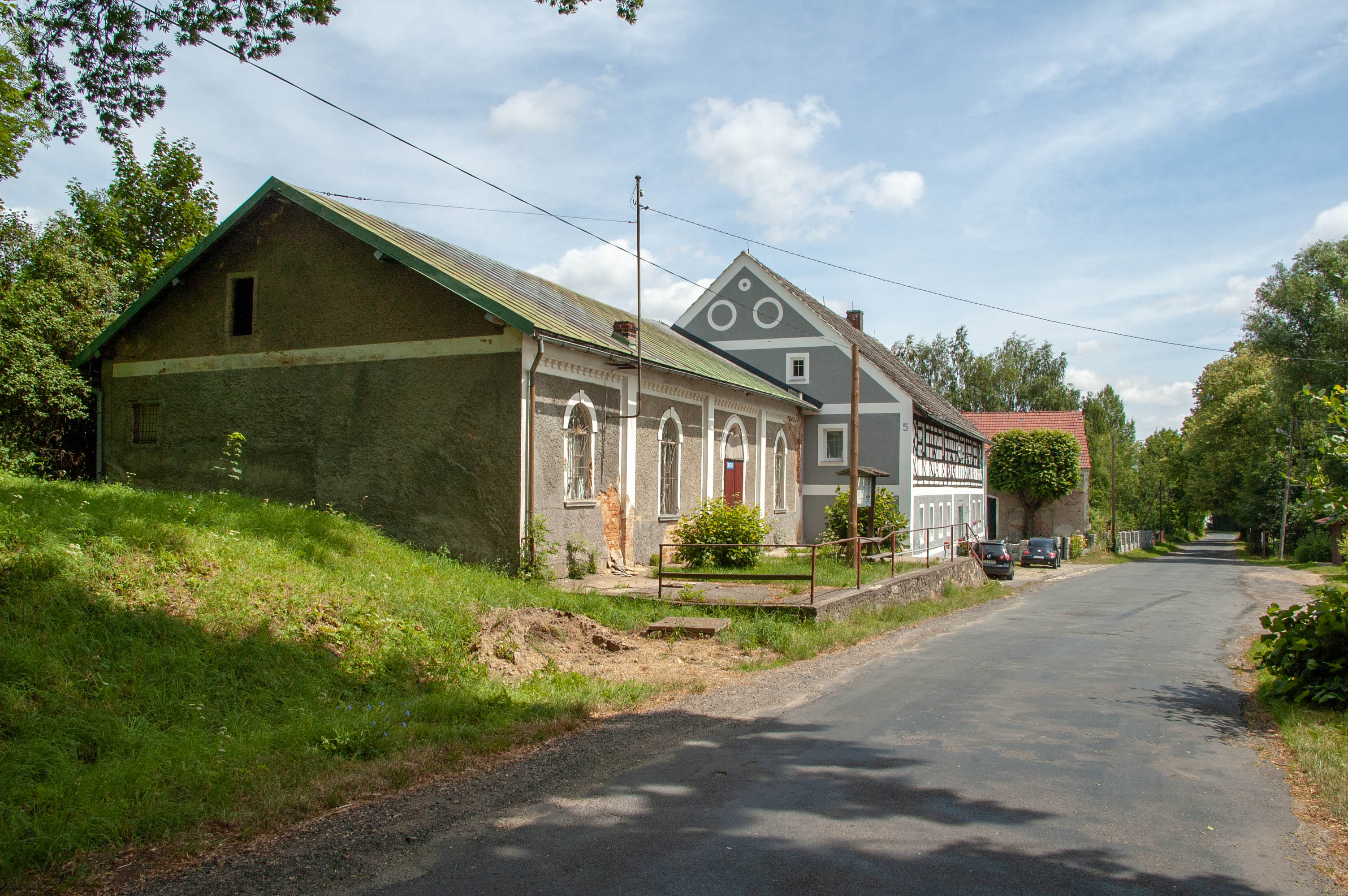
- Houses by the road

- Location within Poland
- Coordinates: 50°57′6″N 16°5′0″E
- Country: Poland
- Voivodeship: Lower Silesian
- Powiat: Jawor
- Gmina: Bolków
- Highest elevation: 340 m (1,120 ft)
- Population: 163
- Website: http://www.jastrowiec.ovh.org

Jastrowiec [jasˈtrɔvjɛt͡s] is a village in the administrative district of Gmina Bolków, within Jawor County, Lower Silesian Voivodeship, in south-western Poland.

== Gallery ==
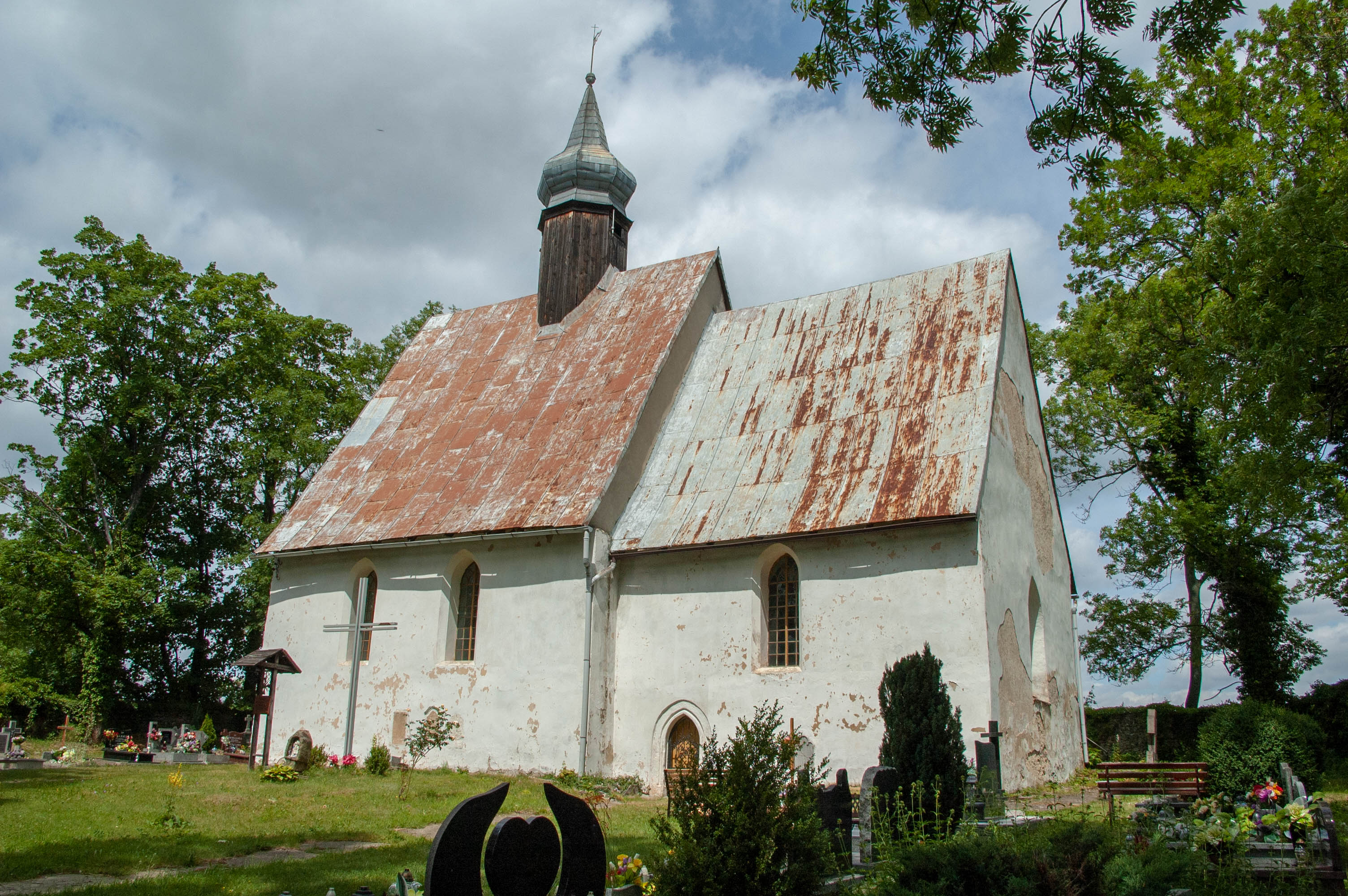
Church

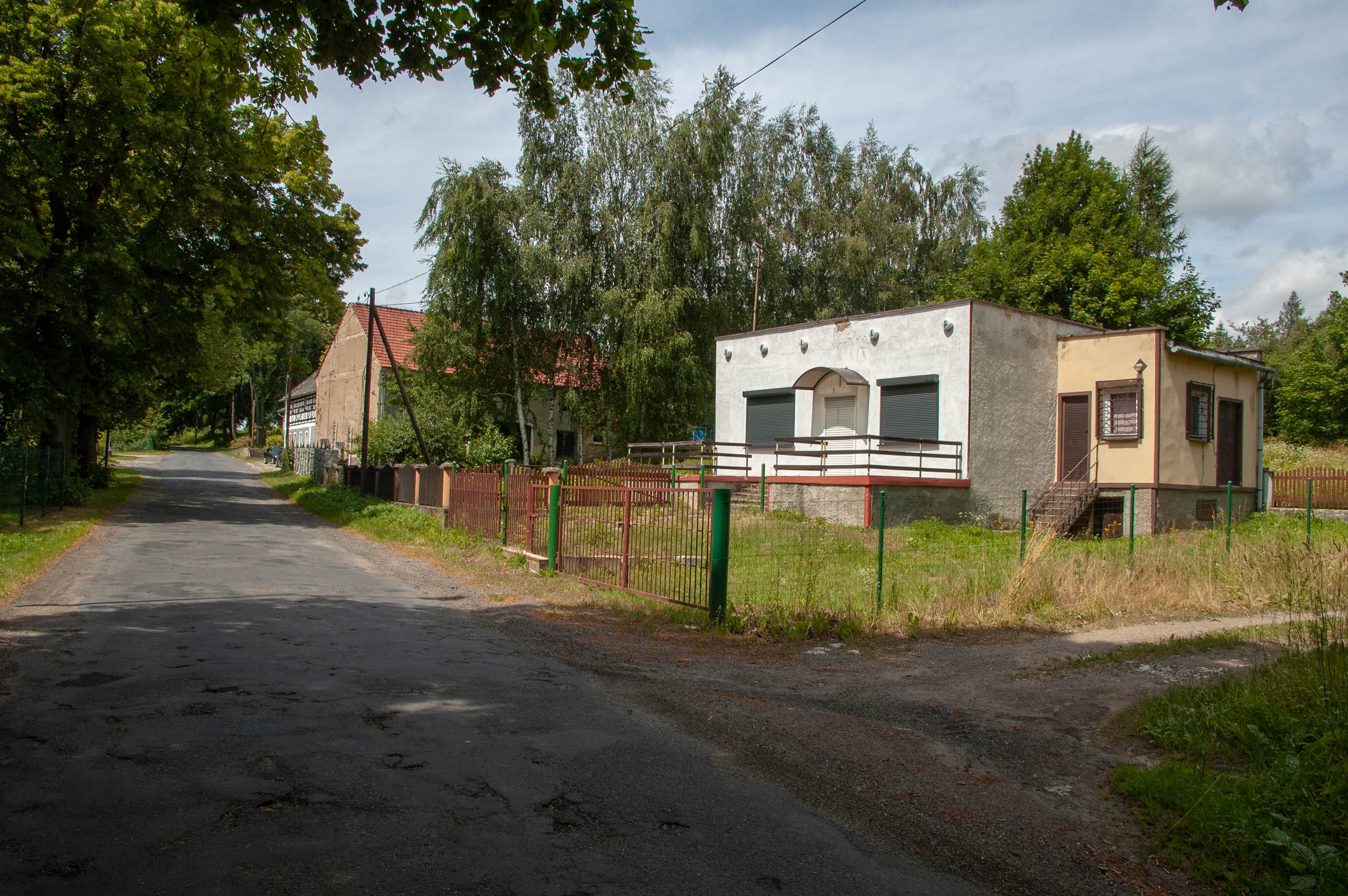
Houses by the road

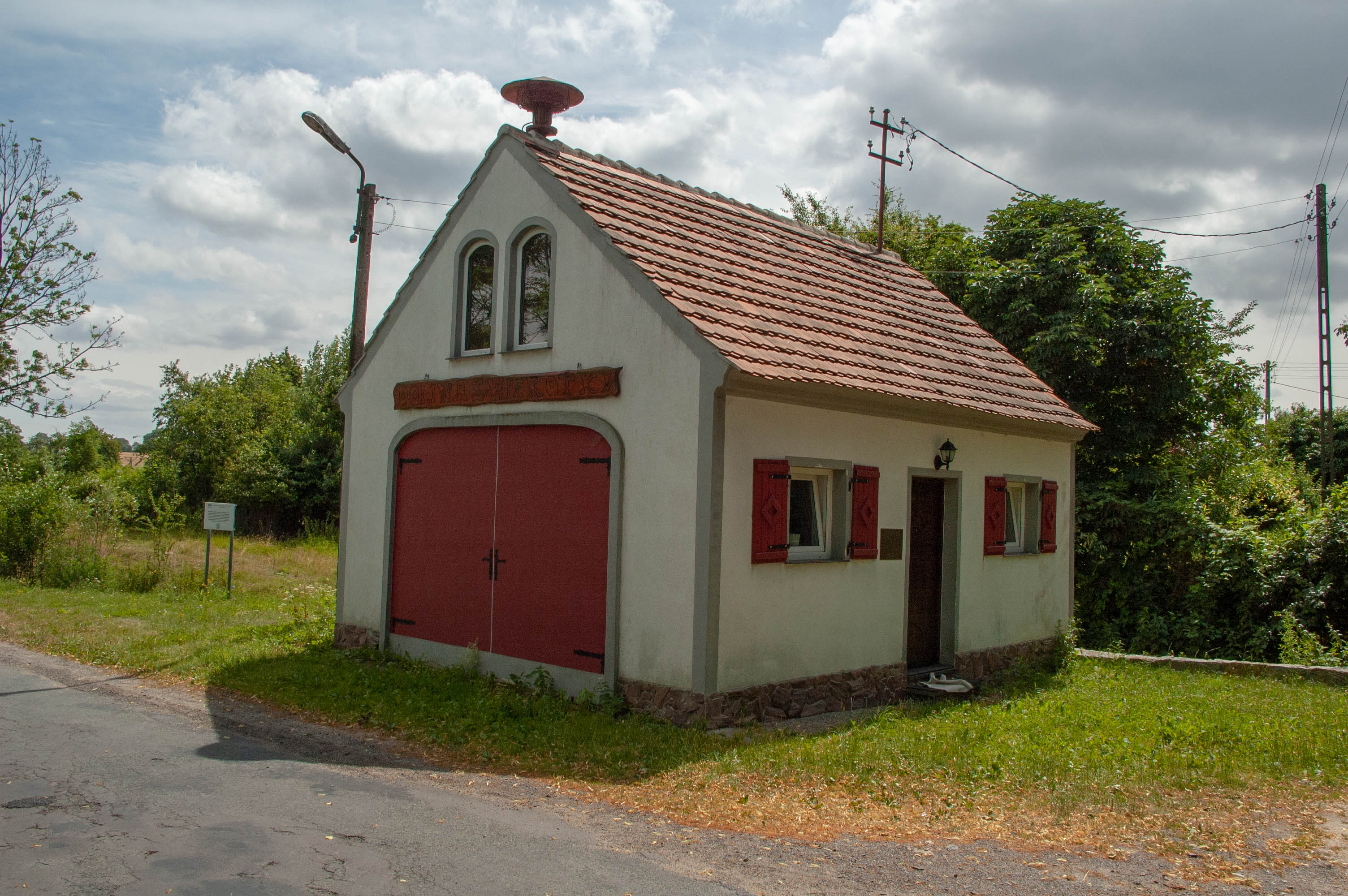
Fire station
