= Mysłów, Lower Silesian Voivodeship =

Mysłów
- Village
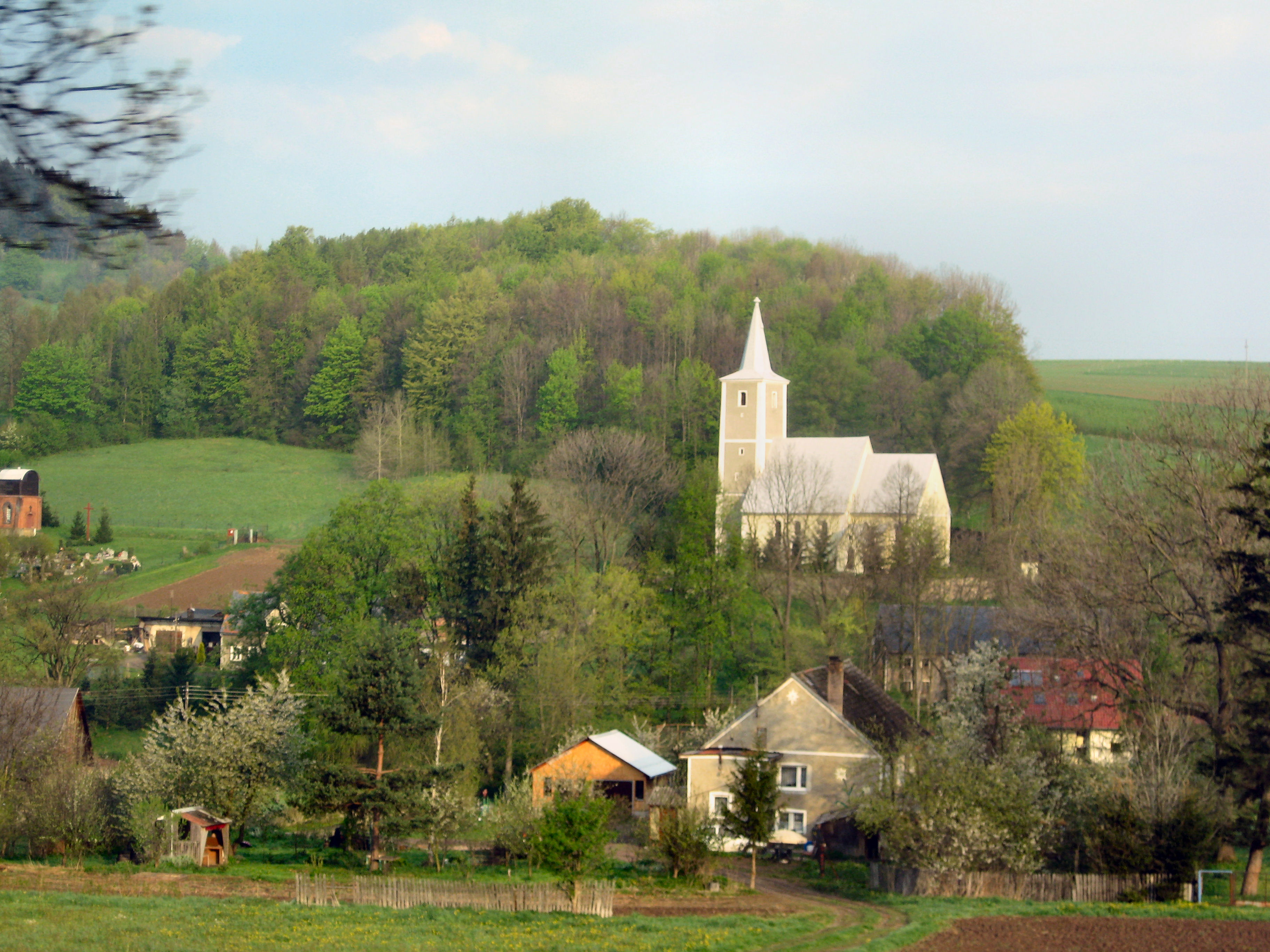
- Church of Saint John the Baptist

- Location within Poland
- Coordinates: 50°55′48″N 15°57′59″E
- Country: Poland
- Voivodeship: Lower Silesian
- County: Jawor
- Gmina: Bolków
- Highest elevation: 500 m (1,600 ft)

Population
  - Total: 623

Mysłów [ˈmɨswuf] is a village in the administrative district of Gmina Bolków, within Jawor County, Lower Silesian Voivodeship, in south-western Poland.
