= Wolbromek =

- Village
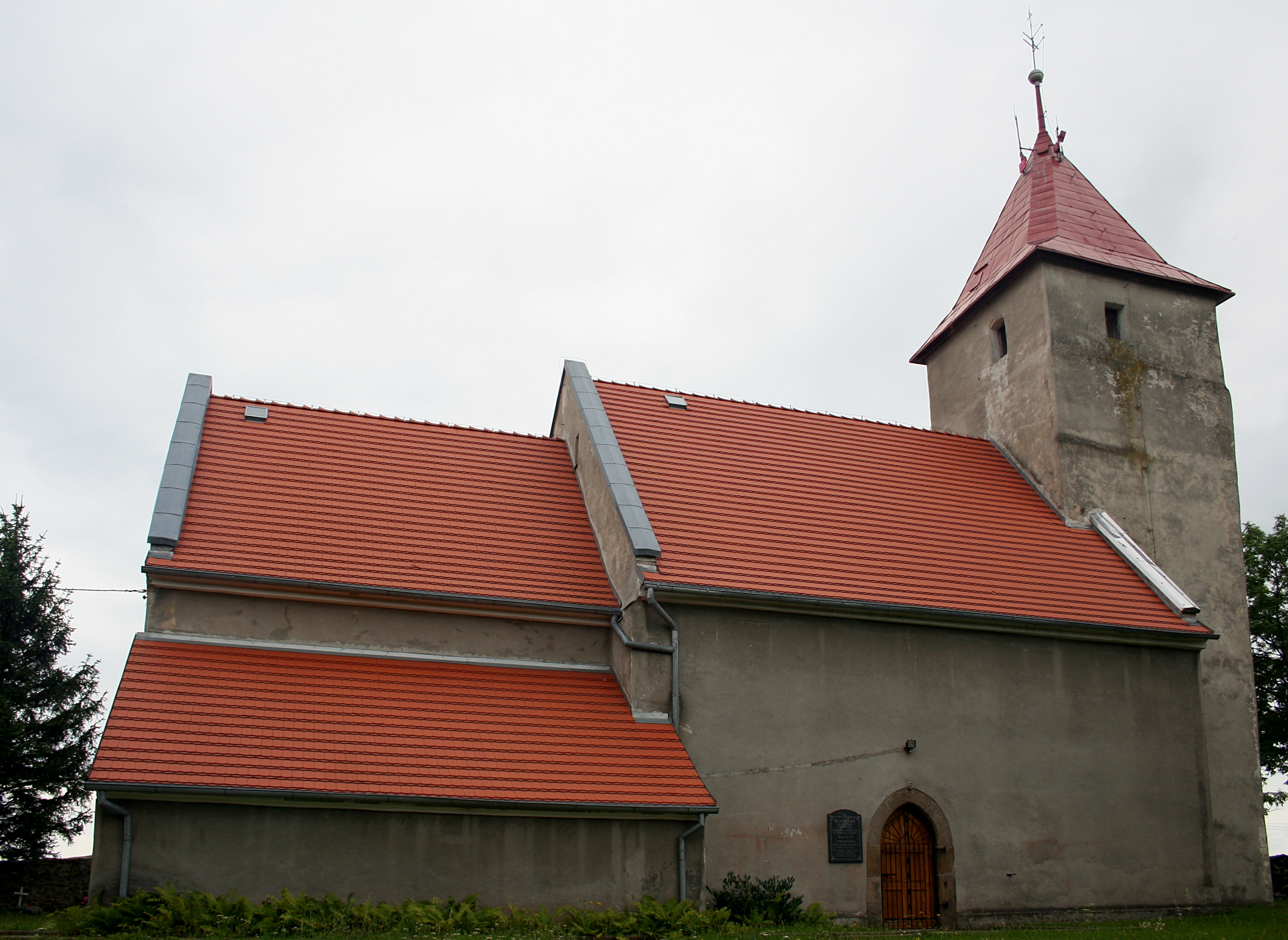
- Church of Saint Barbara

- Location within Poland
- Coordinates: 50°56′00″N 16°10′00″E
- Country: Poland
- Voivodeship: Lower Silesian
- County: Jawor
- Gmina: Bolków
- Highest elevation: 290 m (950 ft)
- Population: 573

Wolbromek [vɔlˈbrɔmɛk] is a village in the administrative district of Gmina Bolków, in Jawor County, Lower Silesian Voivodeship, in south-western Poland.

== Gallery ==
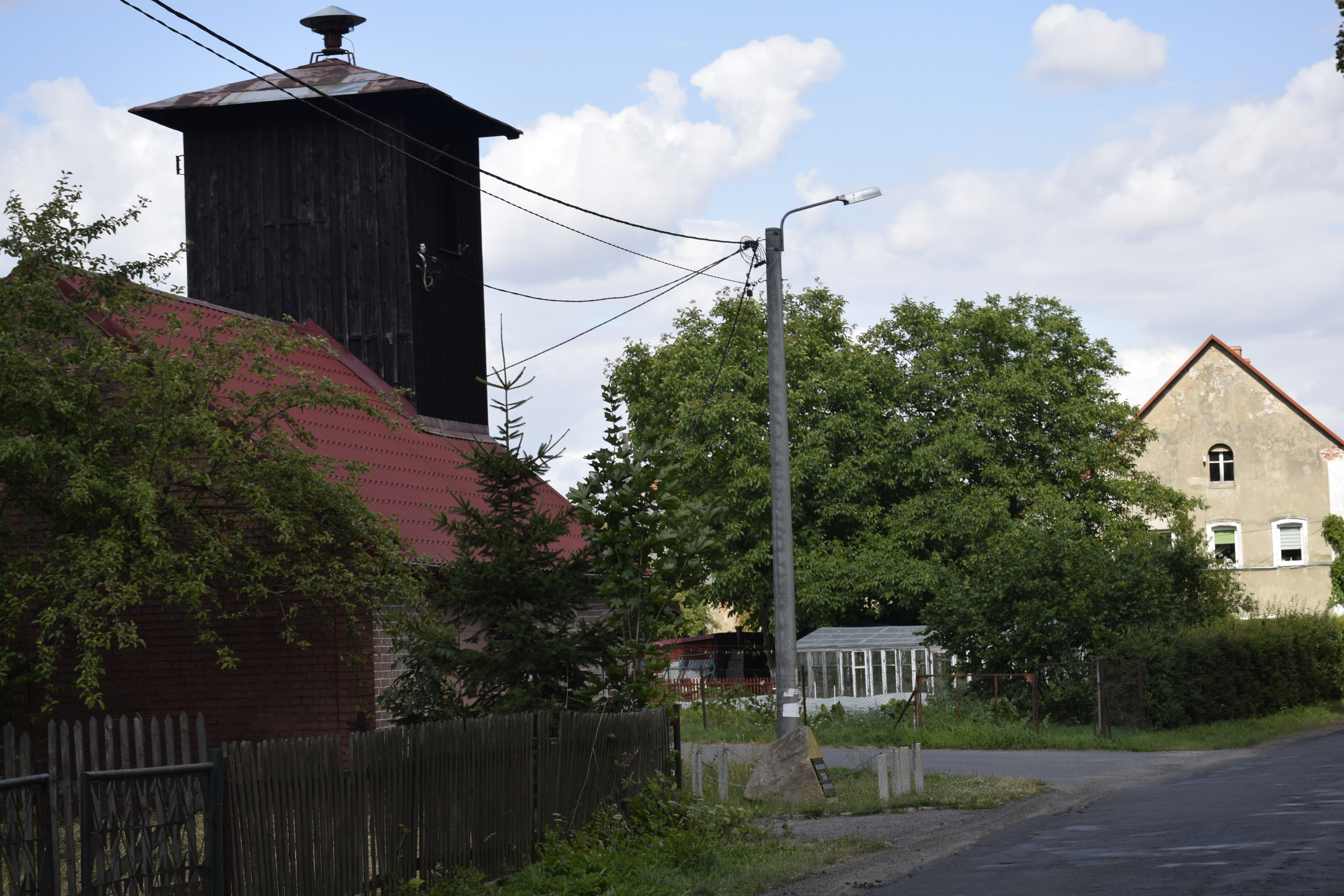
Fire station (left)

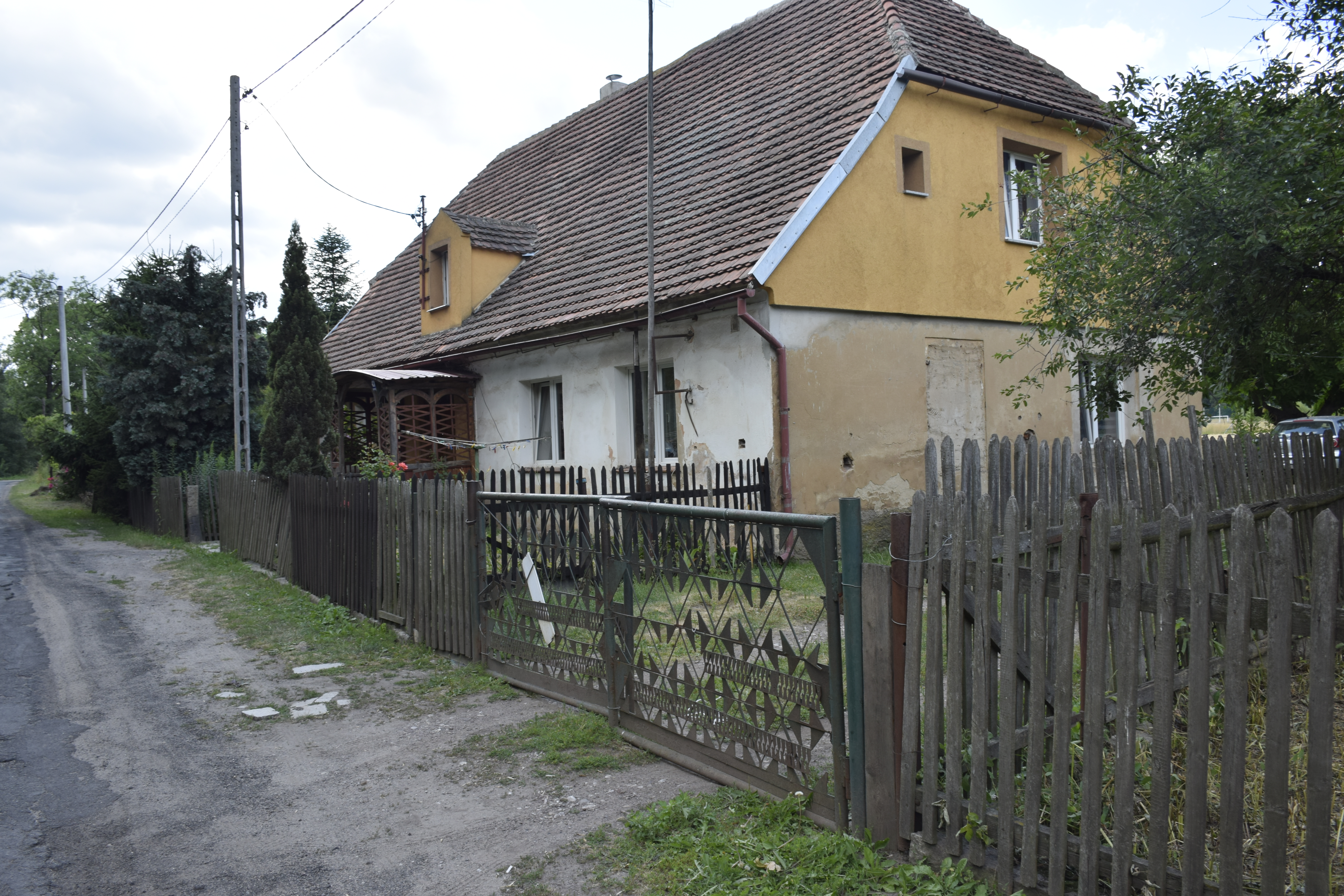
House

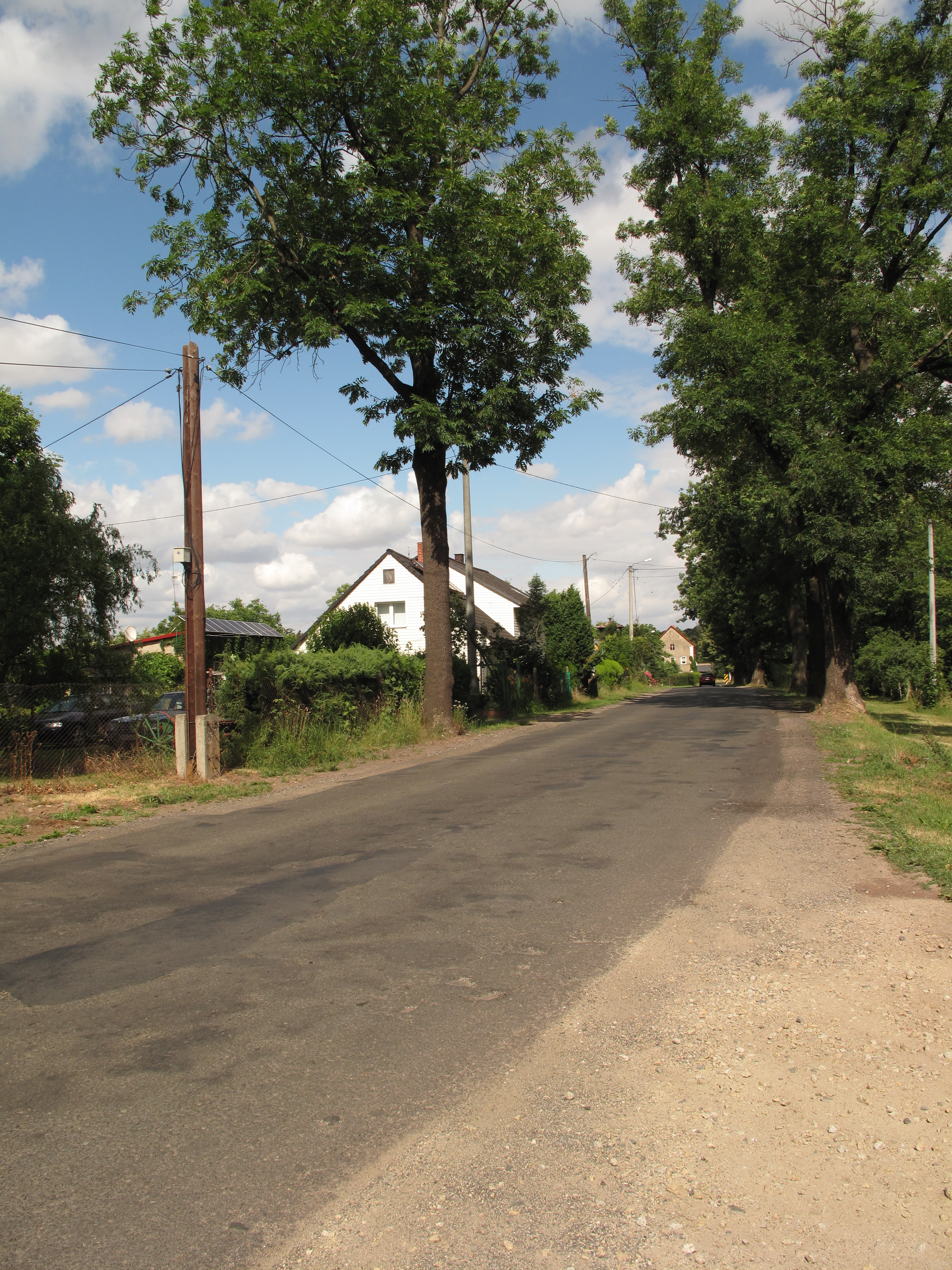
Road
