= Radzimowice, Lower Silesian Voivodeship =

Radzimowice
- Village
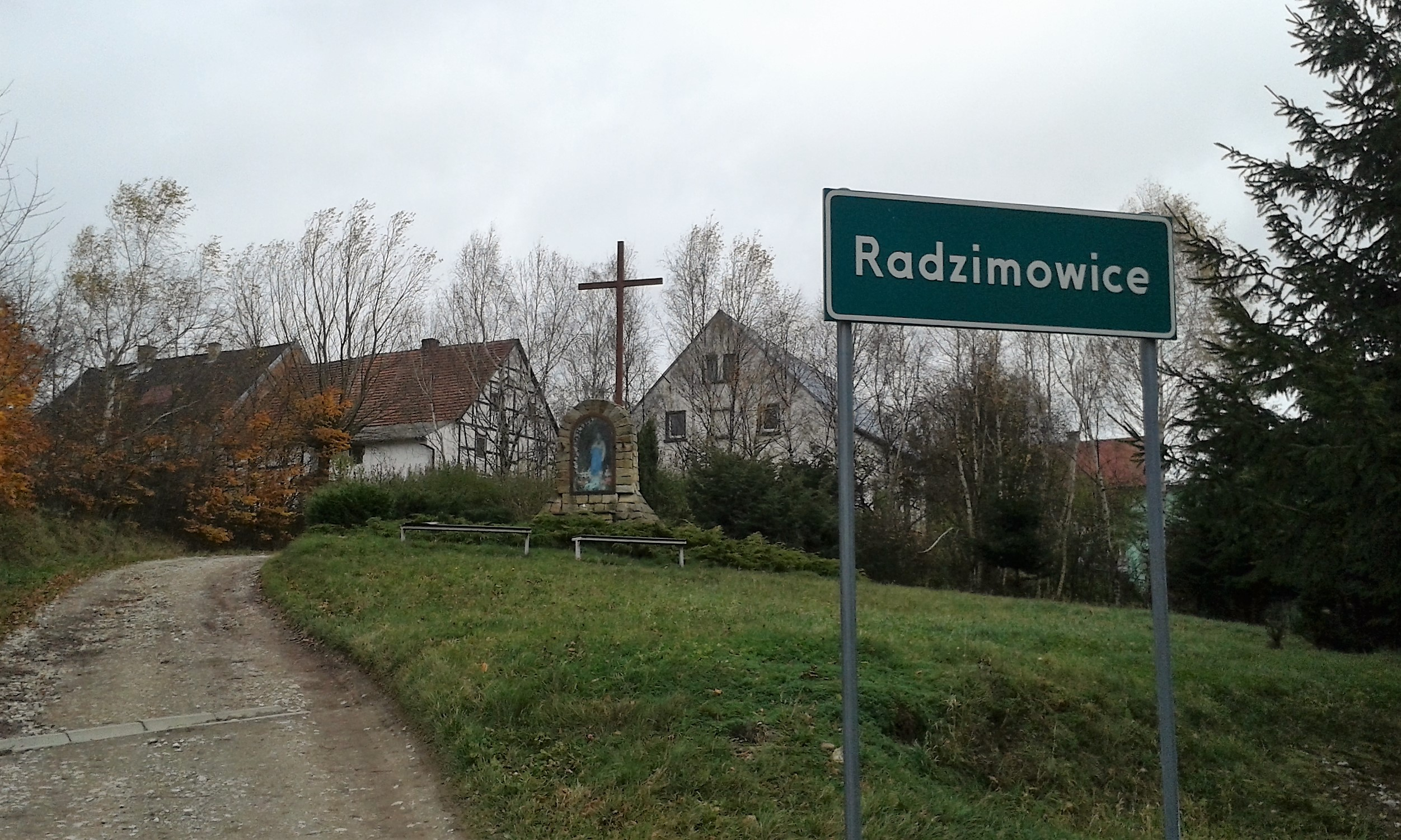

- Location within Poland
- Coordinates: 50°56′25″N 15°57′43″E
- Country: Poland
- Voivodeship: Lower Silesian
- Powiat: Jawor
- Gmina: Bolków

Radzimowice [rad͡ʑimɔˈvit͡sɛ] is a village in the administrative district of Gmina Bolków, within Jawor County, Lower Silesian Voivodeship, in south-western Poland.
