= Gorzanowice =

- Village
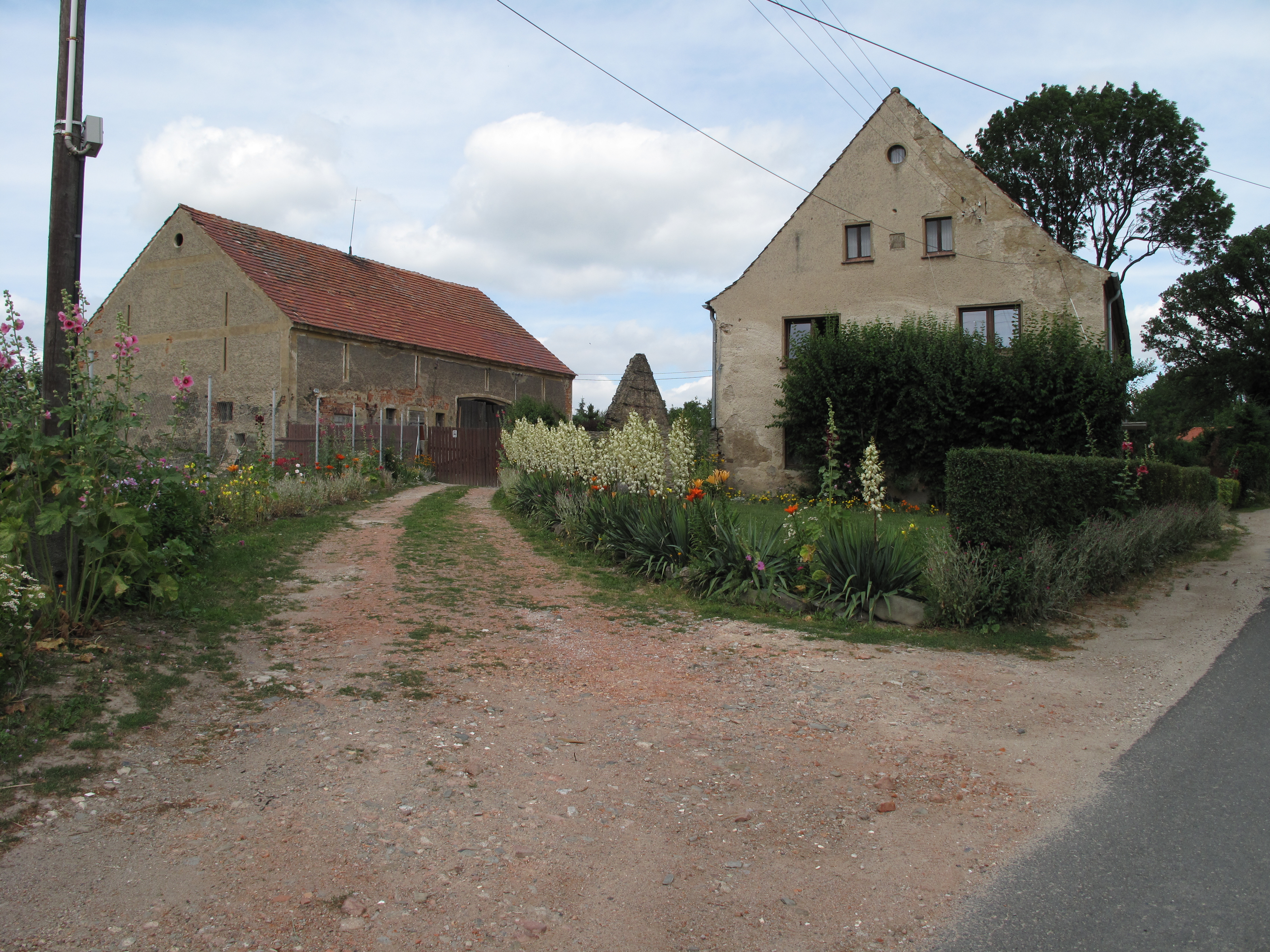
- A farm

- Location within Poland
- Coordinates: 50°56′39″N 16°04′53″E
- Country: Poland
- Voivodeship: Lower Silesian
- Powiat: Jawor
- Gmina: Bolków
- Highest elevation: 454 m (1,490 ft)
- Population: 73

Gorzanowice [ɡɔʐanɔˈvit͡sɛ] is a village in the administrative district of Gmina Bolków, within Jawor County, Lower Silesian Voivodeship, in south-western Poland.

== Gallery ==
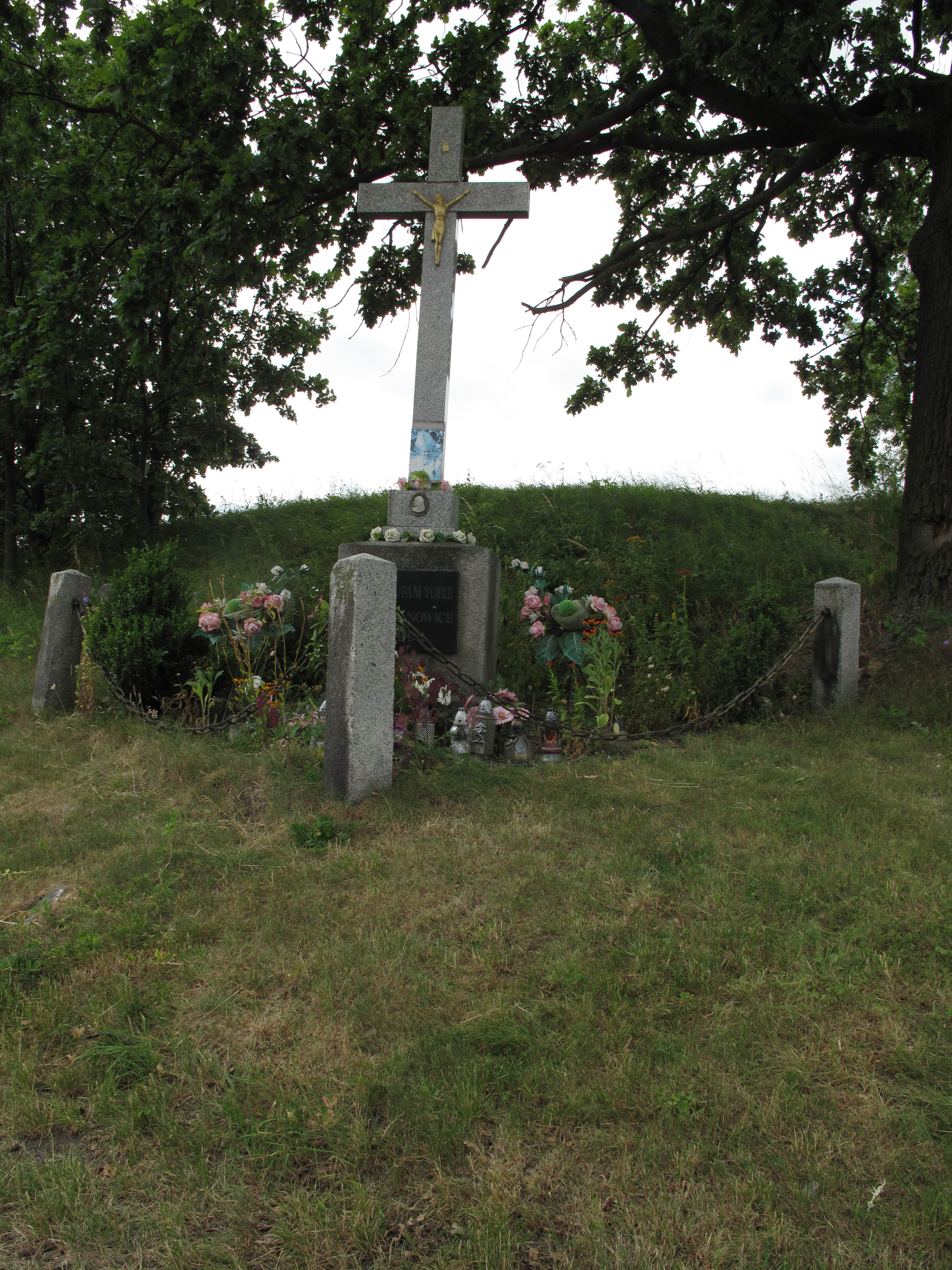
Cross

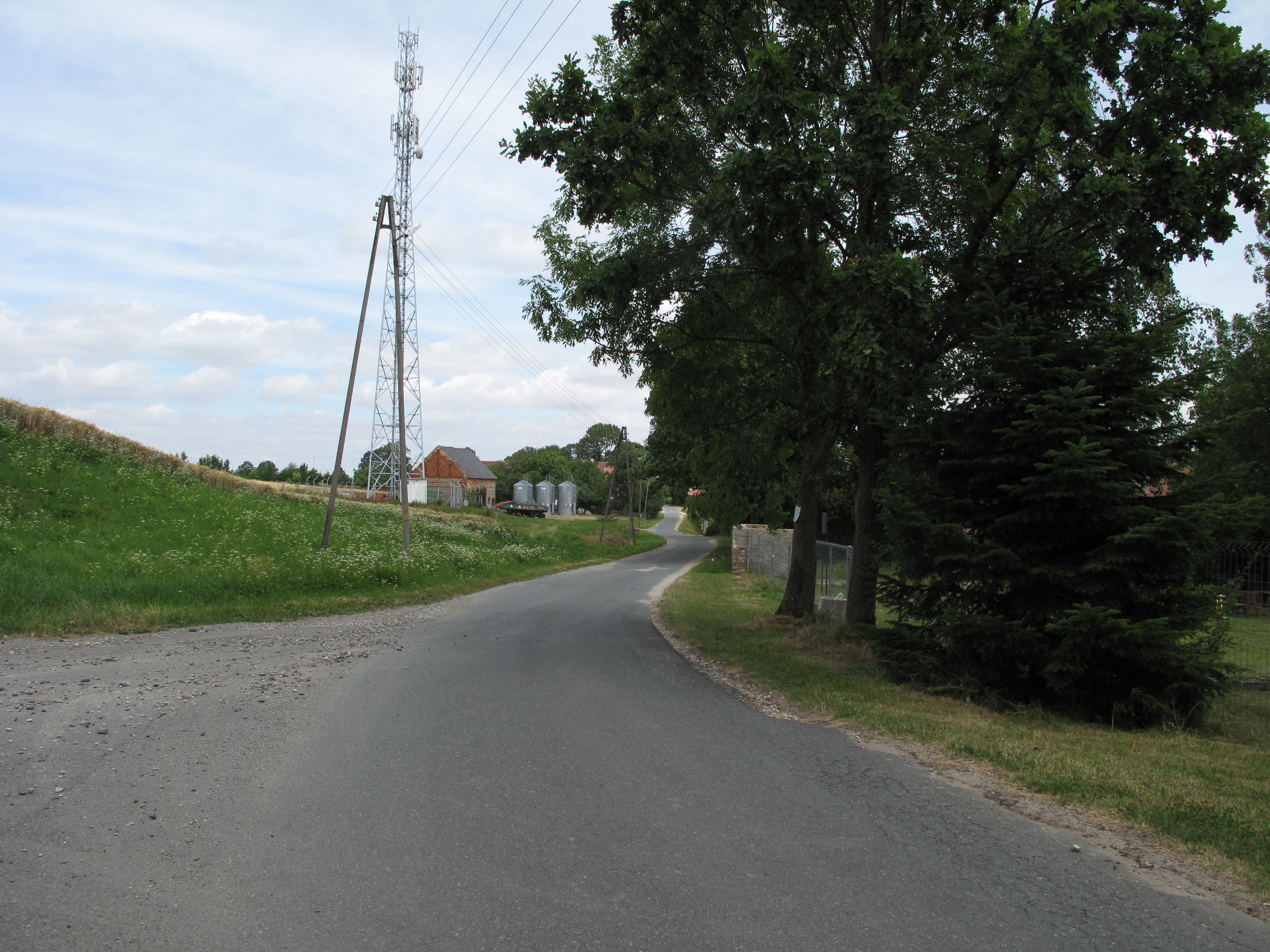
Road

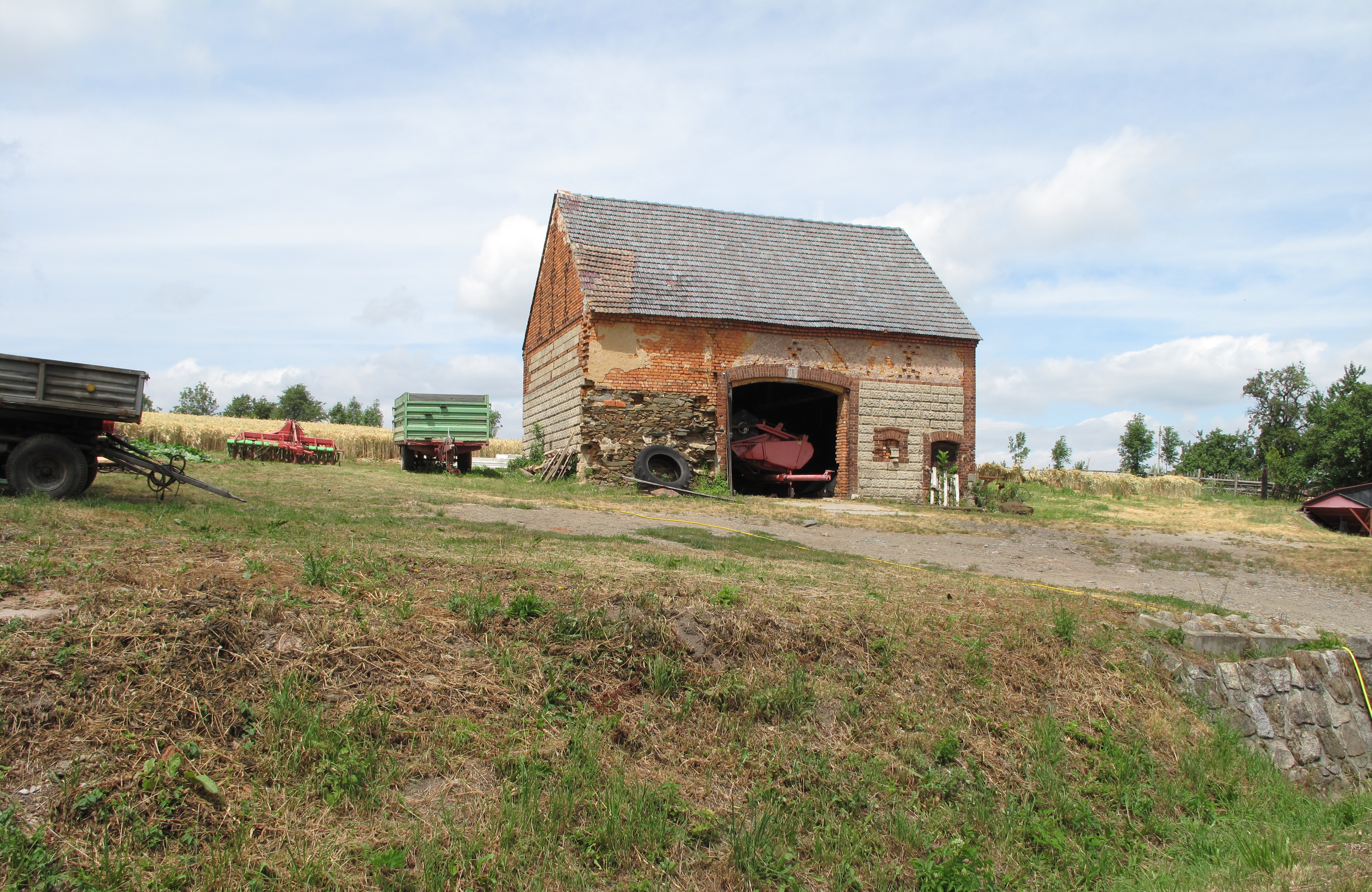
Barn

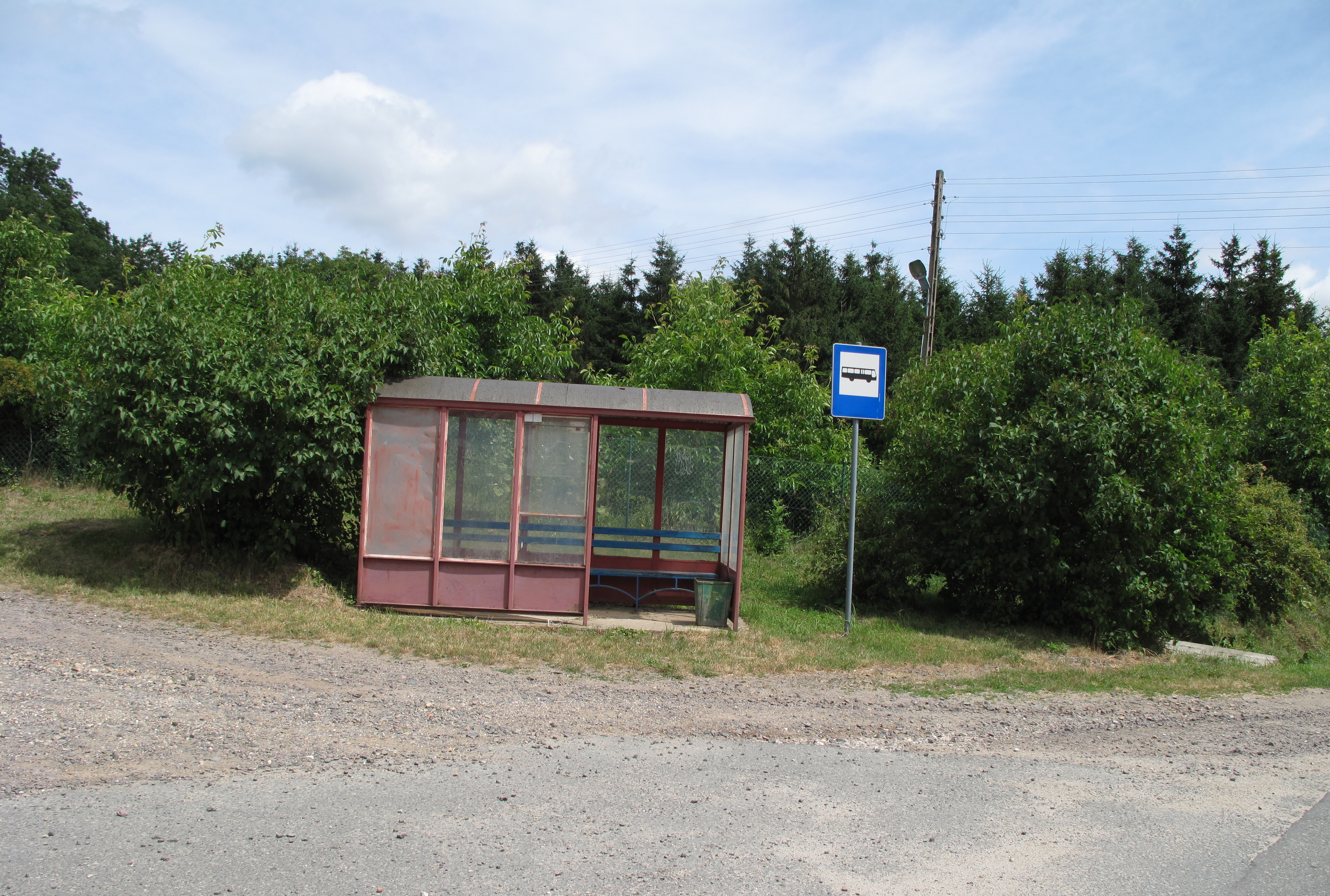
Bus stop
