= Stare Rochowice =

- Village
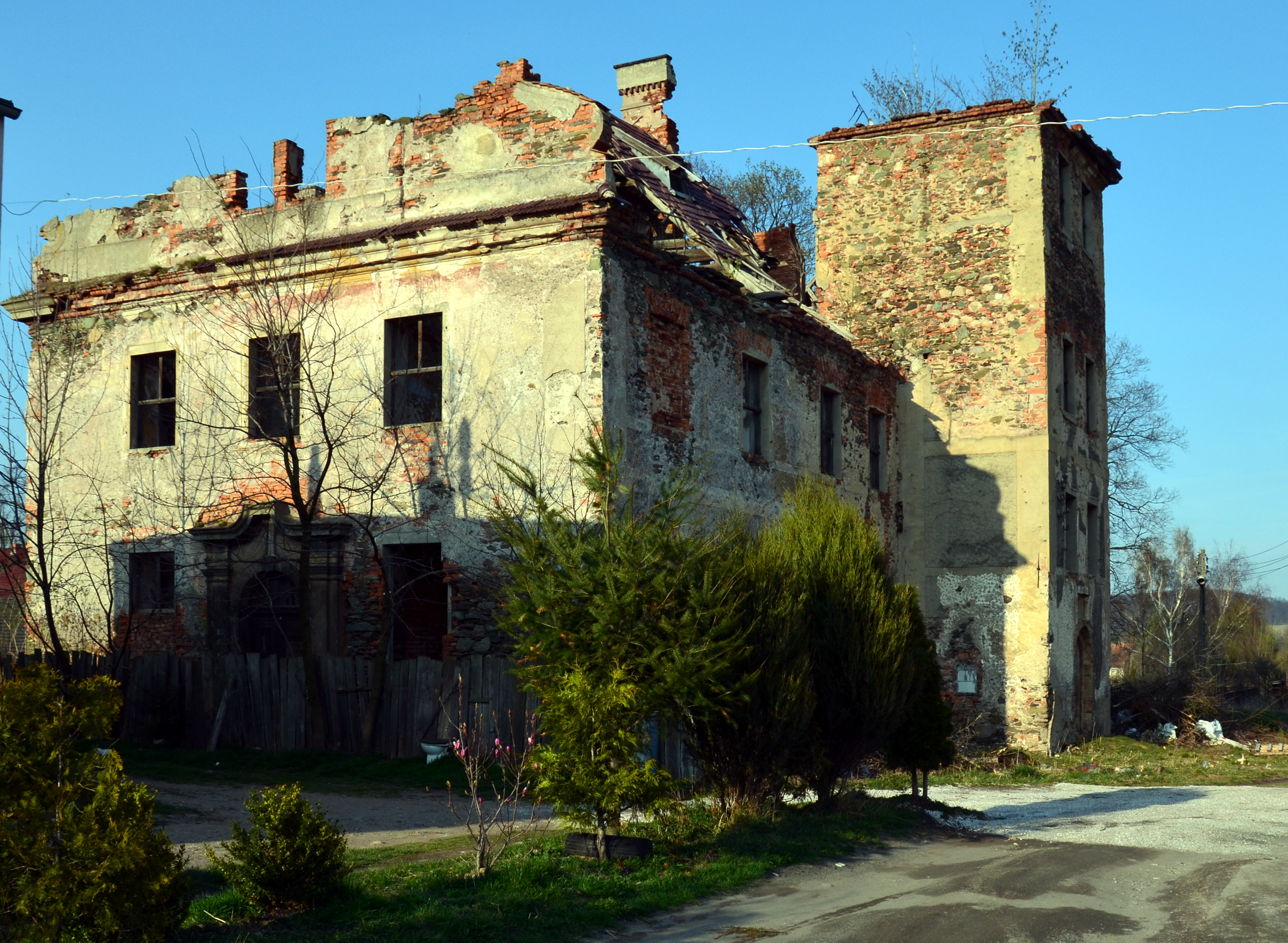

- Location within Poland
- Coordinates: 50°55′00″N 16°03′00″E
- Country: Poland
- Voivodeship: Lower Silesian
- County: Jawor
- Gmina: Bolków
- Highest elevation: 500 m (1,600 ft)
- Population: 435

Stare Rochowice [ˈstarɛ rɔxɔˈvit͡sɛ] is a village in the administrative district of Gmina Bolków, within Jawor County, Lower Silesian Voivodeship, in south-western Poland.
