= Grudno =

- Village
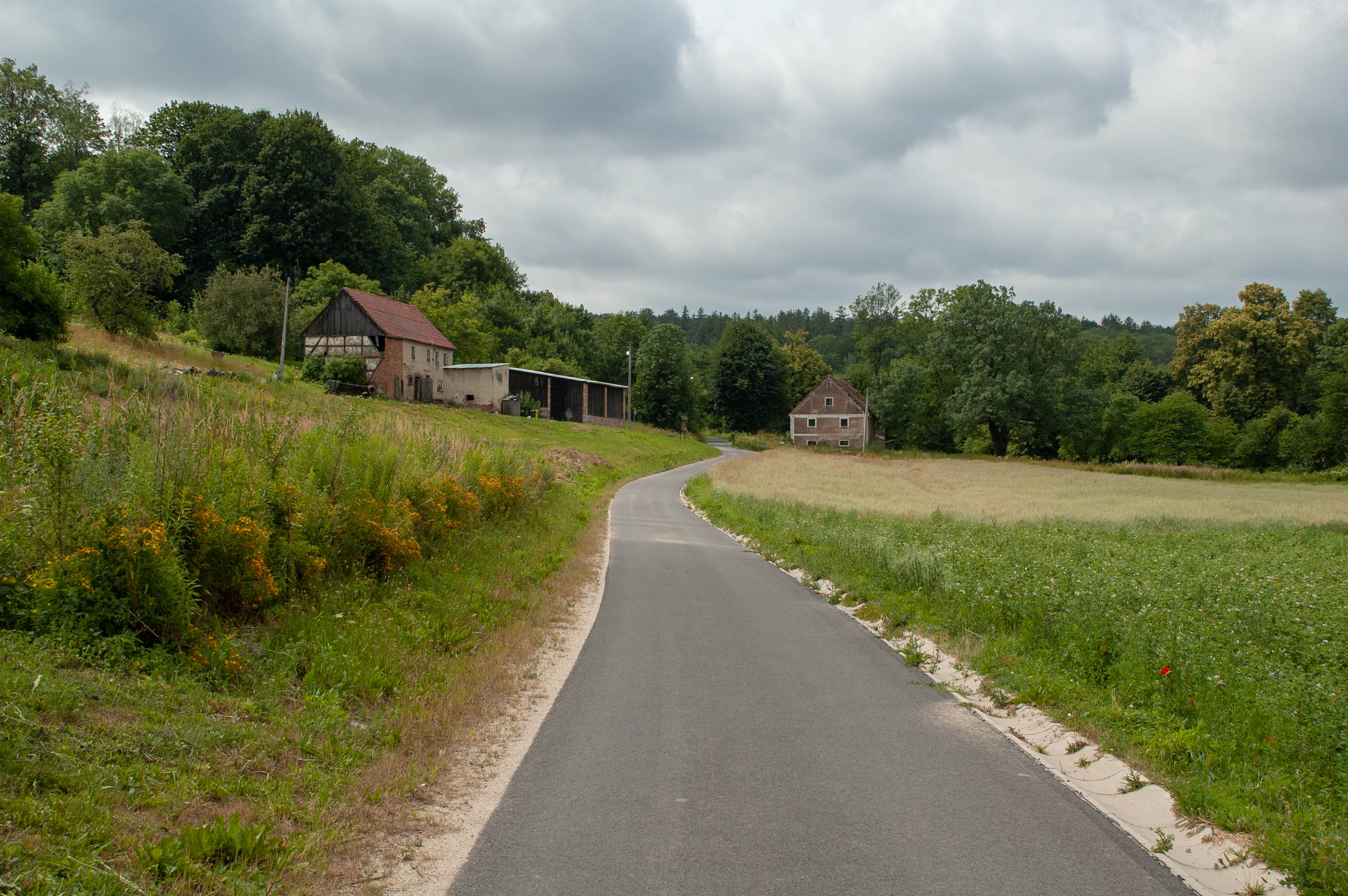

- Location within Poland
- Coordinates: 50°57′6″N 16°3′33″E
- Country: Poland
- Voivodeship: Lower Silesian
- Powiat: Jawor
- Gmina: Bolków
- Population: 76

Grudno [ˈɡrudnɔ] is a village in the administrative district of Gmina Bolków, within Jawor County, Lower Silesian Voivodeship, in south-western Poland.

== Gallery ==
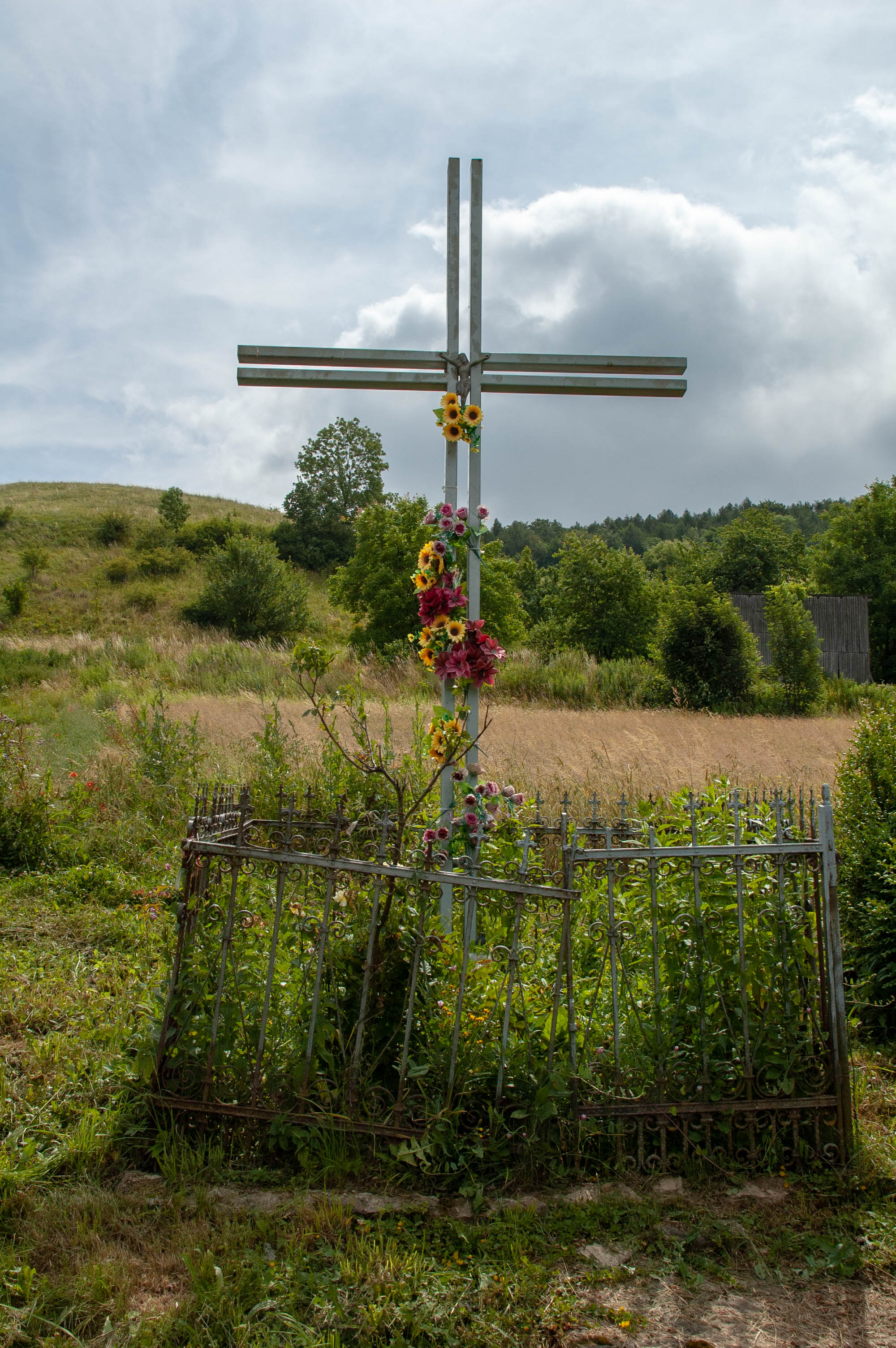
Wayside cross

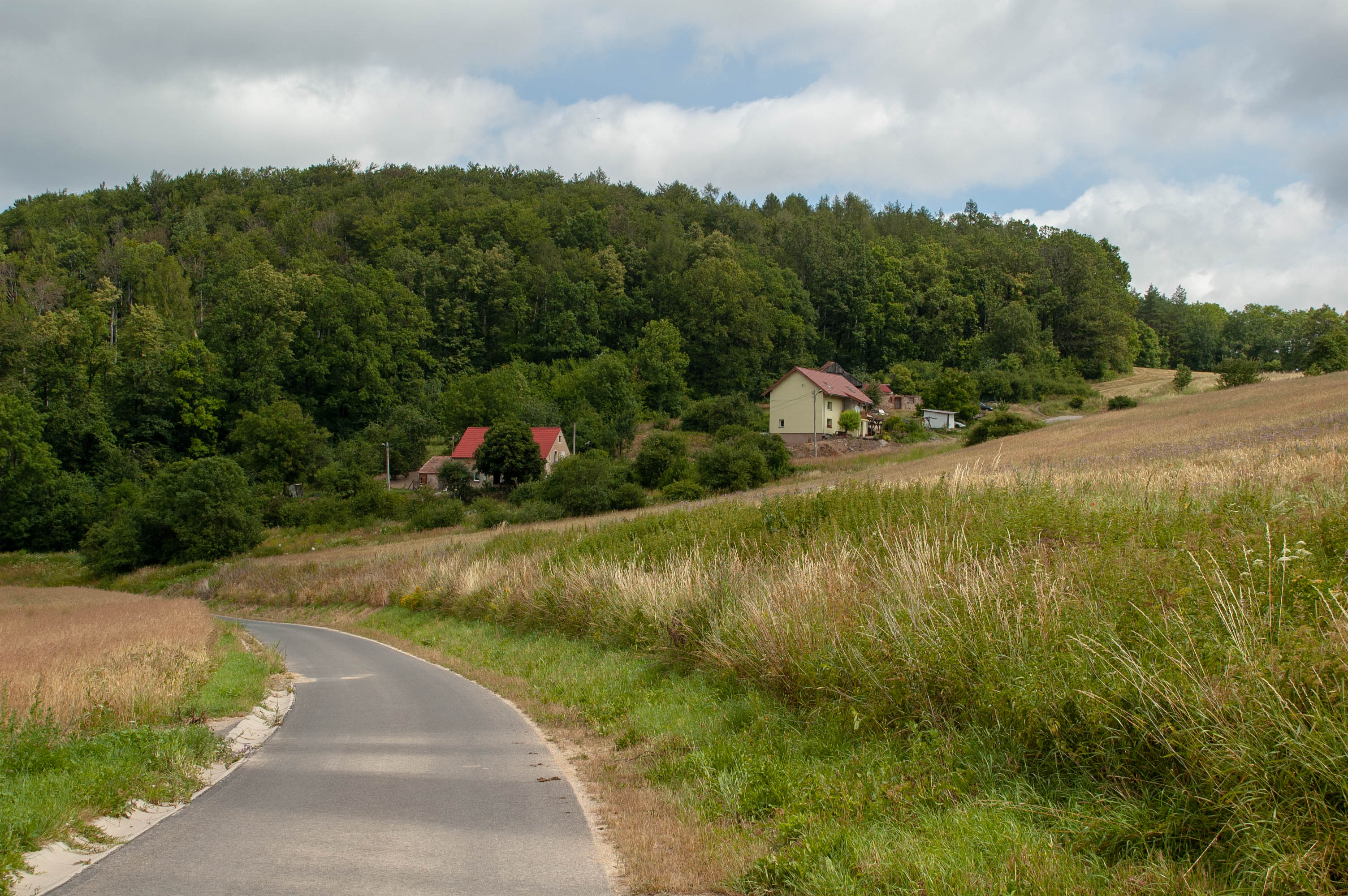
Houses

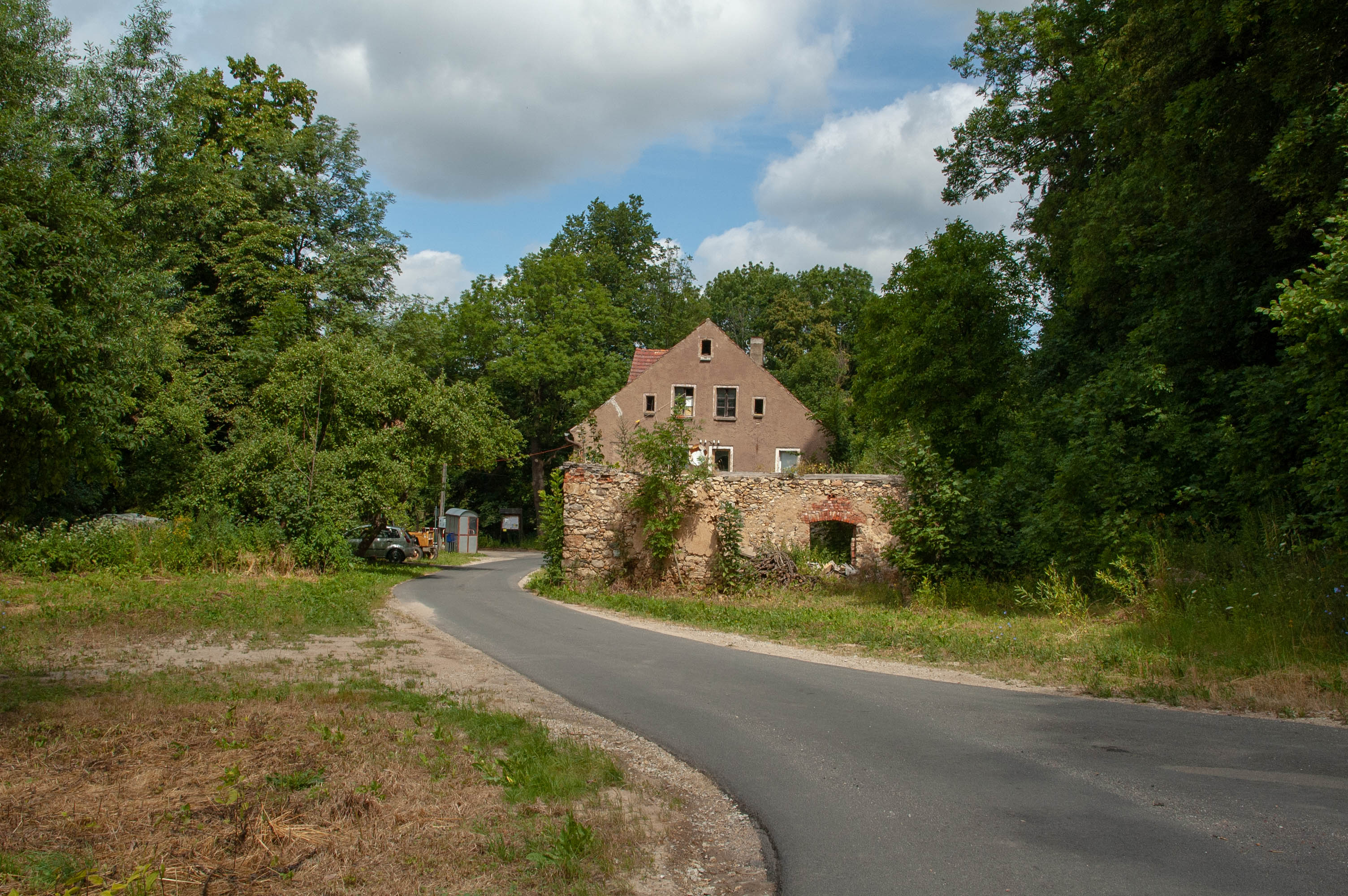
House

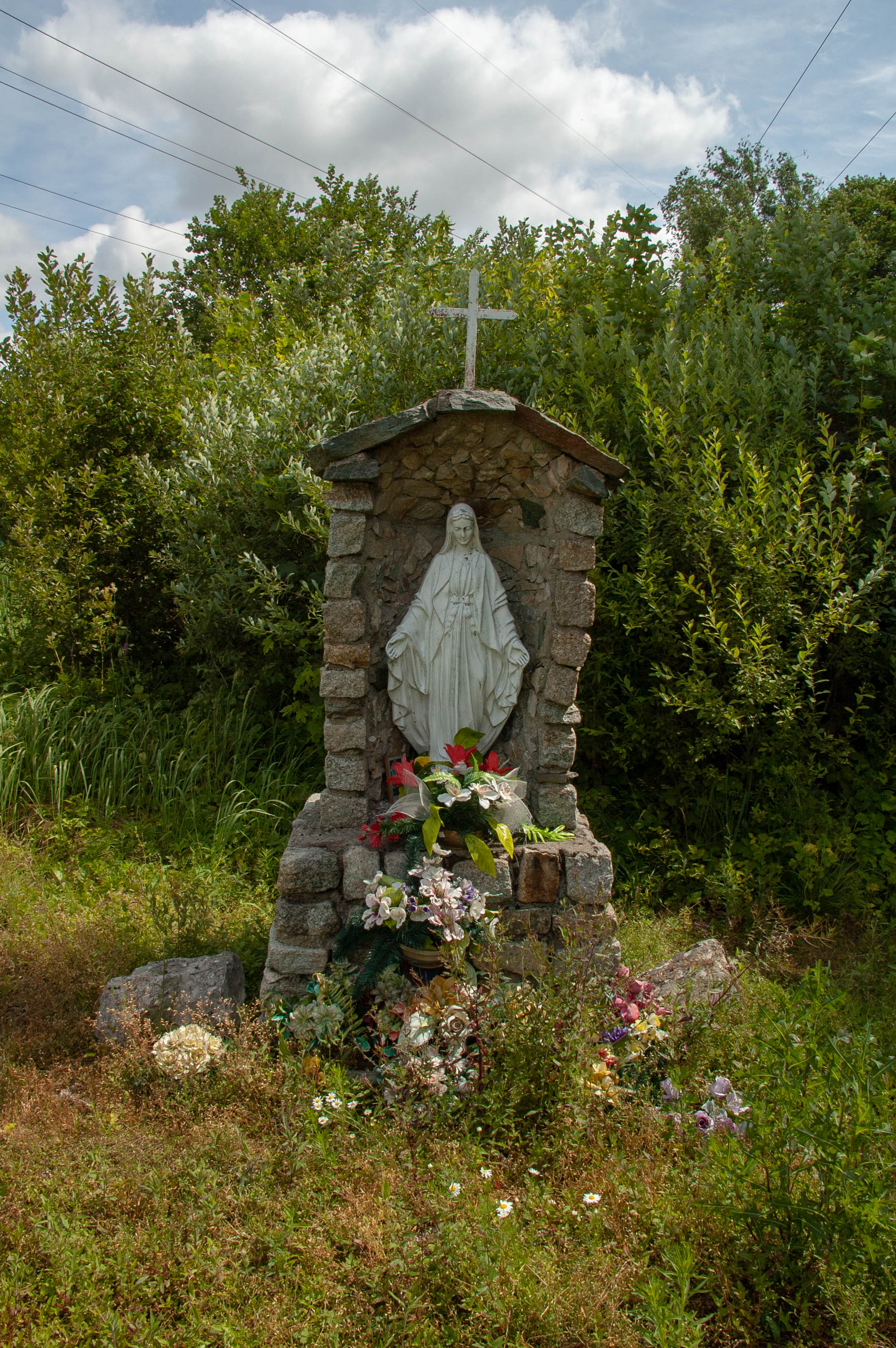
Wayside shrine with Our Lady
