= Nowa Wieś Wielka =

Nowa Wieś Wielka may refer to the following places in Poland:

- Nowa Wieś Wielka, Lower Silesian Voivodeship (south-west Poland)
- Nowa Wieś Wielka, Kuyavian-Pomeranian Voivodeship (north-central Poland)
- Nowa Wieś Wielka, Greater Poland Voivodeship (west-central Poland)
- Nowa Wieś Wielka, Lidzbark County in Warmian-Masurian Voivodeship (north Poland)
- Nowa Wieś Wielka, Nidzica County in Warmian-Masurian Voivodeship (north Poland)
