= Broniszewo =

Broniszewo may refer to the following places:

- Broniszewo, Koło County in Greater Poland Voivodeship (west-central Poland)
- Broniszewo, Konin County in Greater Poland Voivodeship (west-central Poland)
- Broniszewo, Podlaskie Voivodeship (north-east Poland)
- Broniszewo, Września County in Greater Poland Voivodeship (west-central Poland)
- Broniszewo, Warmian-Masurian Voivodeship (north Poland)
