= Zębowice =

Zębowice may refer to the following places in Poland:

- Zębowice, Lower Silesian Voivodeship (southwestern Poland)
- Zębowice, Opole Voivodeship (southern Poland)
