= Siedmica =

- Village
- Location within Poland
- Coordinates: 50°59′N 16°6′E
- Country: Poland
- Voivodeship: Lower Silesian
- Powiat: Jawor
- Gmina: Paszowice
- Time zone: UTC+1 (CET)
  - Summer (DST): UTC+2 (CEST)
- Vehicle registration: DJA

Siedmica [ɕɛdˈmit͡sa] is a village in the administrative district of Gmina Paszowice, within Jawor County, Lower Silesian Voivodeship, in south-western Poland.

During World War II, a German forced labour subcamp of the prison in Jawor was operated in the village.
