= Sokola, Lower Silesian Voivodeship =

Sokola
- Village
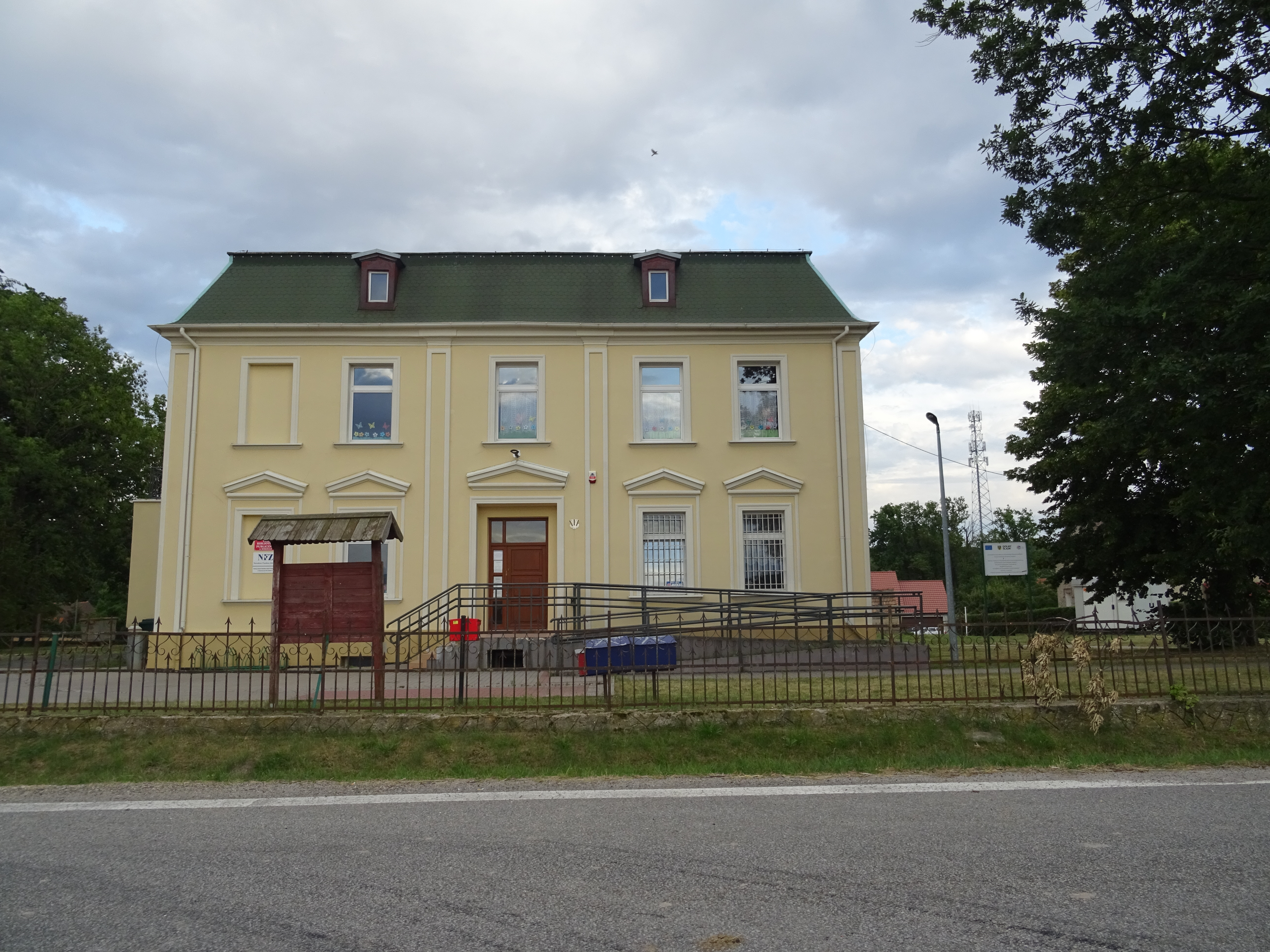
- House

- Location within Poland
- Coordinates: 50°59′N 16°10′E
- Country: Poland
- Voivodeship: Lower Silesian
- Powiat: Jawor
- Gmina: Paszowice
- Time zone: UTC+1 (CET)
  - Summer (DST): UTC+2 (CEST)
- Vehicle registration: DJA

Sokola [sɔˈkɔla] is a village in the administrative district of Gmina Paszowice, within Jawor County, Lower Silesian Voivodeship, in south-western Poland.

== Gallery ==
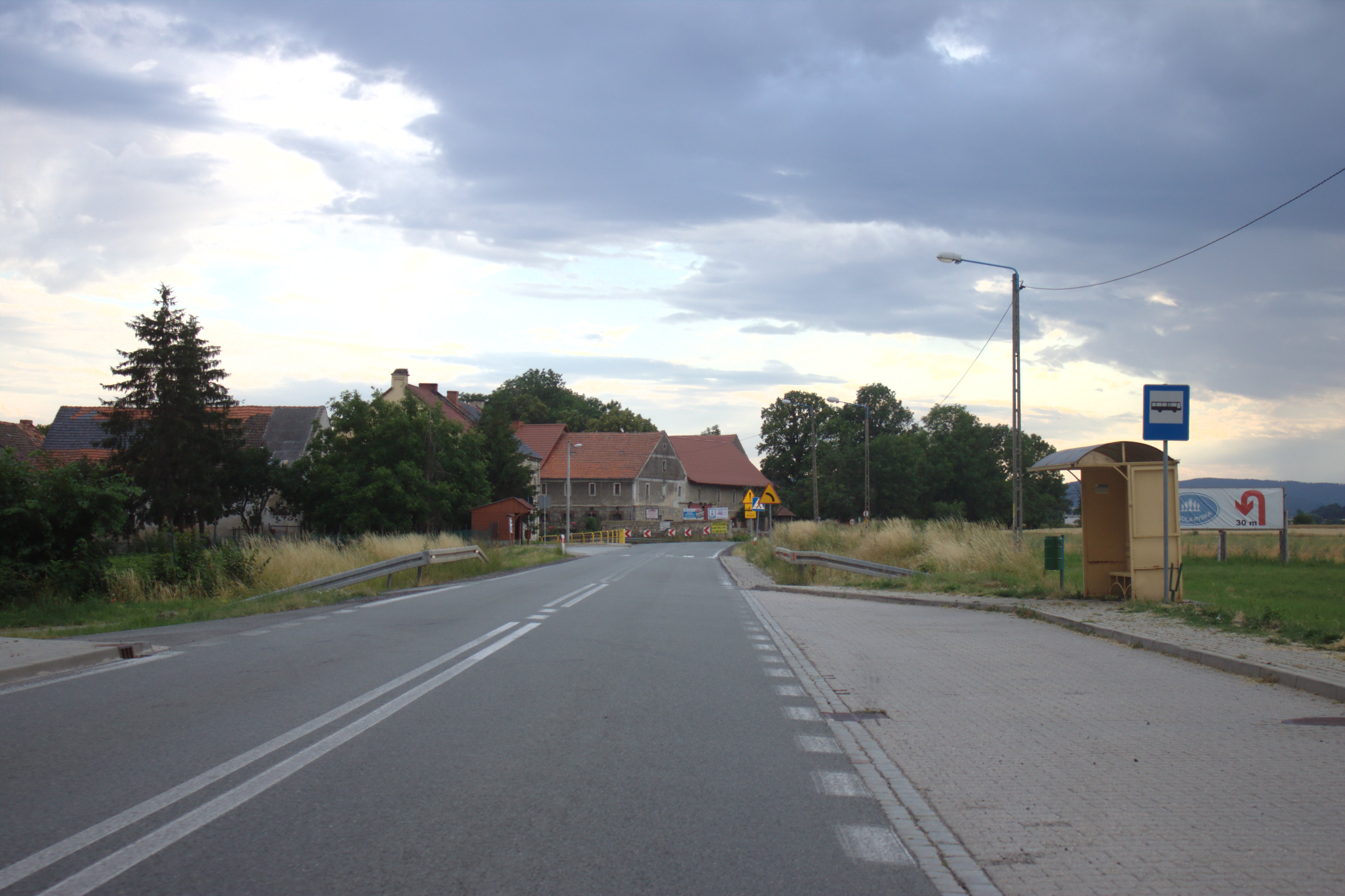
Road with a bus stop

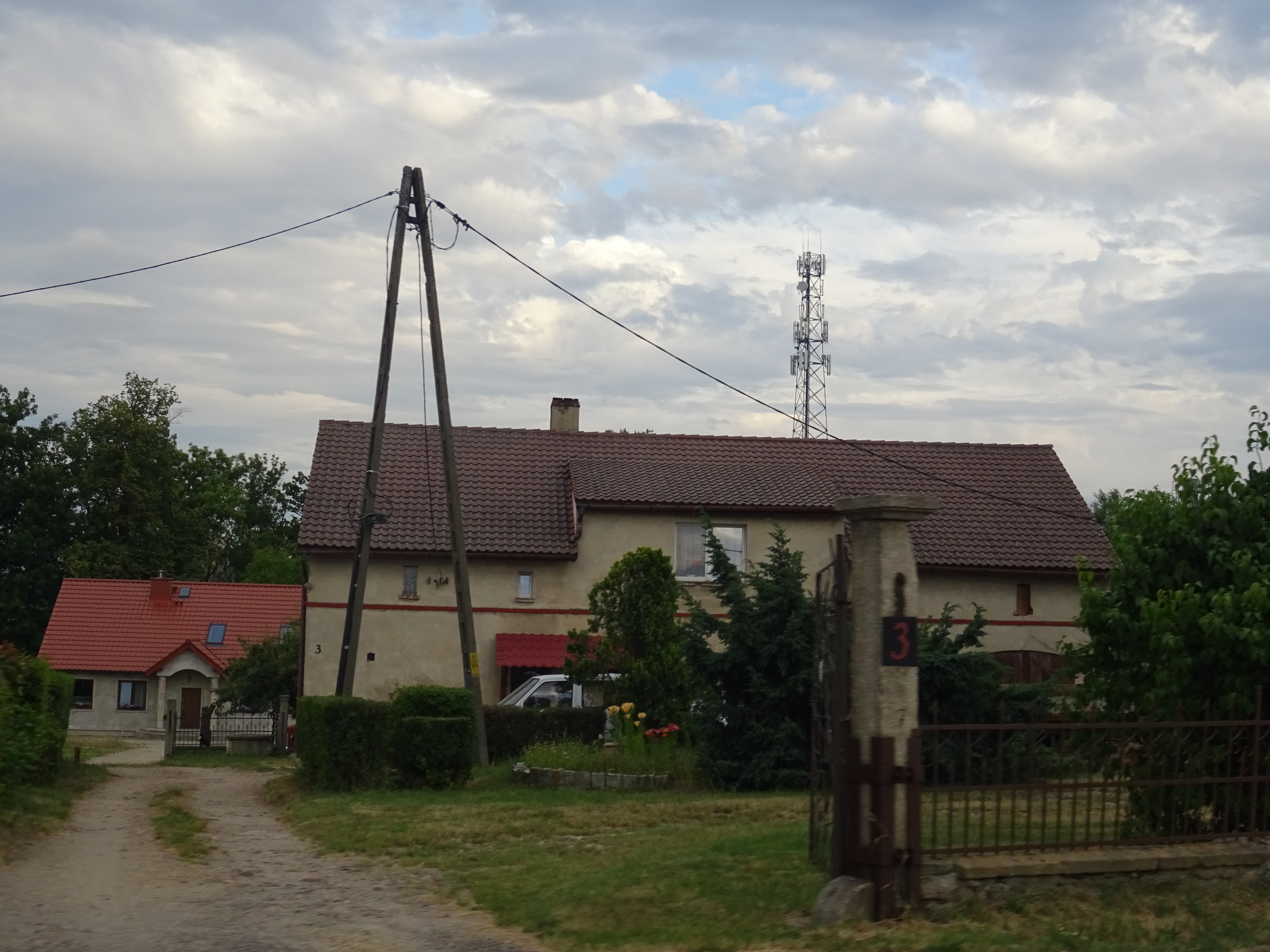
House with the garden

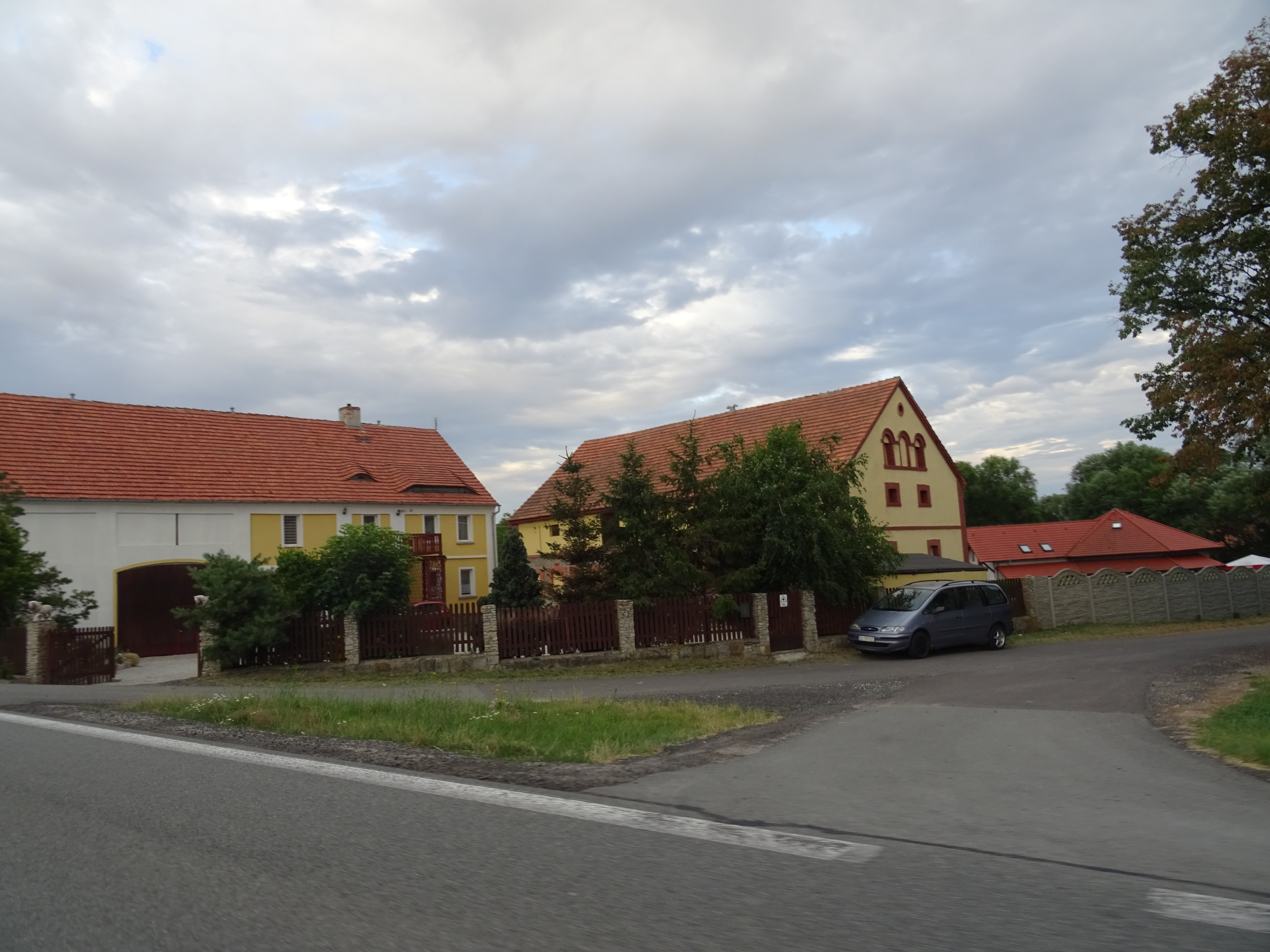
Houses
