= Gmina Paszowice =

Gmina Paszowice Paszowice Commune
- Gmina
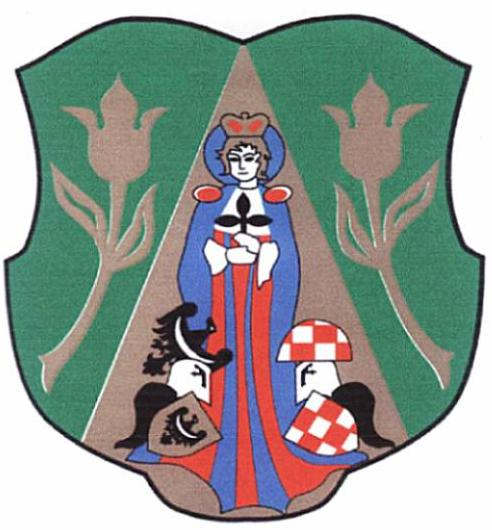
- Flag Coat of arms
- Interactive map of Gmina Paszowice
- Coordinates (Paszowice): 51°1′N 16°10′E
- Country: Poland
- Voivodeship: Lower Silesian
- County: Jawor
- Seat: Paszowice

Area
  - Total: 100.84 km^{2} (38.93 sq mi)

Population (2019-06-30)
  - Total: 3,976
  - Density: 39.43/km^{2} (102.1/sq mi)
- Website: http://www.paszowice.pl

Gmina Paszowice is a rural area - gmina (administrative district) in Jawor County, Lower Silesian Voivodeship, in south-western Poland. Its seat is the village of Paszowice, which lies approximately 4 kilometres (2 mi) south of Jawor and 63 km (39 mi) west of the regional capital Wrocław.

The gmina covers an area of 100.84 square kilometres (38.93 sq mi), and as of 2019 its total population is 3,976.

== Neighbouring gminas ==
Gmina Paszowice is bordered by the town of Jawor and the gminas of Bolków, Dobromierz, Męcinka and Mściwojów.

== Villages ==
The gmina contains the villages of Bolkowice, Grobla, Jakuszowa, Kamienica, Kłonice, Kwietniki, Myślibórz, Nowa Wieś Mała, Nowa Wieś Wielka, Paszowice, Pogwizdów, Siedmica, Sokola, Wiadrów and Zębowice.

== Twin towns – sister cities ==
Gmina Paszowice is twinned with:

- Pakosław, Poland
- Plavy, Czech Republic
- Rapotín, Czech Republic
