= Lipiny, Gmina Przedecz =

Lipiny
- Settlement
- Location within Poland
- Coordinates: 52°19′19″N 19°02′40″E
- Country: Poland
- Voivodeship: Greater Poland
- County: Koło
- Gmina: Przedecz
- Time zone: UTC+1 (CET)
  - Summer (DST): UTC+2 (CEST)
- Vehicle registration: PKL

Lipiny [liˈpinɨ] is a settlement in the administrative district of Gmina Przedecz, within Koło County, Greater Poland Voivodeship, in central Poland.
