= Kwietniki =

- Village
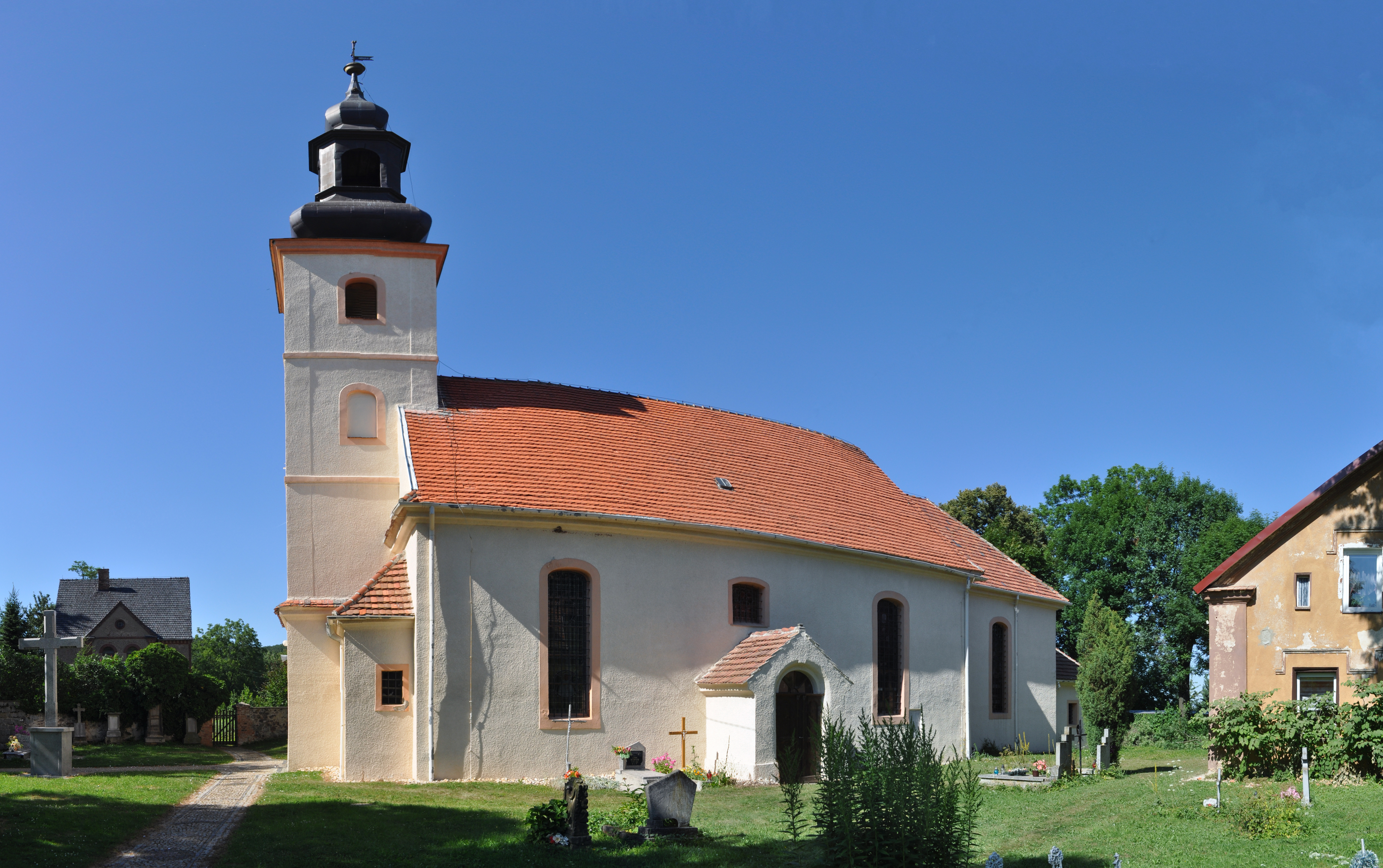
- Church in Kwietniki

- Location within Poland
- Coordinates: 50°58′N 16°9′E
- Country: Poland
- Voivodeship: Lower Silesian
- Powiat: Jawor
- Gmina: Paszowice
- Time zone: UTC+1 (CET)
  - Summer (DST): UTC+2 (CEST)
- Vehicle registration: DJA

Kwietniki [kfjɛtˈniki] is a village in the administrative district of Gmina Paszowice, within Jawor County, Lower Silesian Voivodeship, in south-western Poland.

== Gallery ==
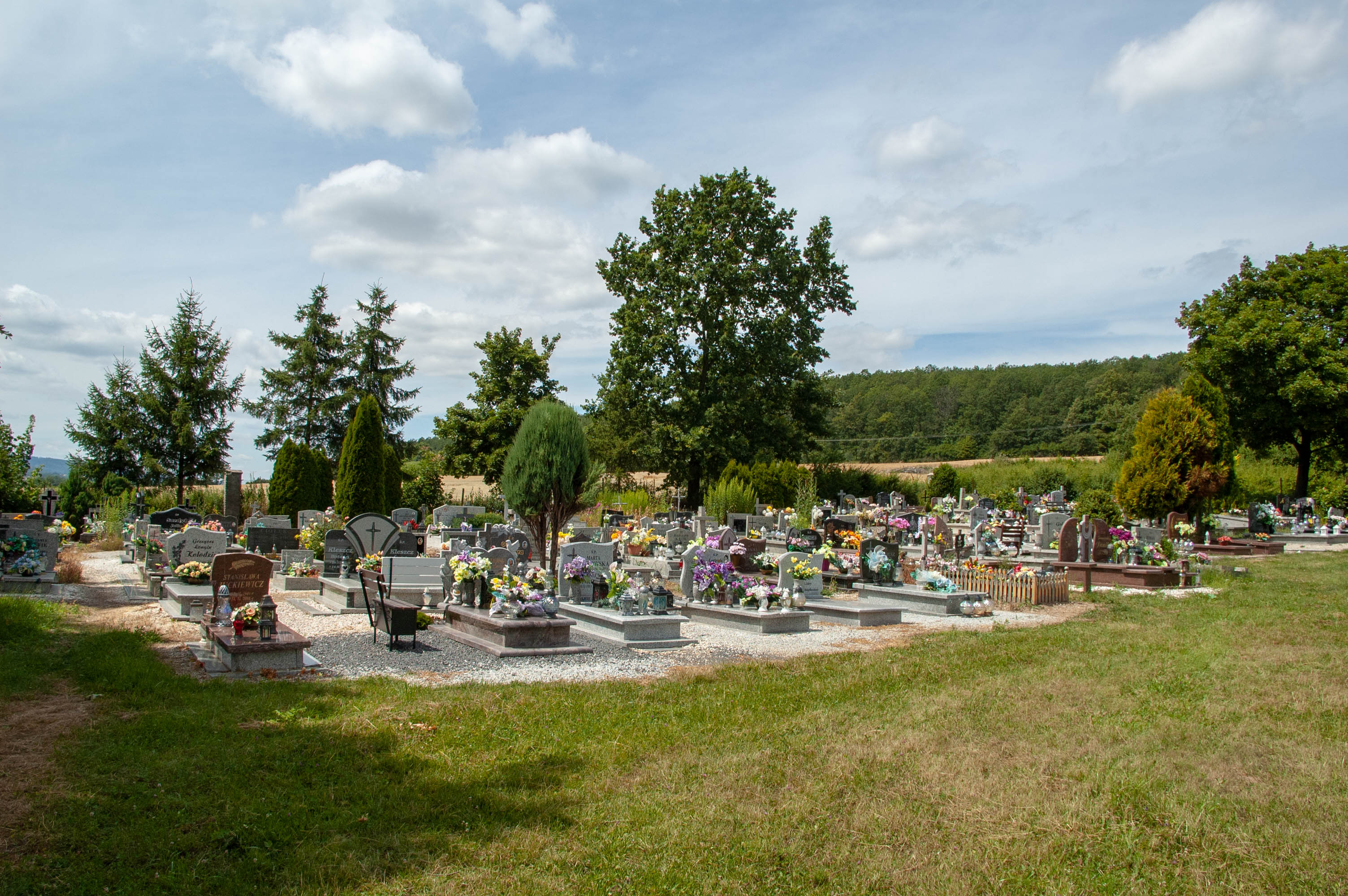
Local cemetery

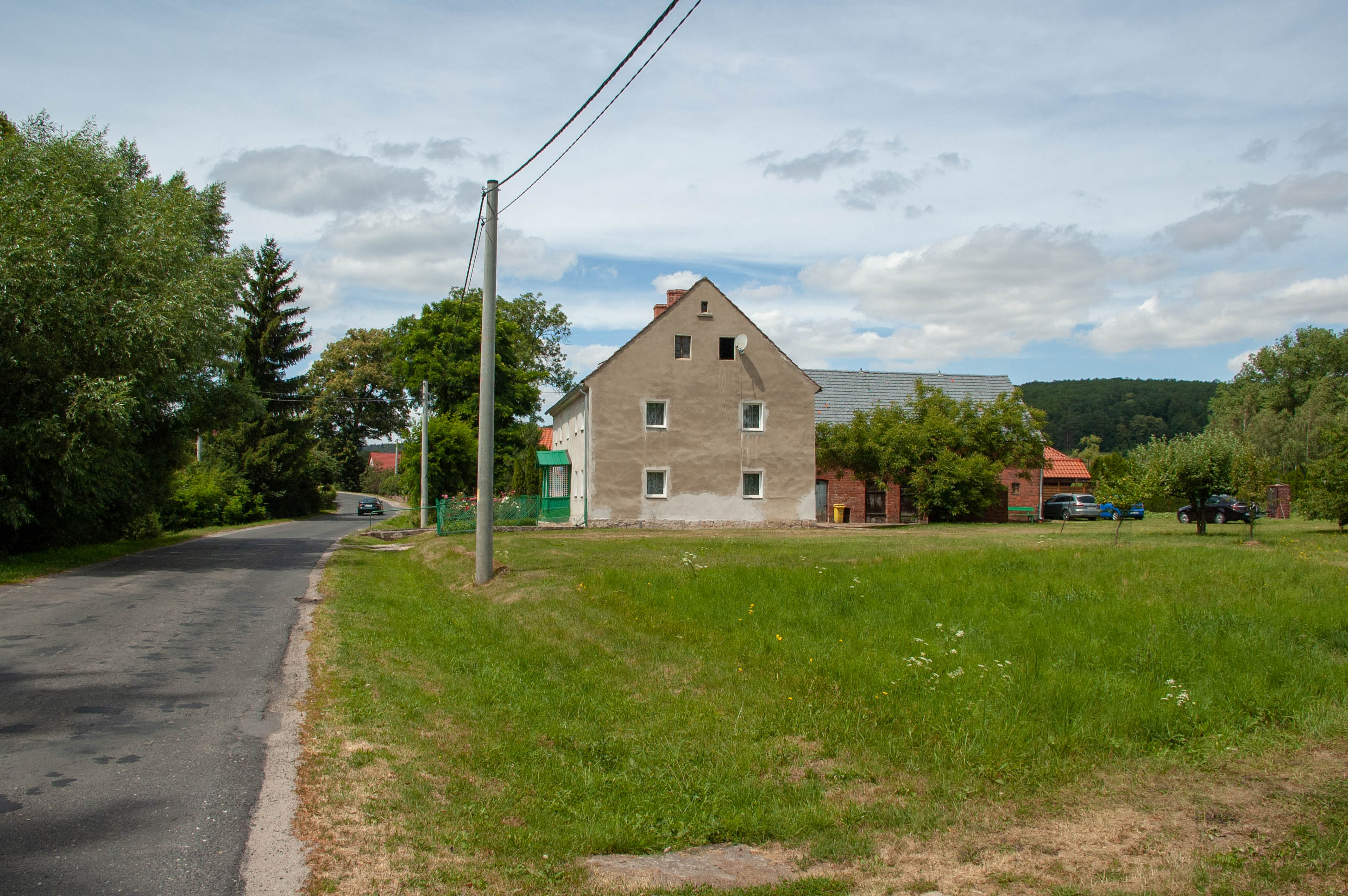
House by road

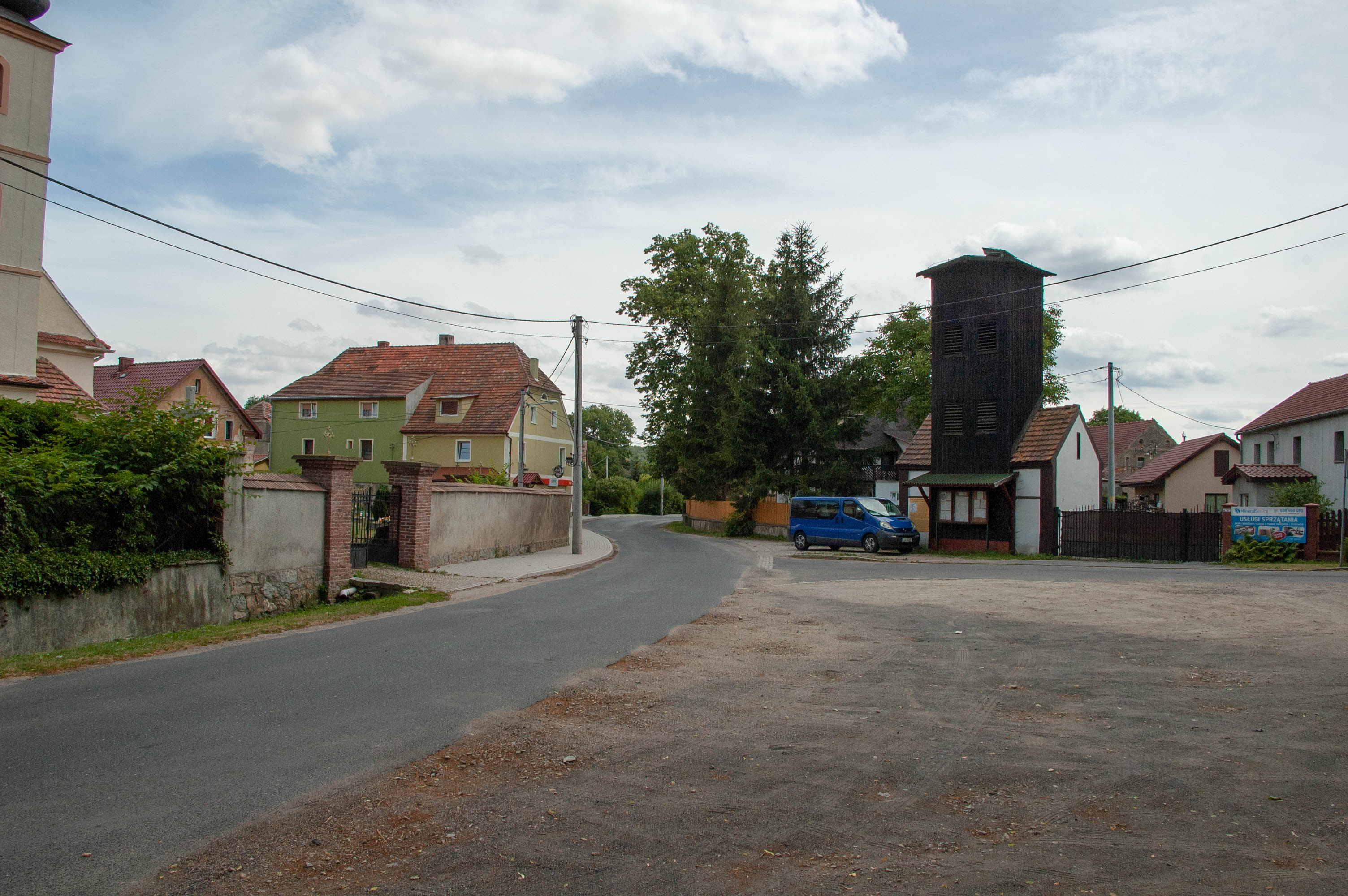
Village square

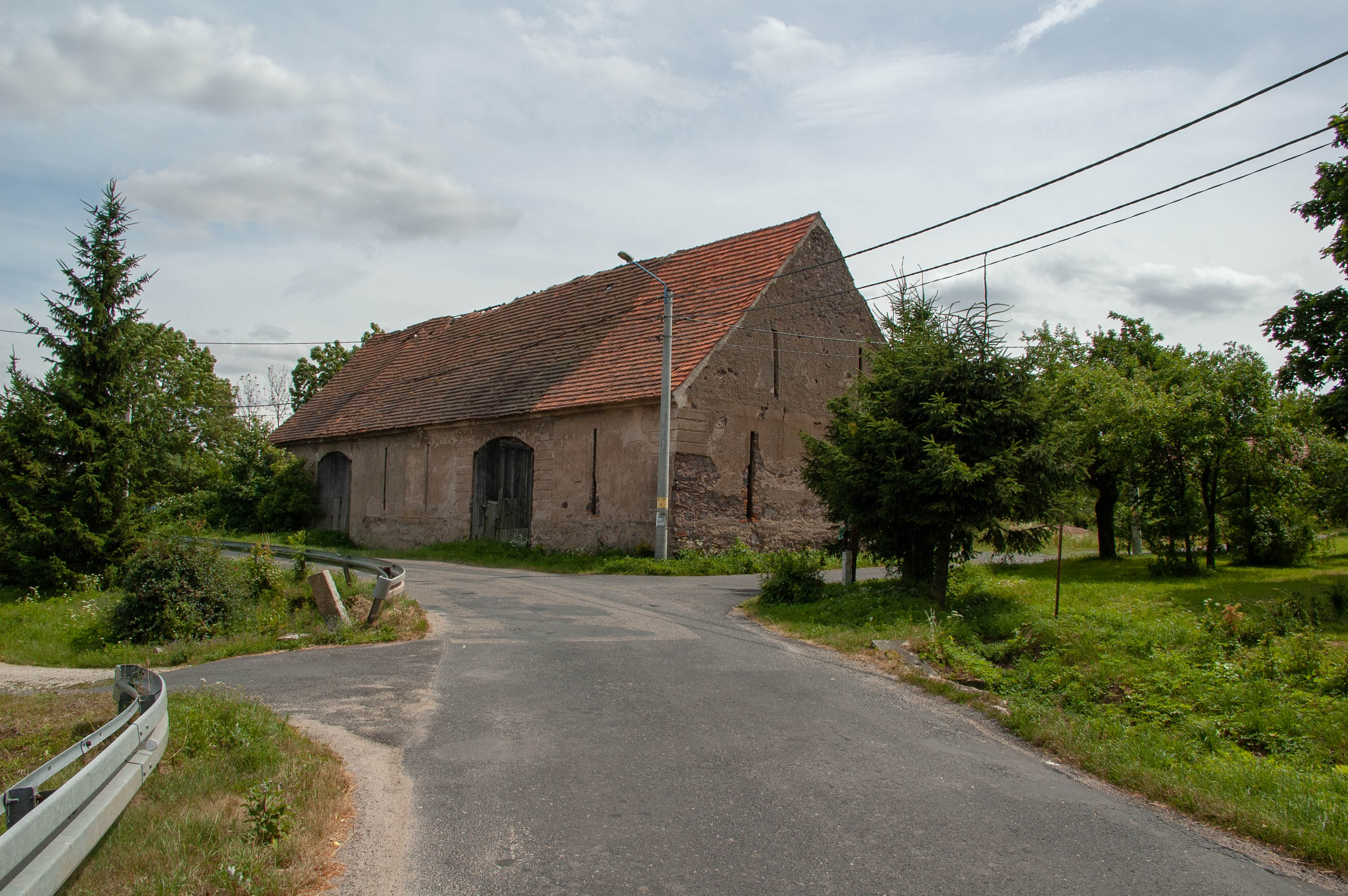
Barn
