= Zalesie, Koło County =

Zalesie
- Village
- Location within Poland
- Coordinates: 52°20′22″N 18°50′41″E
- Country: Poland
- Voivodeship: Greater Poland
- County: Koło
- Gmina: Przedecz
- Population: 157
- Time zone: UTC+1 (CET)
  - Summer (DST): UTC+2 (CEST)
- Vehicle registration: PKL

Zalesie [zaˈlɛɕɛ] is a village in the administrative district of Gmina Przedecz, within Koło County, Greater Poland Voivodeship, in central Poland.
