= Grobla, Lower Silesian Voivodeship =

Grobla
- Village
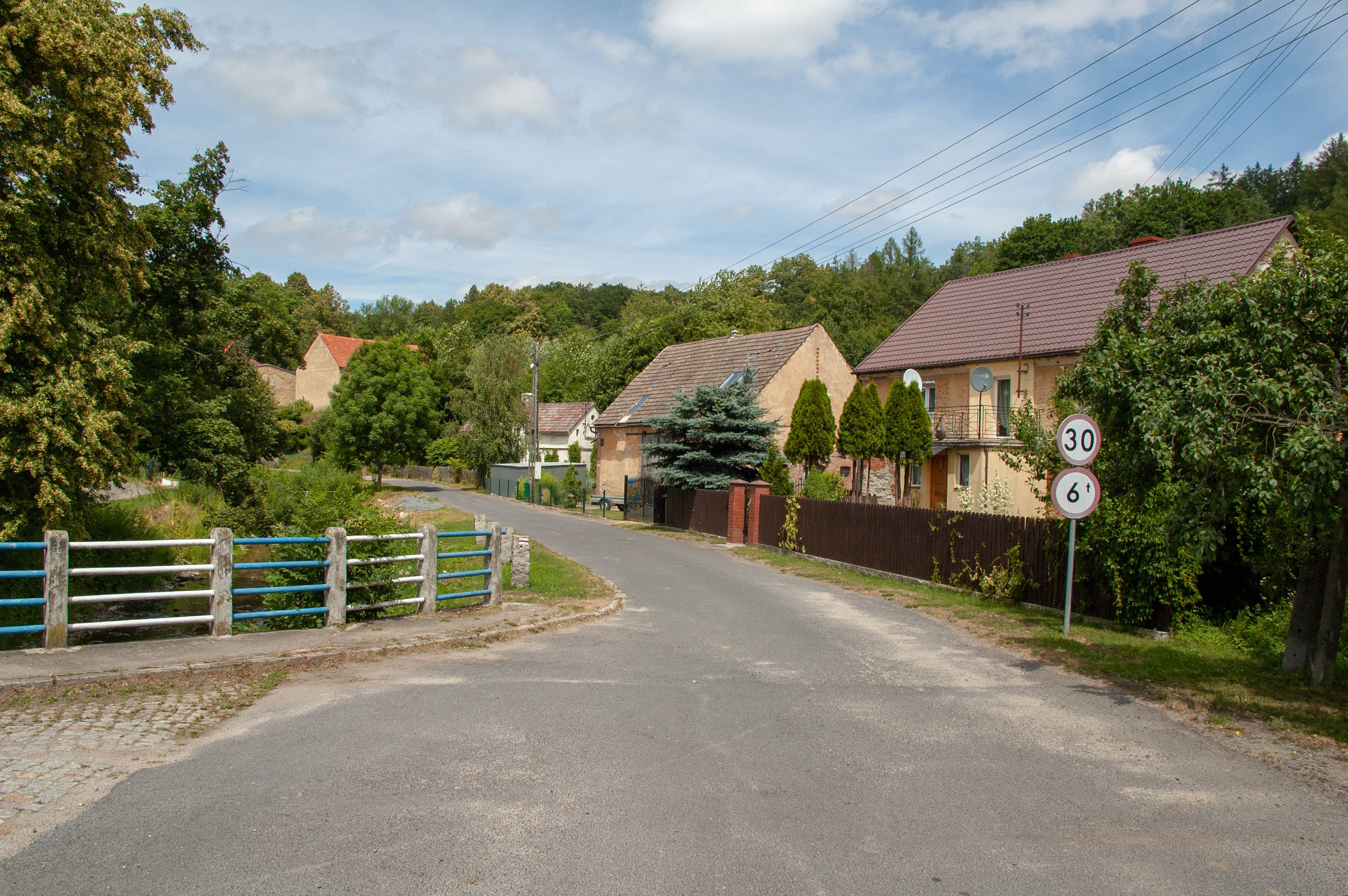
- Houses by the road

- Location within Poland
- Coordinates: 50°59′01″N 16°07′01″E
- Country: Poland
- Voivodeship: Lower Silesian
- County: Jawor
- Gmina: Paszowice
- Time zone: UTC+1 (CET)
  - Summer (DST): UTC+2 (CEST)
- Vehicle registration: DJA

Grobla [ˈɡrɔbla] is a village in the administrative district of Gmina Paszowice, within Jawor County, Lower Silesian Voivodeship, in south-western Poland.
