= Zbijewo-Kolonia =

- Village
- Location within Poland
- Coordinates: 52°21′55″N 18°58′22″E
- Country: Poland
- Voivodeship: Greater Poland
- County: Koło
- Gmina: Przedecz
- Time zone: UTC+1 (CET)
  - Summer (DST): UTC+2 (CEST)
- Vehicle registration: PKL

Zbijewo-Kolonia [zbiˈjɛvɔ kɔˈlɔɲa] is a village in the administrative district of Gmina Przedecz, within Koło County, Greater Poland Voivodeship, in central Poland.
