= Kamienica, Jawor County =

Kamienica
- Settlement
- Location within Poland
- Coordinates: 50°58′58″N 16°05′55″E
- Country: Poland
- Voivodeship: Lower Silesian
- County: Jawor
- Gmina: Paszowice

Kamienica is a settlement in Gmina Paszowice, Jawor County, Lower Silesian Voivodeship, in south-western Poland.

From 1975 to 1998 the village was in Legnica Voivodeship.
