= Żarowo, Greater Poland Voivodeship =

Żarowo
- Village
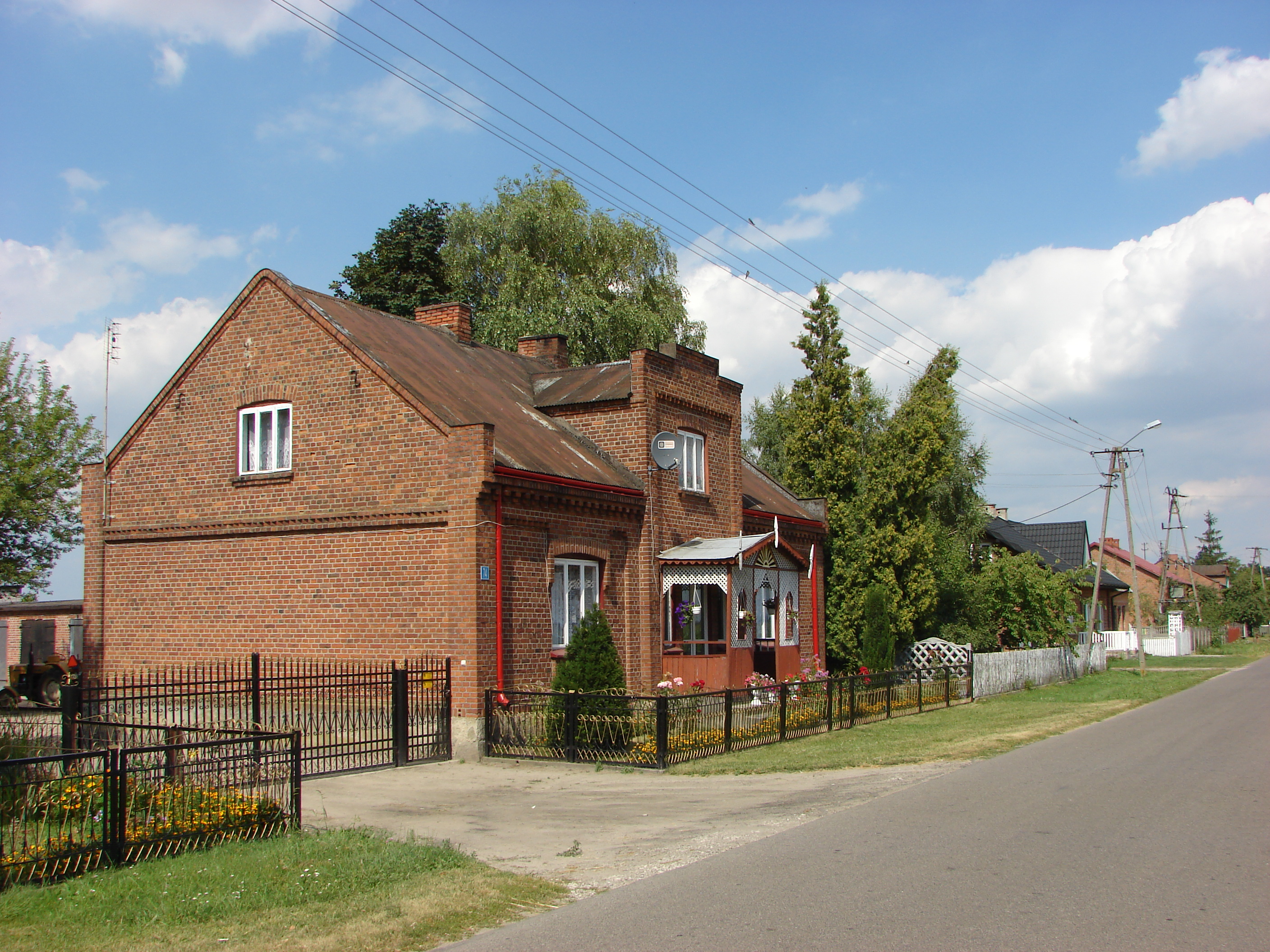

- Location within Poland
- Coordinates: 52°21′05″N 18°52′40″E
- Country: Poland
- Voivodeship: Greater Poland
- County: Koło
- Gmina: Przedecz
- Population: 367
- Time zone: UTC+1 (CET)
  - Summer (DST): UTC+2 (CEST)
- Vehicle registration: PKL

Żarowo [ʐaˈrɔvɔ] is a village in the administrative district of Gmina Przedecz, within Koło County, Greater Poland Voivodeship, in central Poland.
