= Łączewna, Greater Poland Voivodeship =

Łączewna
- Village
- Location within Poland
- Coordinates: 52°20′17″N 18°58′25″E
- Country: Poland
- Voivodeship: Greater Poland
- County: Koło
- Gmina: Przedecz
- Time zone: UTC+1 (CET)
  - Summer (DST): UTC+2 (CEST)
- Vehicle registration: PKL

Łączewna [wɔnˈt͡ʂɛvna] is a village in the administrative district of Gmina Przedecz, within Koło County, Greater Poland Voivodeship, in central Poland.
