= Paszowice =

- Village
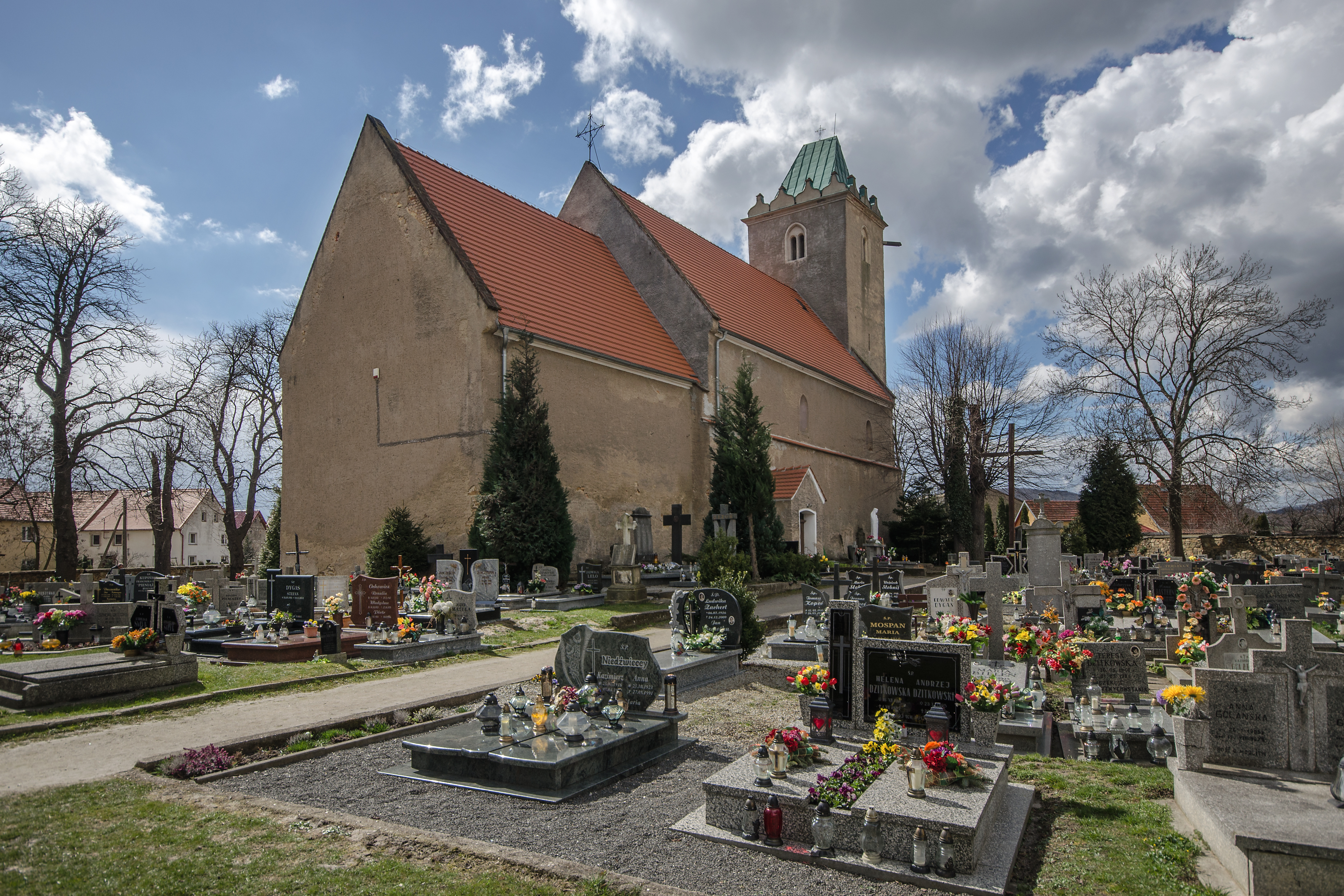
- Church of the Holy Trinity

- Location within Poland
- Coordinates: 51°1′N 16°10′E
- Country: Poland
- Voivodeship: Lower Silesian
- County: Jawor
- Gmina: Paszowice
- Time zone: UTC+1 (CET)
  - Summer (DST): UTC+2 (CEST)
- Vehicle registration: DJA

Paszowice [paʂɔˈvit͡sɛ] is a village in Jawor County, Lower Silesian Voivodeship, in south-western Poland. It is the seat of the administrative district (gmina) called Gmina Paszowice.

== Gallery ==
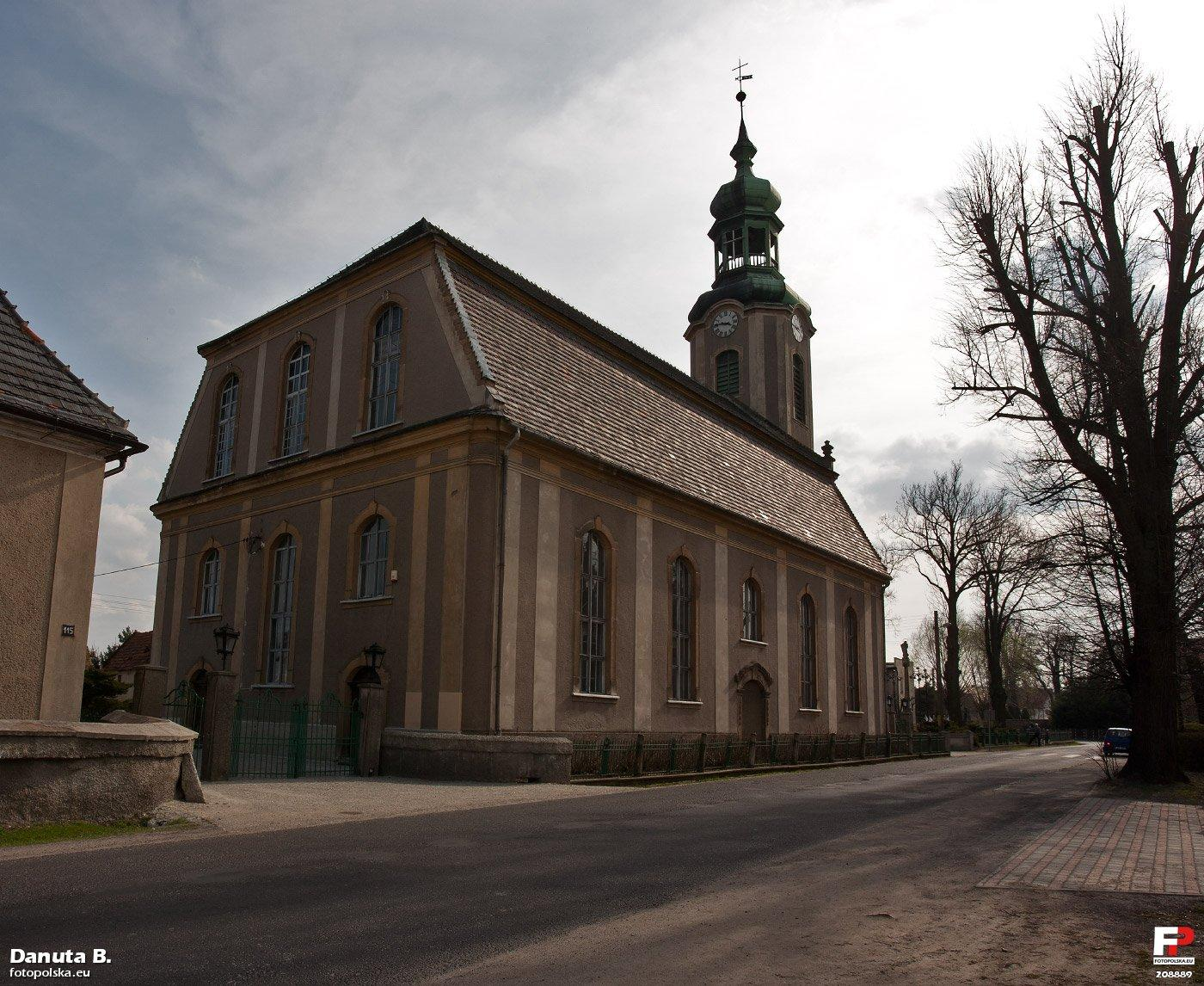
New church

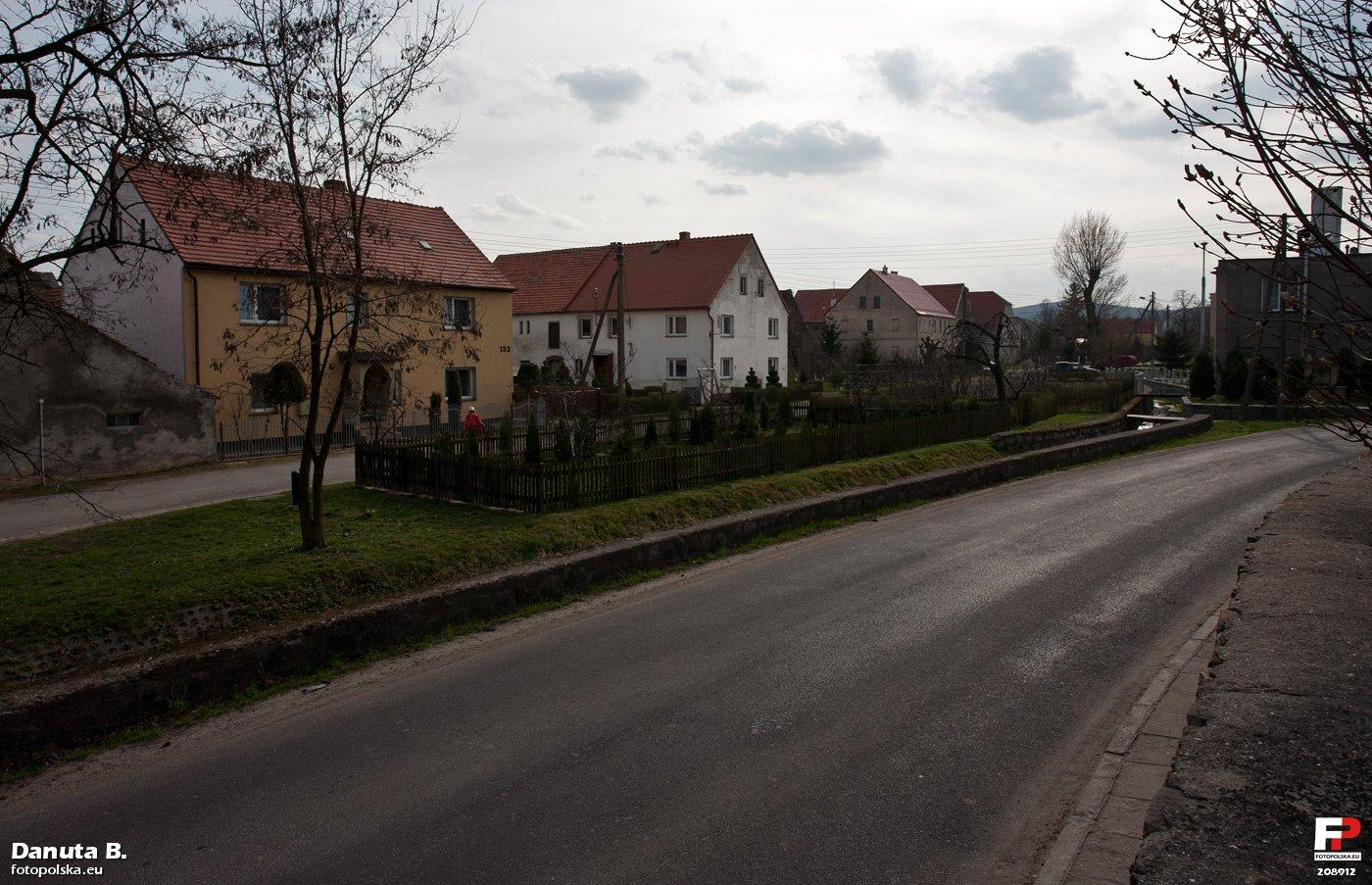
Street

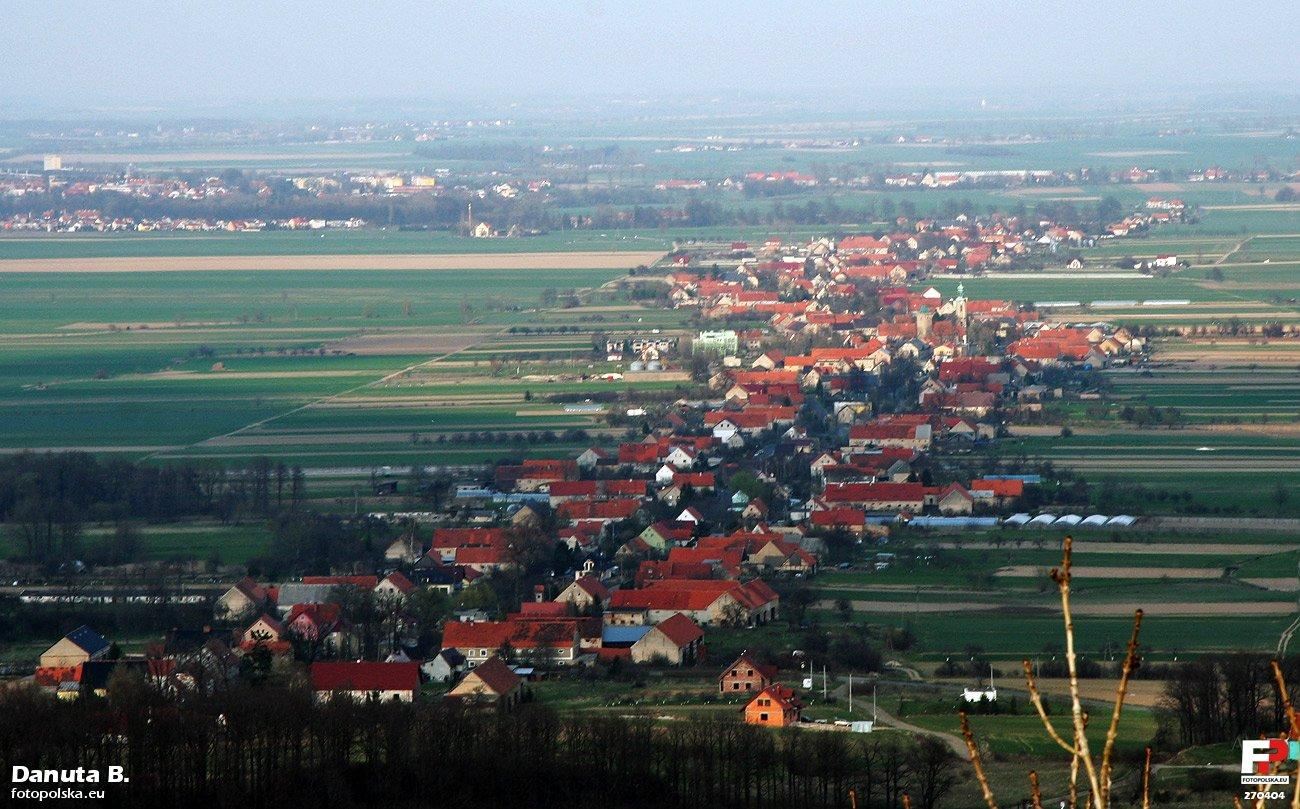
Village from the hill
