= Nowa Wieś Mała, Lower Silesian Voivodeship =

Nowa Wieś Mała
- Village
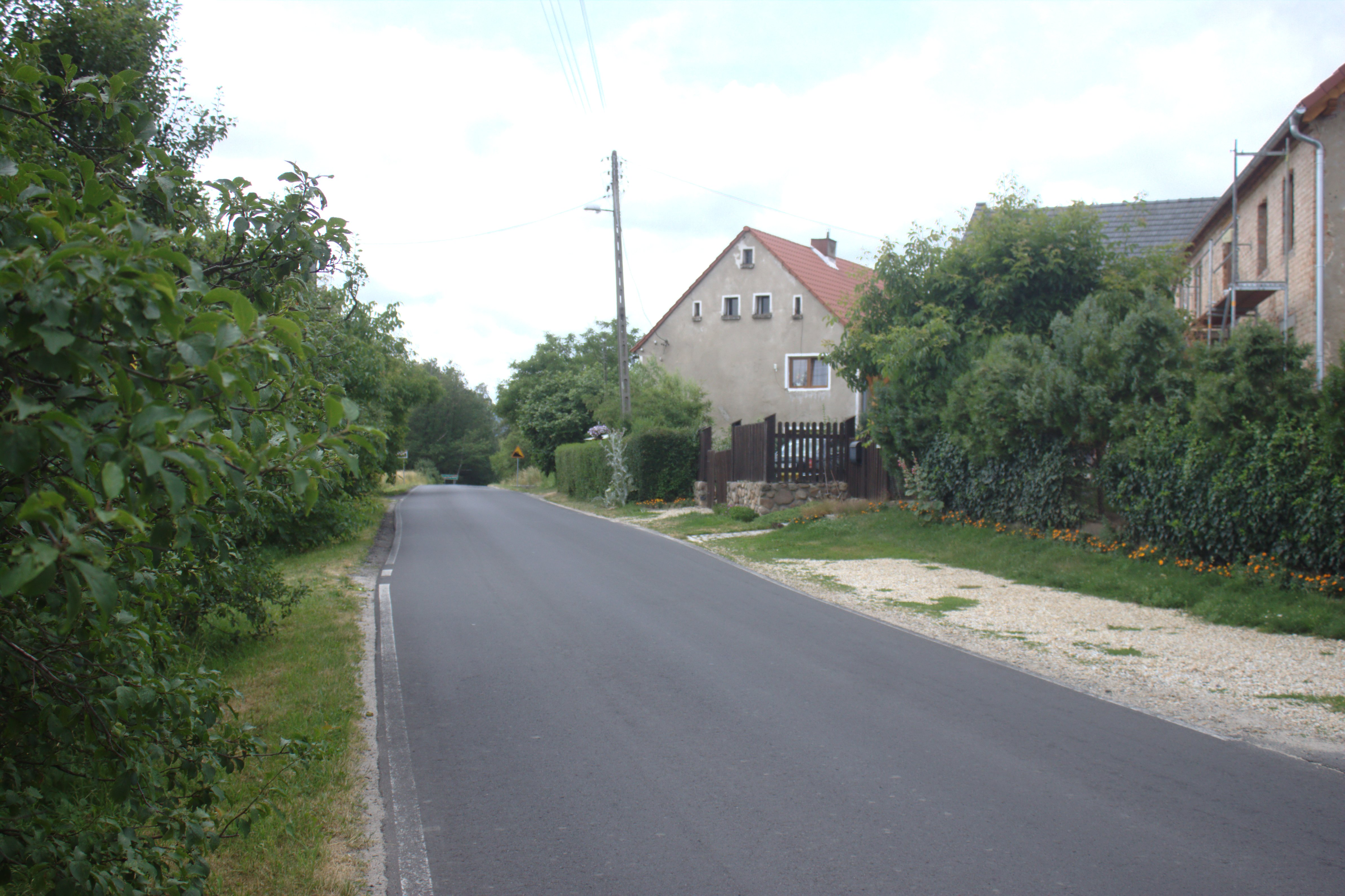
- House by the road

- Location within Poland
- Coordinates: 50°59′04″N 16°03′27″E
- Country: Poland
- Voivodeship: Lower Silesian
- Powiat: Jawor
- Gmina: Paszowice
- Population: 30
- Time zone: UTC+1 (CET)
  - Summer (DST): UTC+2 (CEST)
- Vehicle registration: DJA

Nowa Wieś Mała [ˈnɔva ˈvjɛɕ ˈmawa] is a village in the administrative district of Gmina Paszowice, within Jawor County, Lower Silesian Voivodeship, in south-western Poland.

== Gallery ==
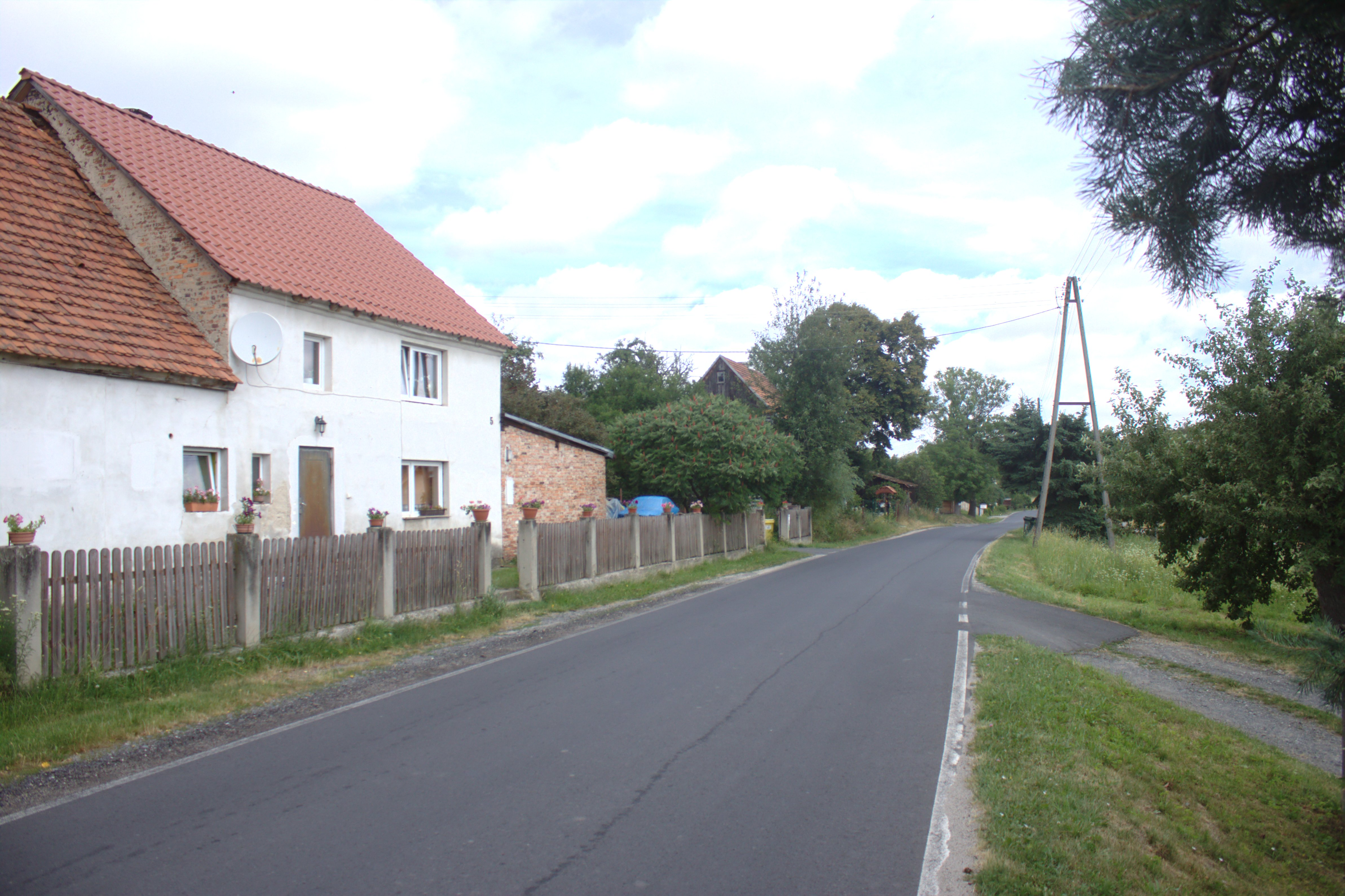
Road with houses

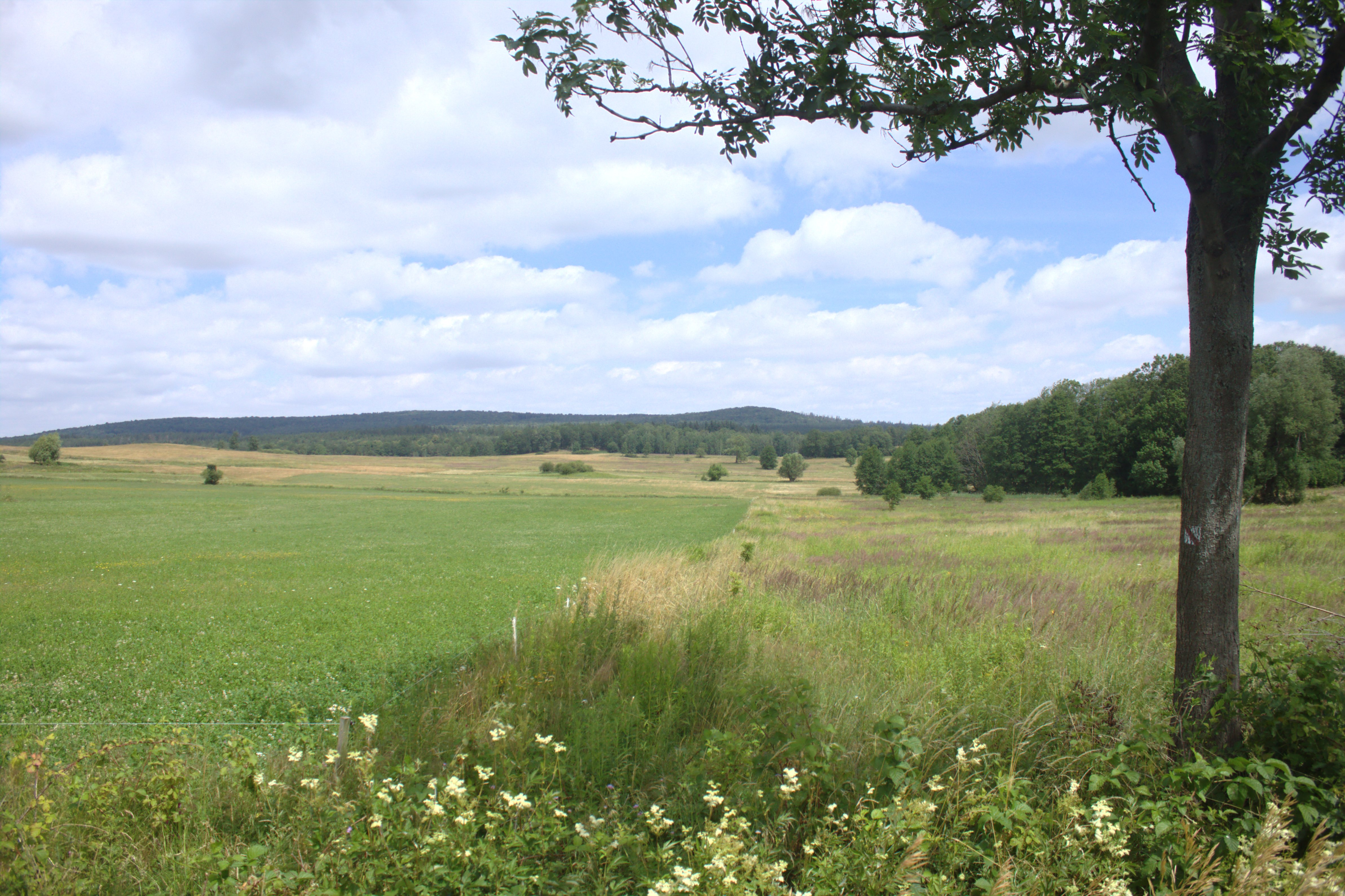
Surrounding countryside

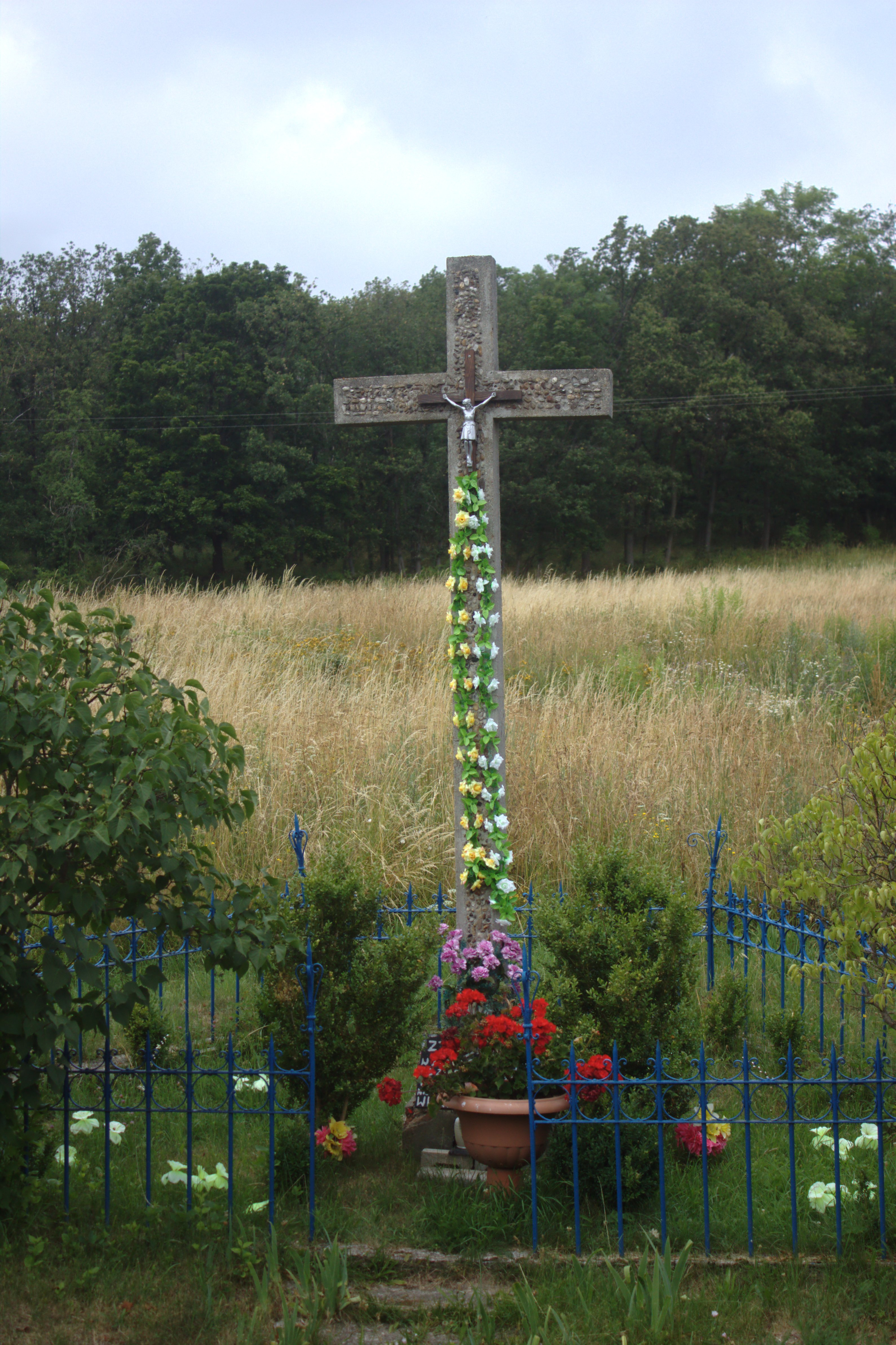
Wayside cross
