= Rogóźno, Greater Poland Voivodeship =

Rogóźno
- Village
- Location within Poland
- Coordinates: 52°22′21″N 18°56′0″E
- Country: Poland
- Voivodeship: Greater Poland
- County: Koło
- Gmina: Przedecz

Population
  - Total: 30
- Time zone: UTC+1 (CET)
  - Summer (DST): UTC+2 (CEST)
- Vehicle registration: PKL

Rogóźno [rɔˈɡuʑnɔ] is a village in the administrative district of Gmina Przedecz, within Koło County, Greater Poland Voivodeship, in central Poland.
