= Jakuszowa =

- Village
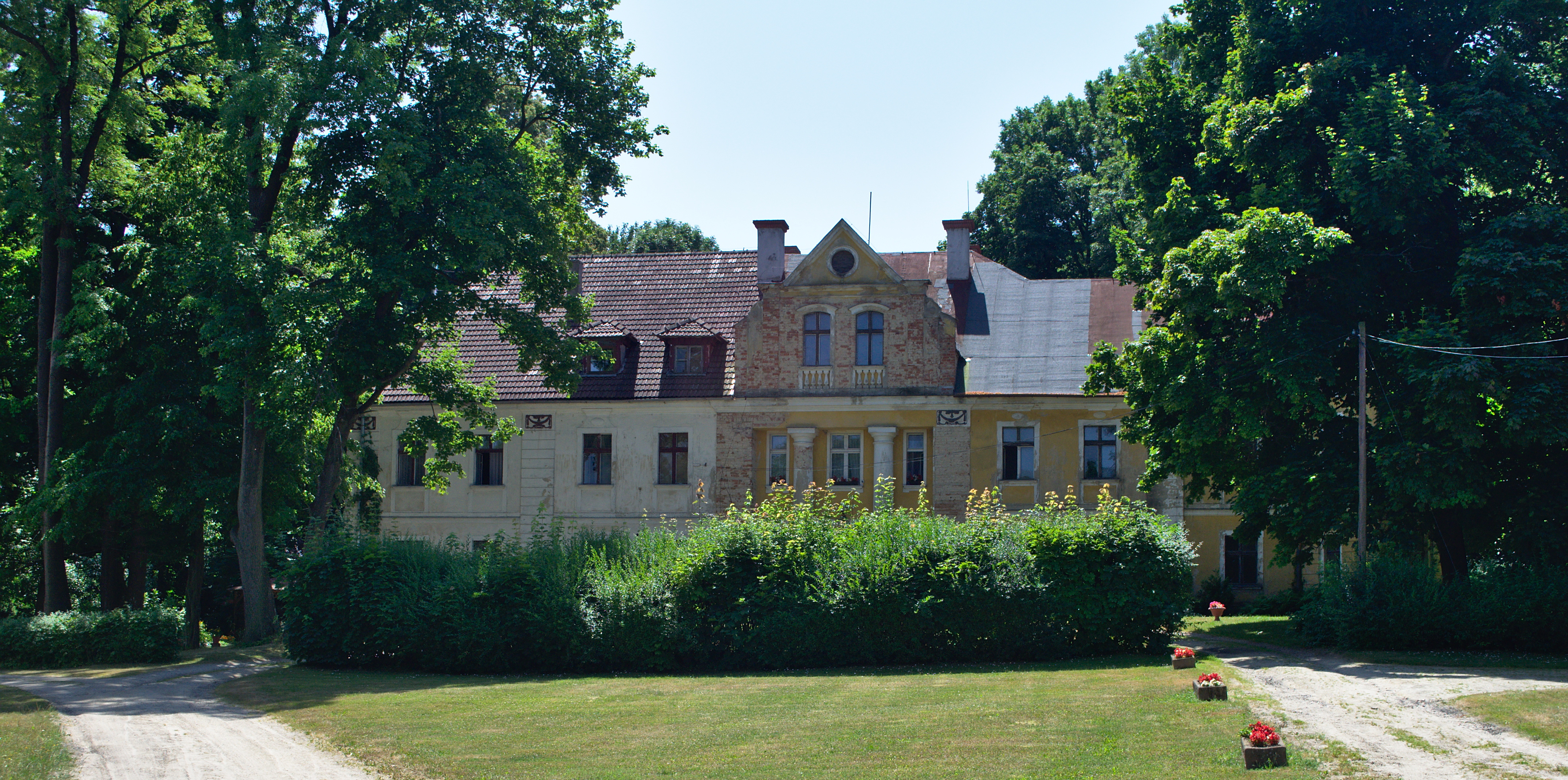
- Mansion in Jakuszowa

- Location within Poland
- Coordinates: 51°00′39″N 16°06′29″E
- Country: Poland
- Voivodeship: Lower Silesian
- County: Jawor
- Gmina: Paszowice
- Time zone: UTC+1 (CET)
  - Summer (DST): UTC+2 (CEST)
- Vehicle registration: DJA

Jakuszowa [jakuˈʂɔva] is a village in the administrative district of Gmina Paszowice, within Jawor County, Lower Silesian Voivodeship, in south-western Poland.
