= Bolkowice, Lower Silesian Voivodeship =

Bolkowice
- Village
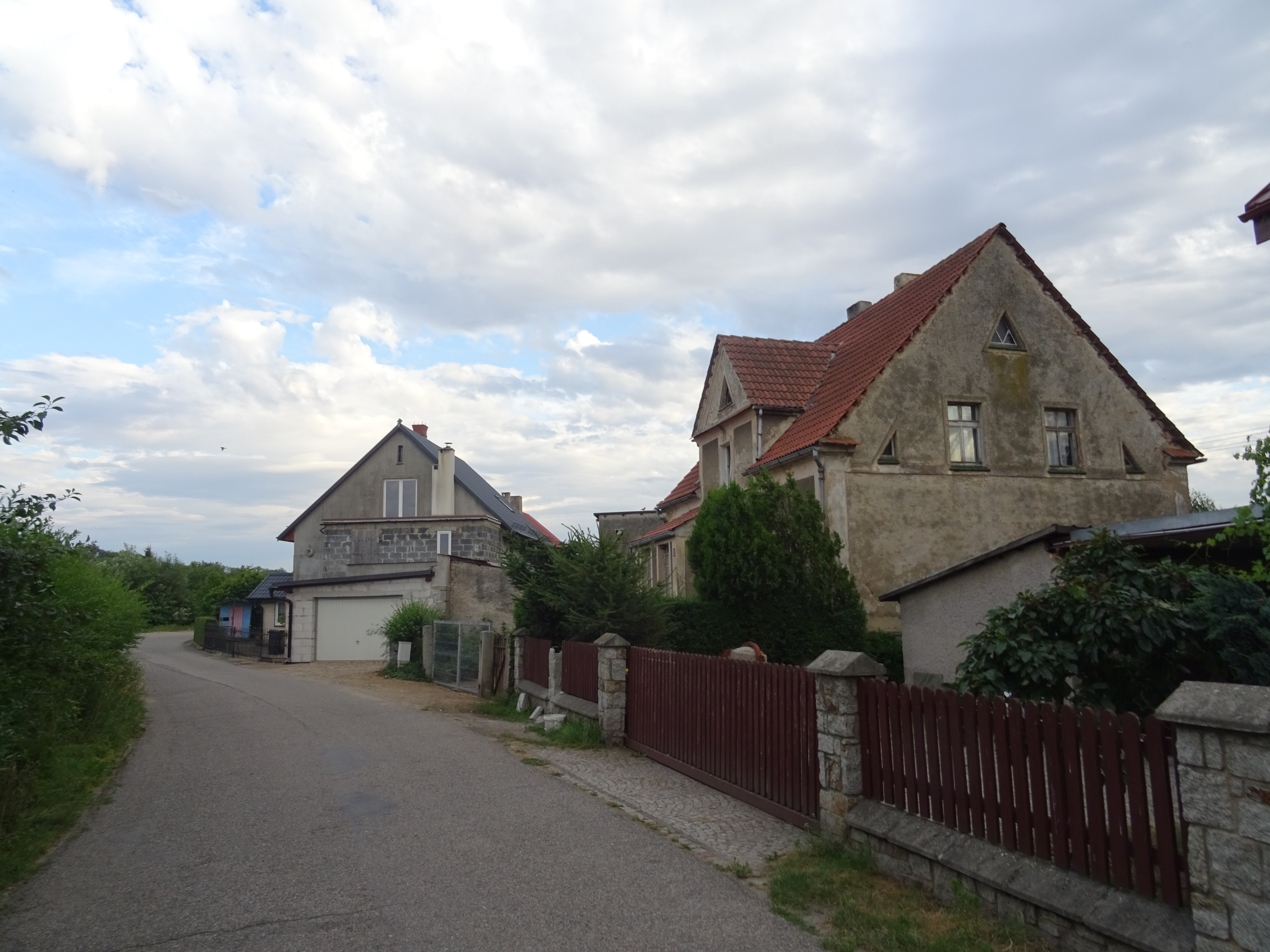
- Houses in Bolkowice

- Location within Poland
- Coordinates: 50°59′35″N 16°11′50″E
- Country: Poland
- Voivodeship: Lower Silesian
- Powiat: Jawor
- Gmina: Paszowice
- Time zone: UTC+1 (CET)
  - Summer (DST): UTC+2 (CEST)
- Vehicle registration: DJA

Bolkowice [bɔlkɔˈvit͡sɛ] is a village in the administrative district of Gmina Paszowice, within Jawor County, Lower Silesian Voivodeship, in south-western Poland.
