= Myślibórz, Lower Silesian Voivodeship =

Myślibórz
- Village
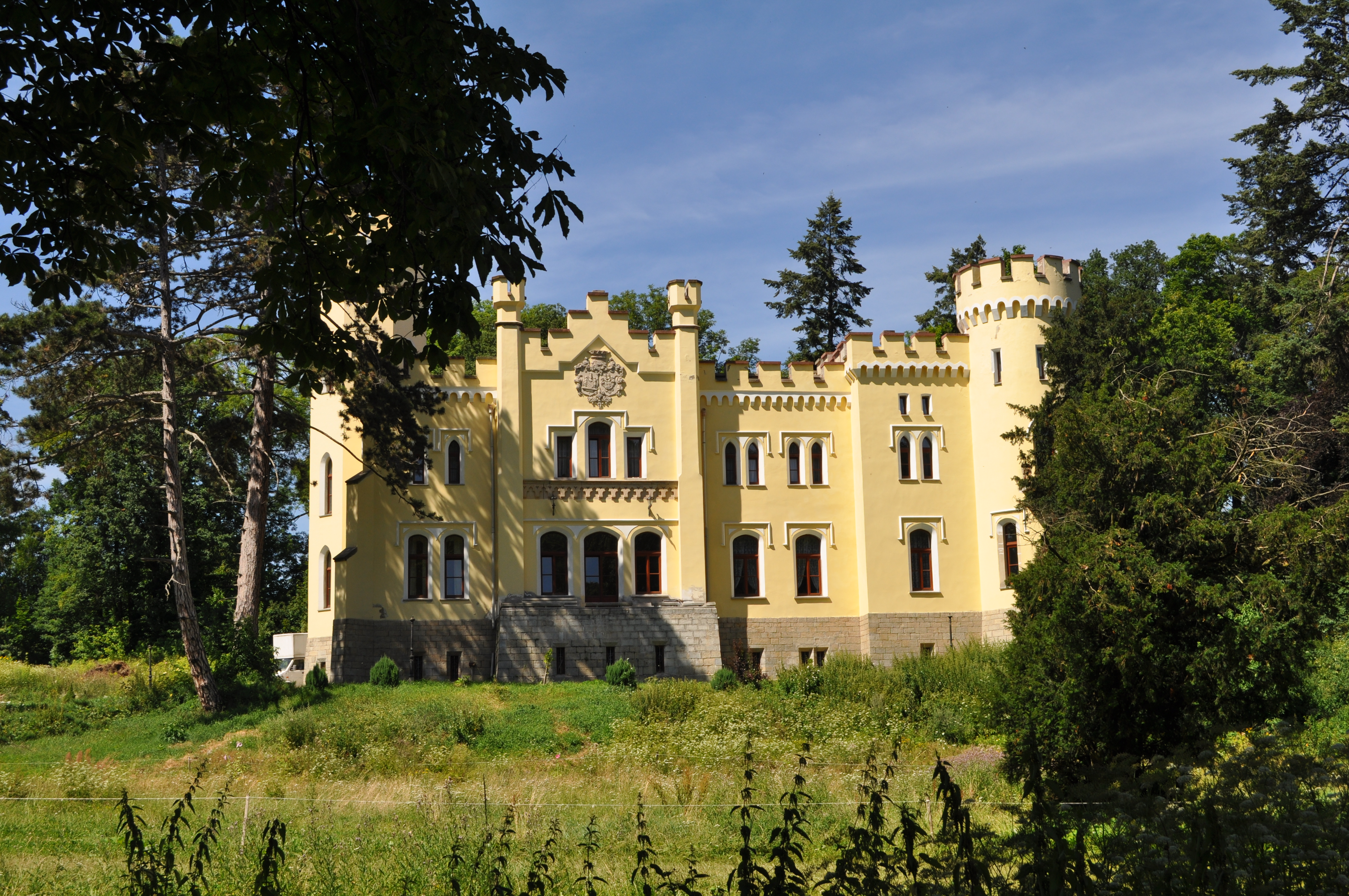
- Myślibórz Palace

- Location within Poland
- Coordinates: 51°01′29″N 16°07′04″E
- Country: Poland
- Voivodeship: Lower Silesian
- Powiat: Jawor
- Gmina: Paszowice

Population
  - Total: 130
- Time zone: UTC+1 (CET)
  - Summer (DST): UTC+2 (CEST)
- Vehicle registration: DJA

Myślibórz [mɨˈɕlibuʂ] is a village in the administrative district of Gmina Paszowice, within Jawor County, Lower Silesian Voivodeship, in south-western Poland.
