= Chrustowo, Koło County =

Chrustowo
- Village
- Location within Poland
- Coordinates: 52°22′35″N 18°56′46″E
- Country: Poland
- Voivodeship: Greater Poland
- County: Koło
- Gmina: Przedecz
- Time zone: UTC+1 (CET)
  - Summer (DST): UTC+2 (CEST)
- Vehicle registration: PKL

Chrustowo [xrusˈtɔvɔ] is a village in the administrative district of Gmina Przedecz, within Koło County, Greater Poland Voivodeship, in central Poland.

== History ==
Two Polish citizens were murdered by Nazi Germany in the village during World War II.
