= Gmina Przedecz =

Gmina Przedecz Przedecz Commune
- Gmina
- Coat of arms

- Coordinates (Przedecz): 52°19′50″N 18°54′19″E
- Country: Poland
- Voivodeship: Greater Poland
- County: Koło
- Seat: Przedecz

Area
  - Total: 76.52 km^{2} (29.54 sq mi)

Population (2006)
  - Total: 4,319
  - Density: 56.44/km^{2} (146.2/sq mi)
  - Urban: 1,771
  - Rural: 2,548
- Time zone: UTC+1 (CET)
  - Summer (DST): UTC+2 (CEST)
- Vehicle registration: PKL
- Website: http://www.przedecz.konin.lm.pl/

Gmina Przedecz is an urban-rural gmina (administrative district) in Koło County, Greater Poland Voivodeship, in central Poland. Its seat is the town of Przedecz, which lies approximately 21 kilometres (13 mi) north-east of Koło and 136 km (85 mi) east of the regional capital Poznań.

The gmina covers an area of 76.52 square kilometres (29.5 sq mi), and as of 2006 its total population is 4,319 (out of which the population of Przedecz amounts to 1,771, and the population of the rural part of the gmina is 2,548).

== Villages ==
Apart from the town of Przedecz, Gmina Przedecz contains the villages and settlements of Arkuszewo, Broniszewo, Chrustowo, Dziewczopólko, Dziwie, Holenderki, Jasieniec, Józefowo, Katarzyna, Kłokoczyn, Łączewna, Lipiny, Nowa Wieś Wielka, Rogóźno, Rybno, Zalesie, Żarowo, Zbijewo-Kolonia and Zbijewo-Parcele A.

== Neighbouring gminas ==
Gmina Przedecz is bordered by the gminas of Babiak, Chodecz, Chodów, Dąbrowice, Izbica Kujawska and Kłodawa.
