= Nowa Wieś Wielka, Lower Silesian Voivodeship =

Nowa Wieś Wielka
- Village
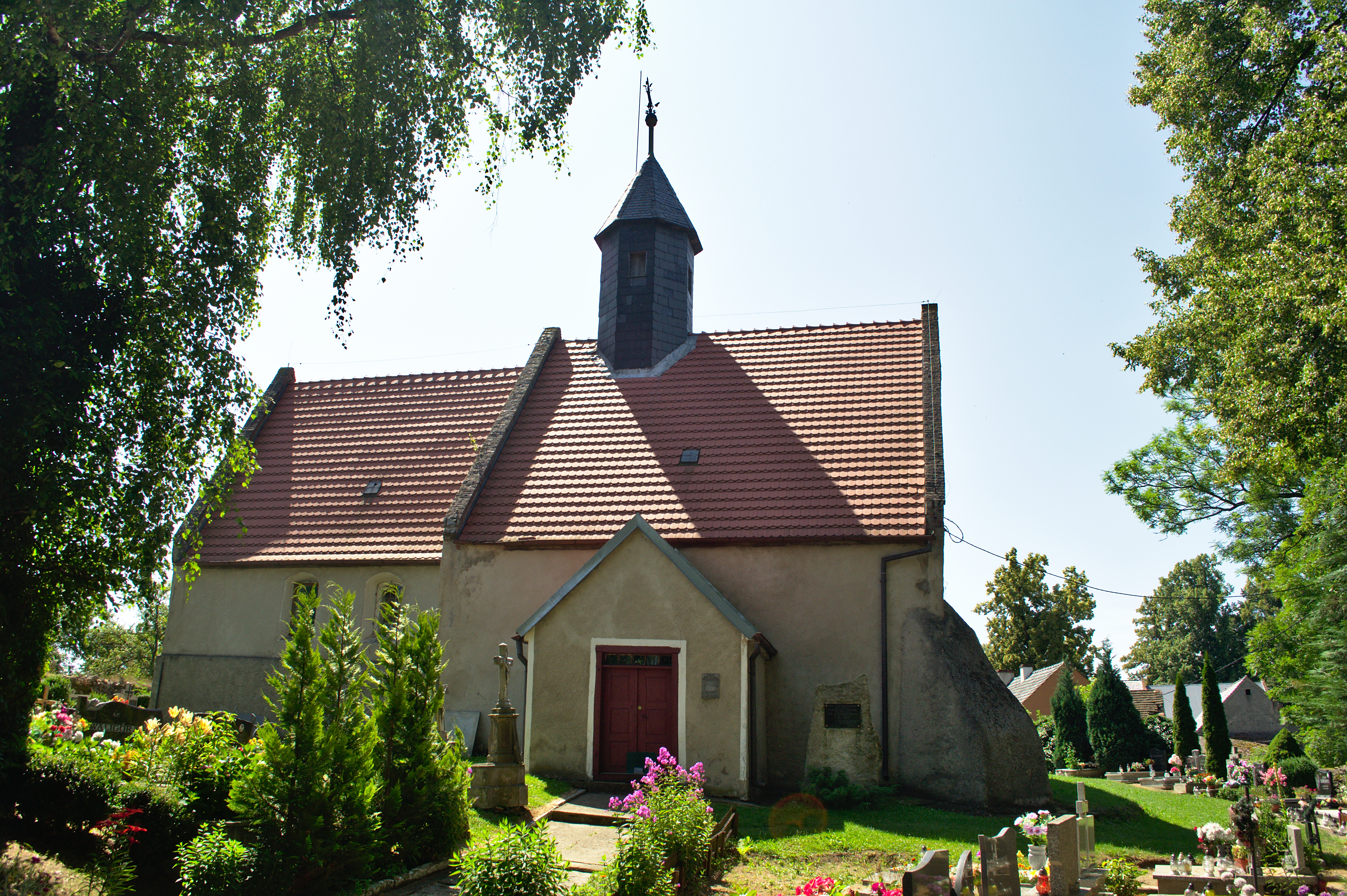
- Church in Nowa Wieś Wielka

- Location within Poland
- Coordinates: 50°59′25″N 16°02′37″E
- Country: Poland
- Voivodeship: Lower Silesian
- Powiat: Jawor
- Gmina: Paszowice
- Time zone: UTC+1 (CET)
  - Summer (DST): UTC+2 (CEST)
- Vehicle registration: DJA

Nowa Wieś Wielka [ˈnɔva ˈvjɛɕ ˈvjɛlka] is a village in the administrative district of Gmina Paszowice, within Jawor County, Lower Silesian Voivodeship, in south-western Poland.

== Gallery ==
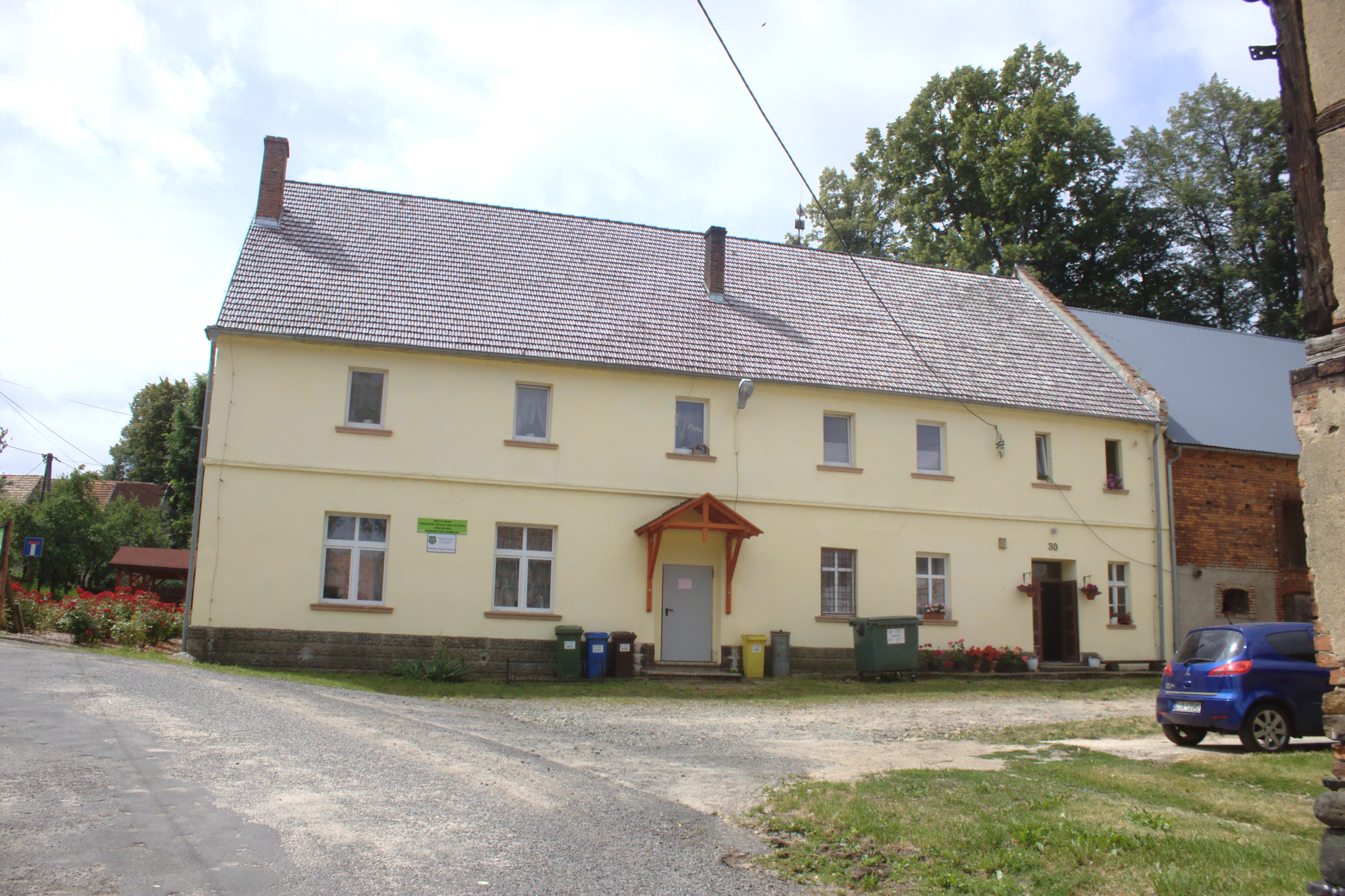
House on the village square

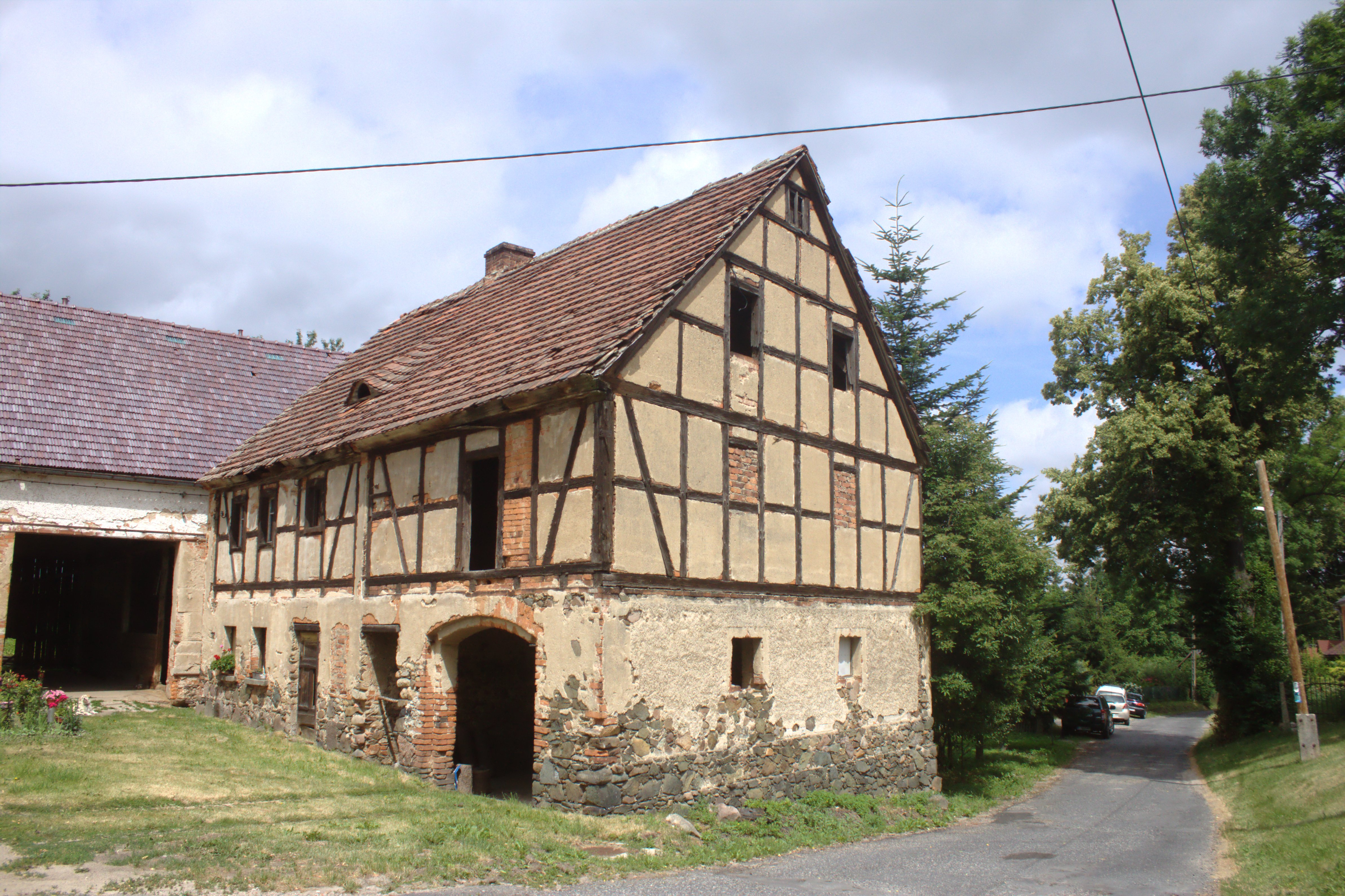
Half-timbered house

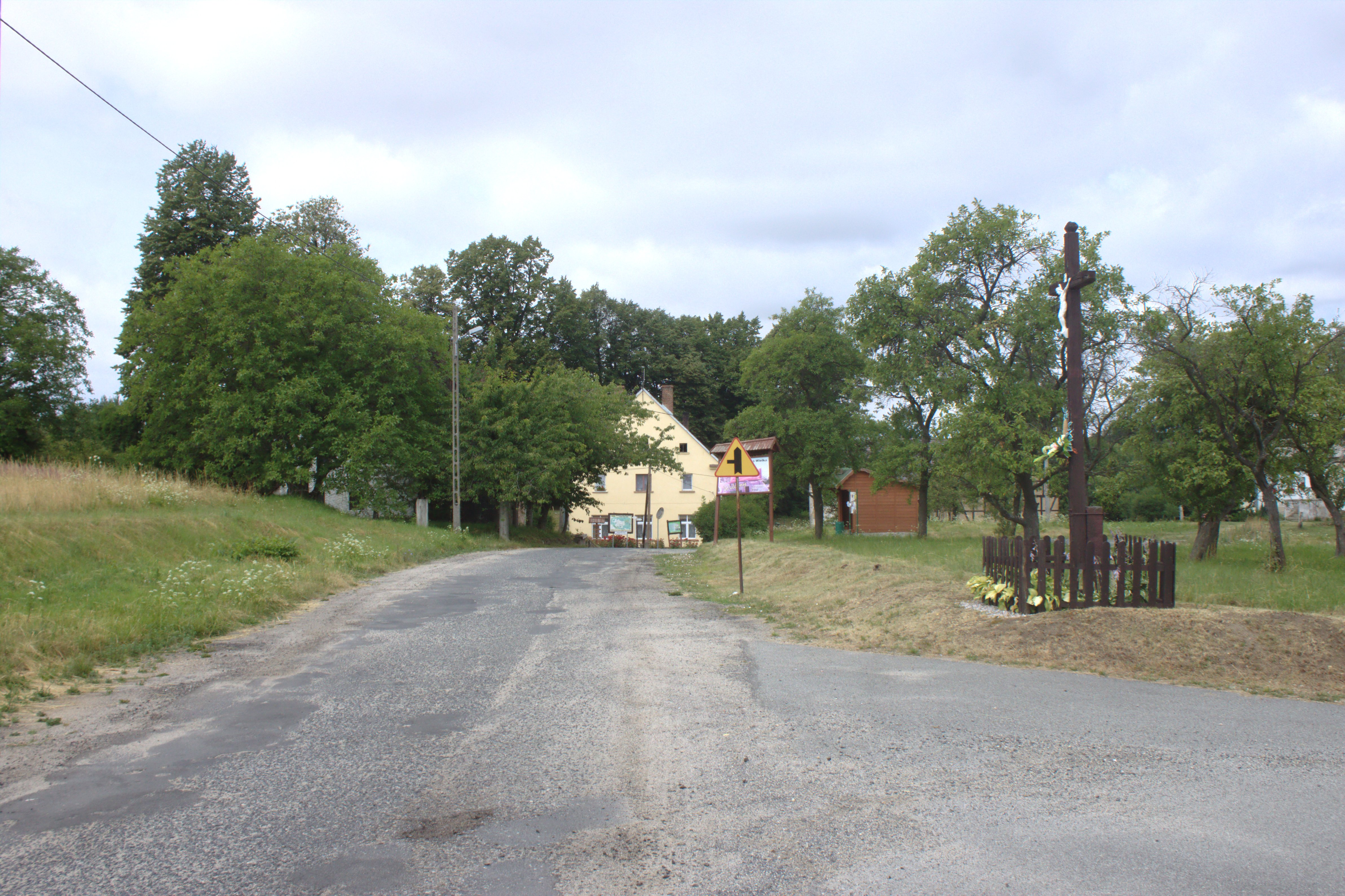
Street

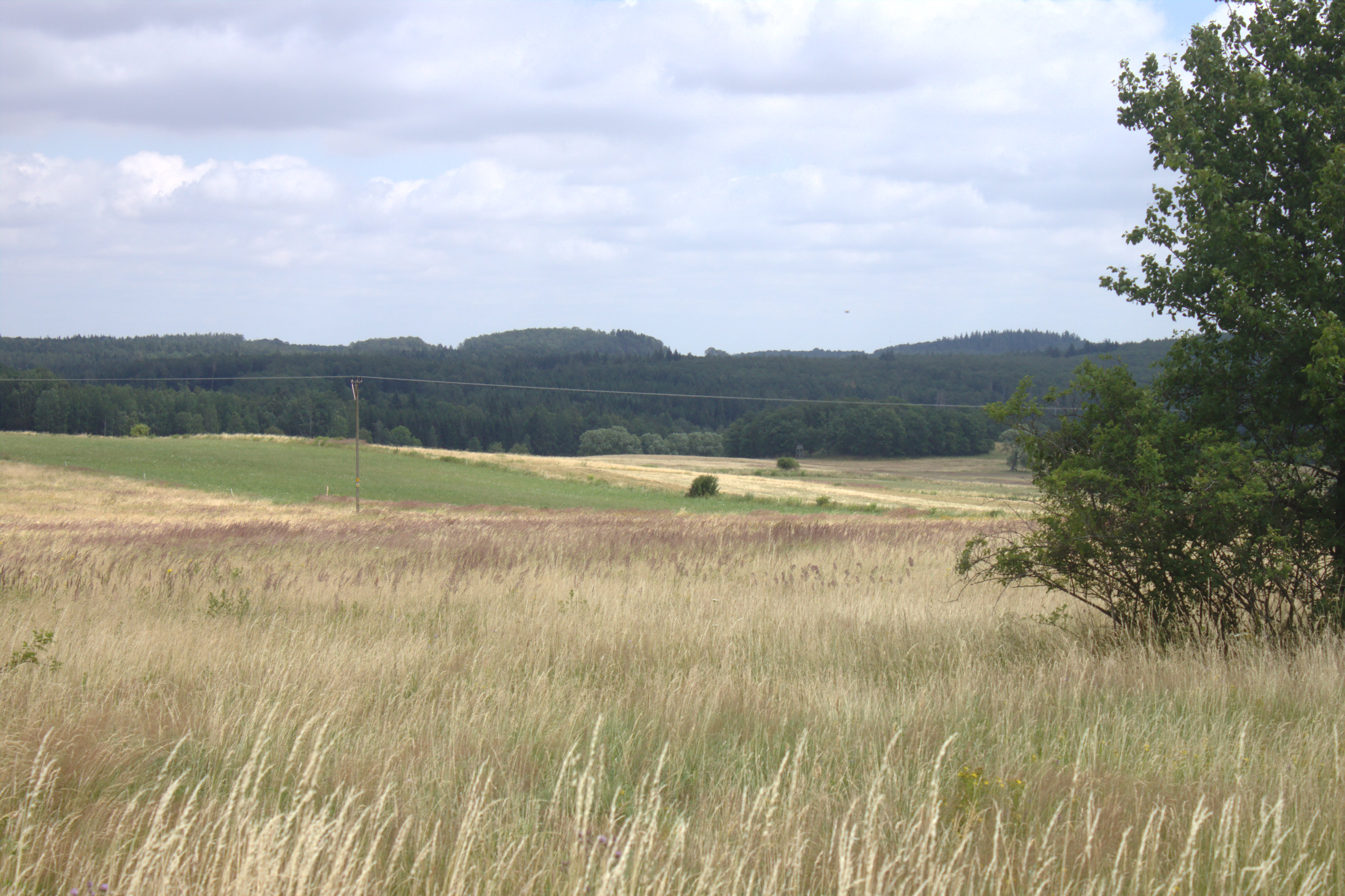
Surrounding countryside
