= Zębowice, Lower Silesian Voivodeship =

Zębowice
- Village
- Location within Poland
- Coordinates: 51°2′10″N 16°13′1″E
- Country: Poland
- Voivodeship: Lower Silesian
- County: Jawor
- Gmina: Paszowice
- Time zone: UTC+1 (CET)
  - Summer (DST): UTC+2 (CEST)
- Vehicle registration: DJA

Zębowice [zɛmbɔˈvit͡sɛ] is a village in the administrative district of Gmina Paszowice, within Jawor County, Lower Silesian Voivodeship, in south-western Poland.
