= Battle of the Katzbach =

1813 battle during the War of the Sixth Coalition

- Part of the German campaign of the Sixth Coalition
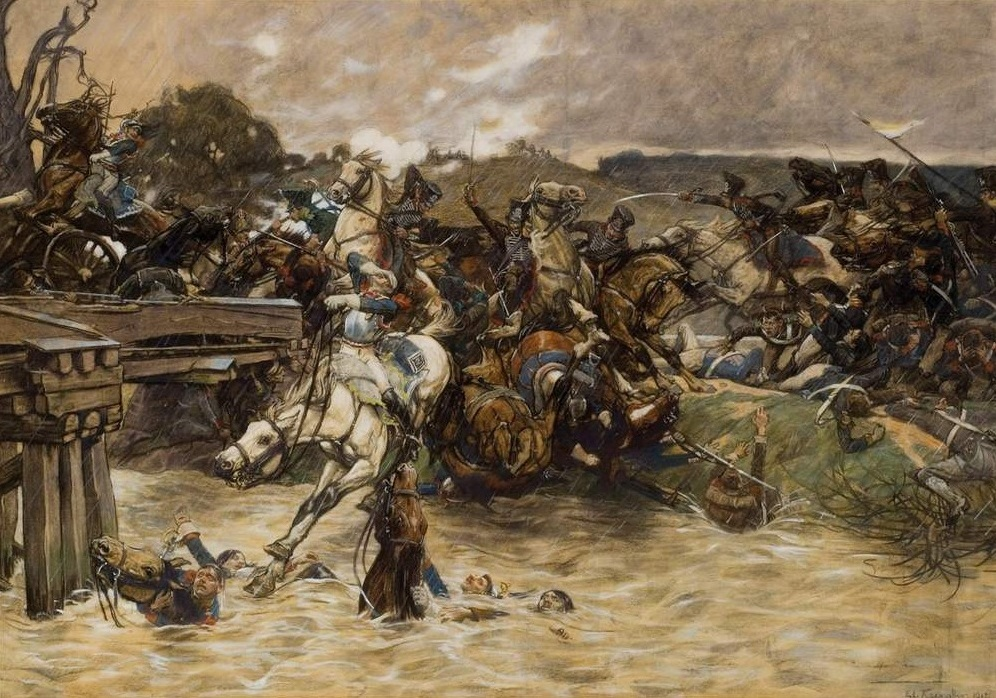
- Battle of the Katzbach by Eduard Kaempffer
Date	26 August 1813
Location	near Liegnitz, Prussia 51°06′17″N 16°05′57″E
Result	Russo-Prussian victory

Belligerents
Kingdom of Prussia; Russian Empire	(First French Empire) French Empire

Commanders and leaders
(Kingdom of Prussia) Gebhard von Blücher (Kingdom of Prussia) Ludwig Yorck (Russian Empire) Osten-Sacken	(First French Empire) Jacques MacDonald (First French Empire) Jacques Lauriston (First French Empire) François Bastien Sébastiani

Units involved
Army of Silesia	Army of the Bober

Strength
80,000–95,000	60,000–75,000

Casualties and losses
1,000 killed and wounded (battle) 22,000 (campaign)	Unknown casualties (battle) 30,000 (campaign); 103 guns
- Location within Europe

War of the Sixth Coalition:
German campaign
current battle
Napoleon in command
Napoleon not in command

The Battle of the Katzbach on 26 August 1813, was a major battle of the Napoleonic Wars between the forces of the First French Empire under Marshal MacDonald and a Russo-Prussian army of the Sixth Coalition under Prussian Marshal Graf (Count) von Blücher. It occurred during a heavy thunderstorm at the Katzbach river between Wahlstatt and Liegnitz in the Prussian province of Silesia. Taking place the same day as the Battle of Dresden, it resulted in a Coalition victory, with the French retreating to Saxony.

== Prelude ==
Blücher ordered the Army of Silesia to advance on 13 August, before the Truce of Pläswitz could conclude on 17 August. In a series of running fights, the Allied army beat back the confused French, who did not anticipate that the Allies would break the armistice so brazenly. These minor victories raised the morale of the inexperienced German levies. On the first day, Blücher and his chief of staff August Neidhardt von Gneisenau became separated and did not issue orders for troop movements until late in the day, slowing down the Allied advance. The French resistance grew in intensity, the Allied night marches multiplied owing to constant combat and delays, and the weather turned atrocious. On 20 August, Blücher's men came face-to-face Napoleon's main army at the Bober river and beat a hasty retreat when the cheers of the French troops announced the arrival of the French emperor.

For the next five days, the Silesian Army engaged in a series of fierce and costly rearguard actions against the pursuing French forces, which were personally commanded by Napoleon. Blücher lost 6,000–8,000 men in combat on 21, 22 and 23 August, while French losses since 17 August were about the same. Blücher's army began to fall apart. Ludwig Yorck von Wartenburg's corps lost 5,000 men to desertion. The Landwehr militiamen deserted en masse in entire battalions, while the Allied corps commanders complained of the ruin befalling their army thanks to the incompetence of its general staff. Blücher contemplated firing Gneisenau.

Napoleon returned to Saxony on 23 August with the Guard, I Corps, VI Corps and I Cavalry Corps to face Schwarzenberg's Army of Bohemia. That same day, he formed the 100,000-strong Army of the Bober under Marshal Jacques MacDonald and ordered him to drive Blucher to east of the Katzbach then pull back to the west bank of the Bober and assume defensive positions to protect the flank of the French armies in Saxony and near Berlin. MacDonald was also authorized to attack in case Blücher took the offensive. MacDonald did not move for 48 hours due to Marshal Michel Ney's misunderstanding of Napoleon's summon of Ney to Görlitz as referring to his entire three-division-strong III Corps. Late on 24 August, Ney turned over command to Joseph Souham, who spent 25 August moving his corps into MacDonald's line. In addition to the III Corps, MacDonald had under his command the V Corps, XI Corps and II Cavalry Corps.

When Blücher on 24 August learned that Napoleon was no longer in direct command of the pursuers, he at 7 pm that day ordered his army to turn back and use cavalry reconnaissance to find the enemy on 25 August. At 11 pm on 25 August, MacDonald issued orders to move his army to the town of Jauer the next day and defeat Blücher or drive him deeper into Silesia. MacDonald's courier reached Souham four and one-half hours late. Souham then moved his corps at 11.30 am to Kroitsch rather than Liegnitz, which meant that only one division from the corps would participate in the battle.

== Battle ==
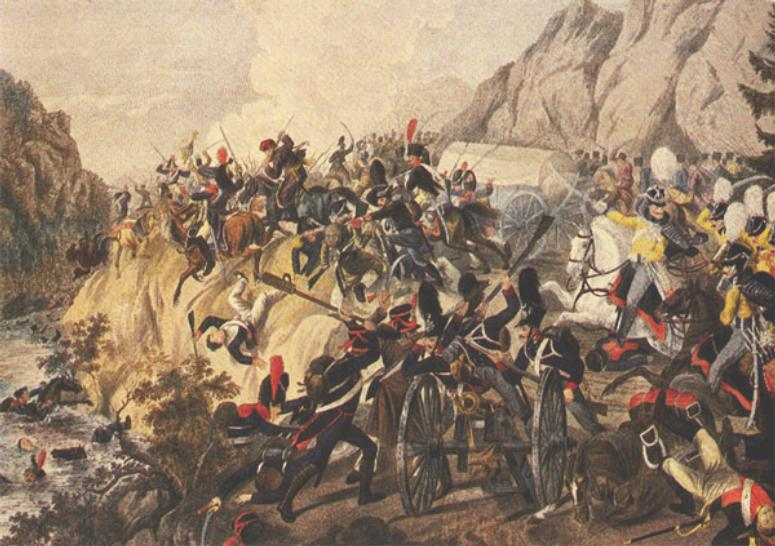
Battle of Katzbach by Klein. Prussian troops force the French into the river.

The two armies stumbled upon one another at 9 am after MacDonald crossed the swollen Katzbach river. A sudden flood cut away many of the bridges and destroyed the fords. In the midst of the confusion and heavy rain, MacDonald seemed to recover first. Although his orders were to defend the flank of Napoleon's main force from Blücher, MacDonald decided to attack. He dispatched two-thirds of his army, about 60,000 men, in an attempt to flank the Russo-Prussian right. But confusion reigned again as the French columns found themselves too far apart to support one another.

Blücher ordered his right-wing to advance. The muskets were too wet for firing and the battle was decided with cold steel. The remaining 30,000 men of MacDonald's force, who were supposed to hold down the Coalition forces, were met by a heavy counter-attack by Prussian cavalry. Without support or reinforcement, the French II Cavalry Corps, Brayer's 8th Division from III Corps and Meunier's 2nd brigade were routed at 6.30 pm by Blücher's entire army. The remnants of MacDonald's army retreated, with hundreds drowning in the Katzbach and the Raging Neisse which were in spate.

== Aftermath ==
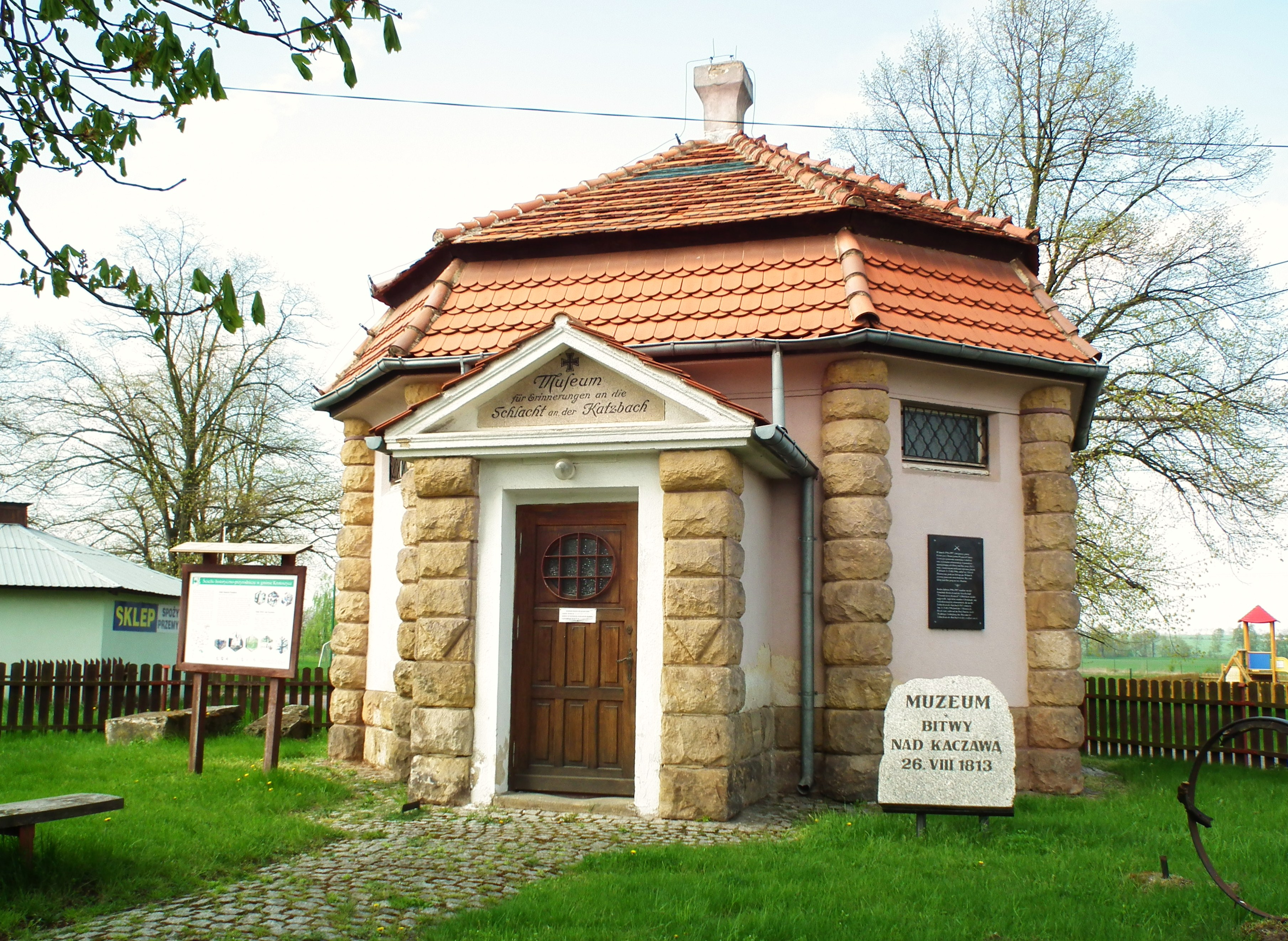
Museum of the battle, located in the village of Dunino.

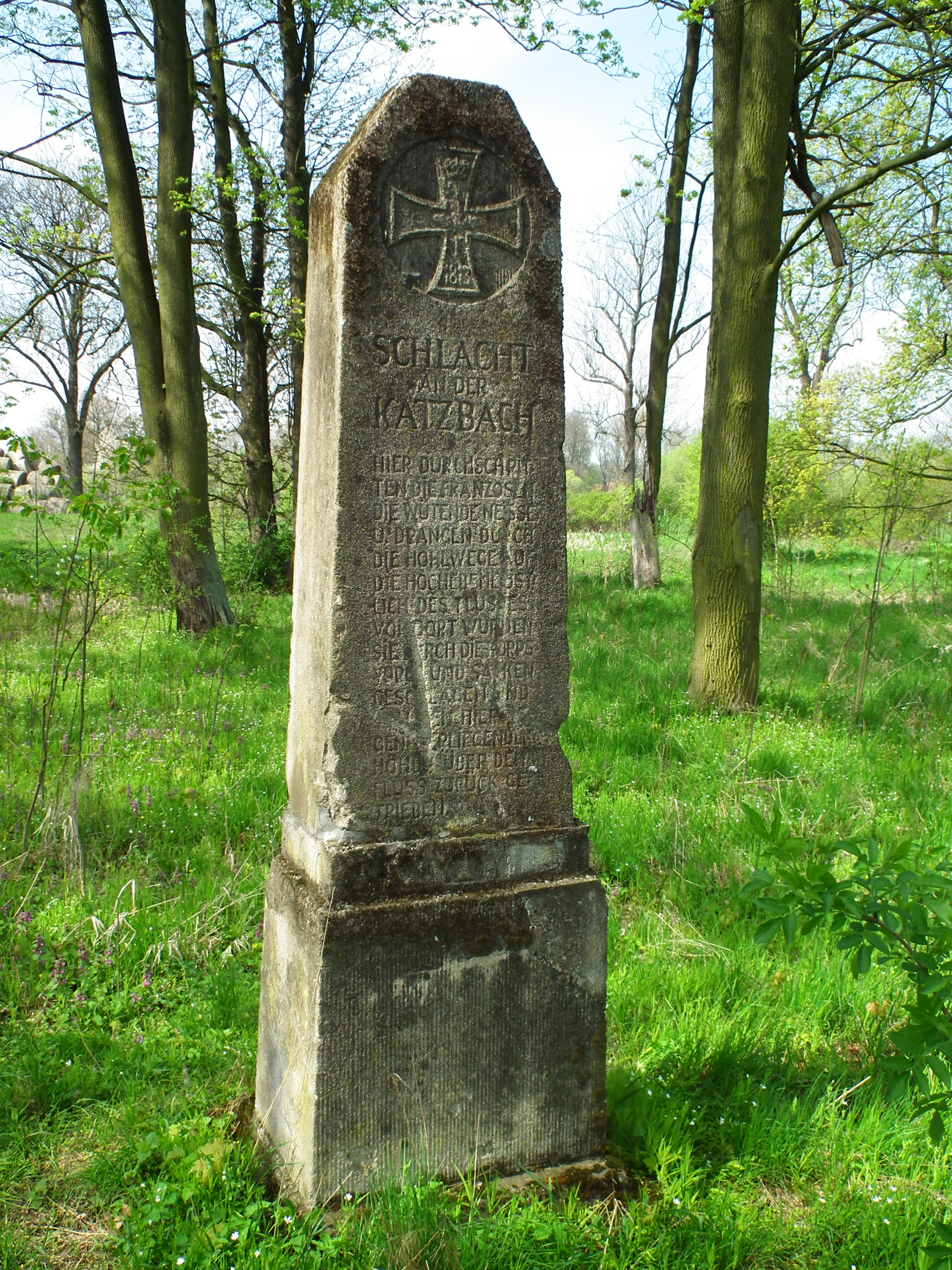
Memorial stone; it reads, in German, "Here the French crossed the Raging Neisse and were repulsed, many of them drowning in the flooding river."

=== Casualties ===
MacDonald's casualties on 26 August are unknown but by 1 September he had lost 30,000 men and 103 guns, including 12,000 killed and wounded and 18,000 captured. Blücher's losses were some 1,000 men killed and wounded in the battle and 22,000 for the campaign.

=== Analysis ===
Beyond the battle losses, the French strategic position had been weakened. Austria might have defected from the Allied coalition after Napoleon's victory at Dresden on 26–27 August. News of Blücher's triumph revitalized the worried Allied leadership. This, coupled with the defeats at Kulm, four days later, and Dennewitz on 6 September, would more than negate Napoleon's victory at Dresden.

Because of his victory, Blücher received the title of "Prince of Wahlstatt" on 3 June 1814.

The battle gave rise to a German saying, now obsolete: "Der geht ran wie Blücher an der Katzbach!" ("He's advancing like Blücher at Katzbach!"), referring to Blücher and describing vigorous, forceful behavior.

== Notes ==
Preceded by Battle of Großbeeren	Napoleonic Wars; Battle of the Katzbach	Succeeded by Battle of Dresden
