= Raging Neisse =

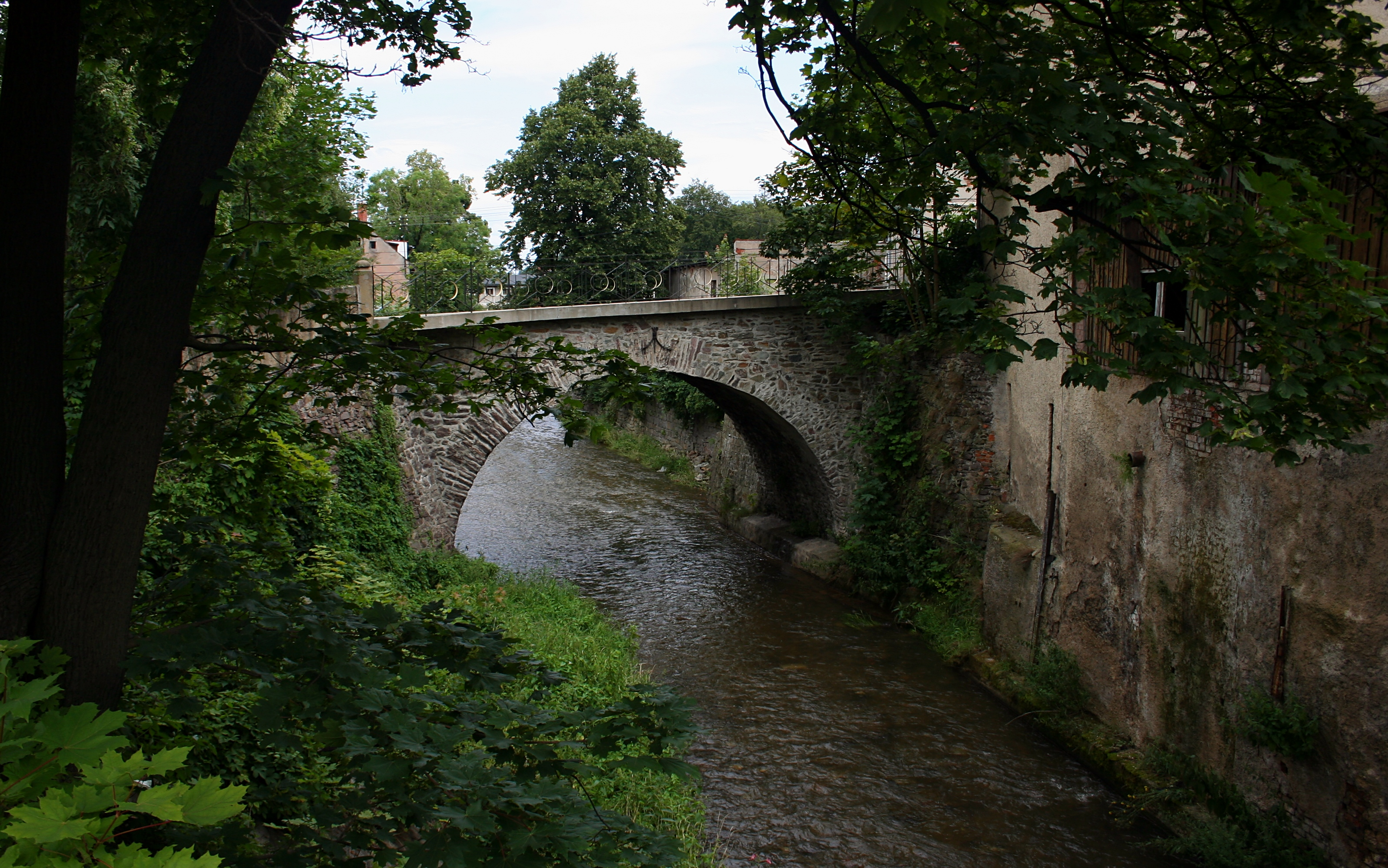
- The Raging Neisse in Bolków

Location
- Country: Poland
- Region: Lower Silesian Voivodeship

Physical characteristics
- Source
  - location: Origin: Confluence of two streams on the western side of the Kokosz in the Wałbrzych Mountains
  - coordinates: 50°51′40″N 16°04′30″E
  - elevation: 598 m n.p.m.
- Mouth
  - location: near Dunino (Gmina Krotoszyce) into the Kaczawa
  - coordinates: 51°09′23″N 16°04′35″E
  - elevation: 136 m n.p.m.
- Length: 51 km

Basin features
- Progression: Kaczawa→ Oder→ Baltic Sea
- Landmarks: Large towns: Jawor; Small towns: Bolków
- Waterbodies: Lakes: Słup Lake

The Raging Neisse (Note: Neisse is pronounced "nicer".) (Polish: Nysa Szalona, German: Wütende Neiße or Jauersche Neiße) is a river in Poland. It has a length of about 51 kilometres (32 mi) and flows into the Kaczawa, which in turn flows into the Oder. Its largest tributary is the Little Neisse.

The Raging Neisse rises at a height of 600 metres (2,000 ft) on the western side of a mountain called the Kokosz on the Wałbrzych Heights. It flows down through the lowlands among the foothills of the Sudetes and the heights of Chojnów, through the towns of Bolków and Jawor. It then merges with the Kaczawa at a height of 141 metres (463 ft) not far from Jawor near the village of Dunino.

The fact that the Neisse runs through hilly terrain for almost its entire length results in that during heavy rainfall, the water level in the river can suddenly rise up even to 2 meters, hence its name – the Raging Neisse

== Napoleonic Wars ==
The river became famous as a result of the Battle of Katzbach when fleeing French troops being pursued by Marschall Blücher were driven into the Katzbach and Raging Neisse rivers which were swollen as the result of a thunderstorm.

== Literature ==
- Rose, John Holland (2018). The Life of Napoleon I. Vol. 2. Vachendorf. ISBN 978-1-5378-0950-2. OCLC 1189312780.
- Henderson, Ernest F. (2015). Blücher And The Uprising Of Prussia Against Napoleon, 1806-1815.
- Dodge, Lt. Col. Theodore Ayrault Dodge (2014). Napoleon: a History of the Art of War. [1907]
