= Krajów =

Krajów may refer to the following places in Poland:

- Krajów, Lower Silesian Voivodeship (south-west Poland)
- Krajów, Masovian Voivodeship (east-central Poland)
