= Bolków Castle =

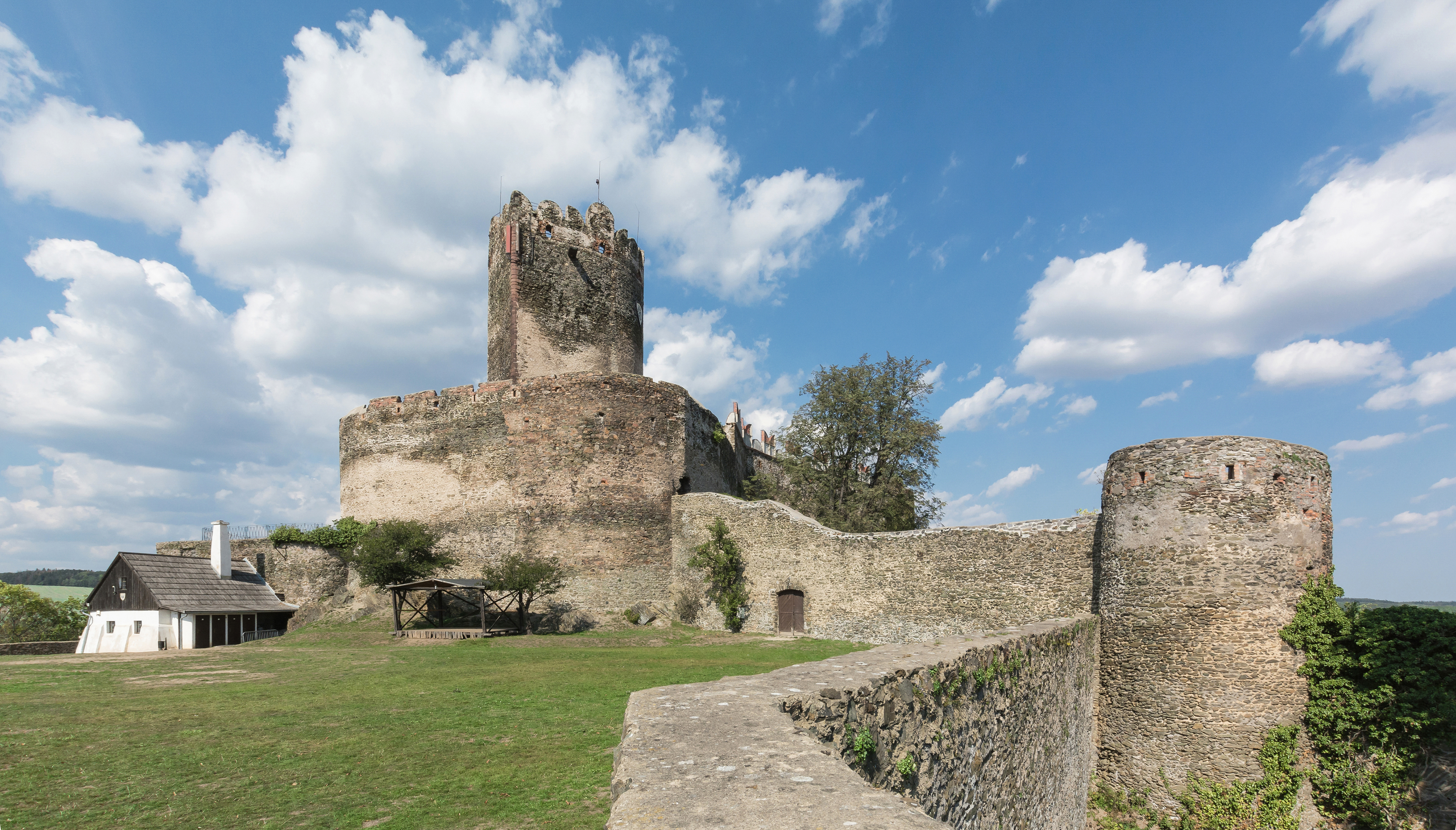
- Bolków Castle

- Location of the Bolków Castle in Poland Bolków Castle (Lower Silesian Voivodeship)
- 50°55′18″N 16°05′52″E
- Location: Bolków, Lower Silesian Voivodeship, Poland

History
- Built: 1277-1293
- Rebuilt: 1301-1368; 1539-1540; 1715, 1922

Site notes
- Area: 7,600 m^{2} (82,000 sq ft)
- Architectural style: Gothic

Bolków Castle is a castle located in Bolków on the Castle Hill (Polish: Wzgórze Zamkowe), with a 396 metres, where the hillside is cut by the Nysa Szalona river, with a sharp precipice (with a sudden drop of 90 metres); the eastern side of the hill gradually lowers, taken up by the town. The castle is an upland stronghold, covering an area of 7600 m^{2}. The castle is located in Bolków (30 km to the north-west of Wałbrzych), Lower Silesian Voivodeship; in Poland.

== History ==
The monumental Piast dynasty castle in Bolków is one of the largest fortresses of the Świdnica-Jawor Duchy. This stronghold, erected in the 13th century, defended nearby trade routes. Its monumental walls are still very impressive, stirring the imagination. This fortress is testimony to the dramatic history of this part of Central Europe.

The first mention of the castle comes from 1277, where prince Bolesław II of Legnica writes about it. Bolków Castle was built on the order of the Prince of Legnica, Bolesław II the Horned, known as Łysy, and later expanded by his son Bolko I The Strict, the prince of Świdnica and Jawor. On the initiative of Bolko I, a number of strongholds were expanded to control the passages from the Czech Republic to Silesia through the Sudeten range. This contributed to maintaining the independence of the Świdnica-Jawor Duchy until the end of the 14th century (the longest among all Silesian principalities). In the mid-14th century, the castle was connected with the city fortification system, its southern and south-eastern corners were connected with the city walls. In the Piast times, the castle's residents were ducal burgraves, such as: Logau, Schaffgotsch, Schweinichen, and Salza. In the years 1301-1368, during the reign of princes Bernard of Świdnica and Bolko II the Small (from 1353), the castle was enlarged. According to historians, from the time of Bolko II, for about 100 years, the castle served as a treasury, which was later transferred to Prague.

Bolko II was childless, therefore he adopted the daughter of his deceased brother Henry II, Anna, and made her heir to the principality. On May 27, 1353, Anna married the Czech King Charles IV. On July 3, Bolko II bequeathed the principalities to Anna and Charles IV, under the condition that he or his wife Agnes of Austria would be able to rule them until their death. In 1392, the castle became the property of the Czech kings and were incorporated into Bohemia. The city was destroyed during the Hussite attacks, but the castle was not conquered.

In 1463, the Czech king, George of Poděbrady, imprisoned the knight Hans von Tschirnhaus, who became famous in the area for robberies. This was the reason why the burghers of Wrocław and Świdnica organized an armed expedition to the castle under the leadership of Guncel II Świnka in 1468. In 1491, the castle was besieged by Bohemian king Vladislaus II of Hungary [2].

At the beginning of the 16th century, thanks to Emperor Ferdinand I, the castle was handed over to the Wrocław bishop for life. The bishop, on the order of the monarch, undertook the expansion of the castle. In the years 1539-1540, the castle was rebuilt under the leadership of the Lombard architect Jakub Parr. First of all, the fortified area was enlarged. Courtyards were built, surrounded by walls and bastions, in the south-west part and on the town side. These fortifications were connected with two town towers. The tower was crenellated in the form of dovetails. After the bishop's death in 1543, the castle was transferred to his family as a fief. From 1570, the owner of the castle was Matthias von Logau. In 1596, the castle passed into the hands of the Zedlitz family. In 1640 (during the Thirty Years' War) the castle was besieged. In 1646, it was taken over by the Swedish army.

The castle's current shape was reached through various constructions in the sixteenth century, the famous Silesian architect Jakub Parr brought elements of the Renaissance into the castle's fortifications. After the construction and expansion, the castle had a total area of 7600 m^{2}, making it one of the largest castles in Silesia.

In 1703, the castle in Bolków was bought by Cistercian monks from Krzeszów. Since then, the castle has remained uninhabited. In 1715, the Cistercians completed the interior reconstruction; By an edict of October 30, 1810, the castle becomes the property of the Prussian State Treasury (secularization). During this time, the building begins to fall into ruin. In 1813, after the Napoleonic Wars, Russian soldiers stayed in the castle. Searching for the legendary gold, they dug a hole at the base of the tower to get to the hunger dungeon. In 1885, the authorities allowed the demolition of part of the walls, and the obtained material was used to repair the roads. On March 10, 1913, the mayor of Bolków (Feige) appoints the Verein für Heimatpflege (Bolków Regional Society), which was to revive tourism. However, the outbreak of the war did not allow the plan to be implemented. In 1922, the House of Women was rebuilt, the ground floor was turned into a youth hostel, and the first floor was transformed into a regional museum. After Hitler came to power, the castle became the property of the state. It is assumed that the castle housed a research center supervising nearby factories.

== See also ==
- Castles in Poland

== Bibliography ==
- Marek Żukow-Karczewski, Zamek w Bolkowie - warownia Piastów świdnicko-jaworowskich / Bolków castle: A fortress of the Piast dynasty from Świdnica-Jawor, "Aura" 12, 1996.
