= Kościelec =

Kościelec may refer to the following places in Poland:

== Mountains ==
- Kościelec, 2155 m a.s.l., a mountain in Polish part of High Tatras (south Poland)
- Kościelec, 1019 m a.s.l., a mountain in Polish part of Silesian Beskids (south Poland)

== Villages and towns ==
- Kościelec, Kalisz County in Greater Poland Voivodeship (west-central Poland)
- Kościelec, Koło County in Greater Poland Voivodeship (west-central Poland)
- Kościelec, Kuyavian-Pomeranian Voivodeship (north-central Poland)
- Kościelec, Lesser Poland Voivodeship (south Poland)
- Kościelec, Lower Silesian Voivodeship (south-west Poland)
- Kościelec, Pomeranian Voivodeship (north Poland)
- Kościelec, Silesian Voivodeship (south Poland)
