= Słup Lake =

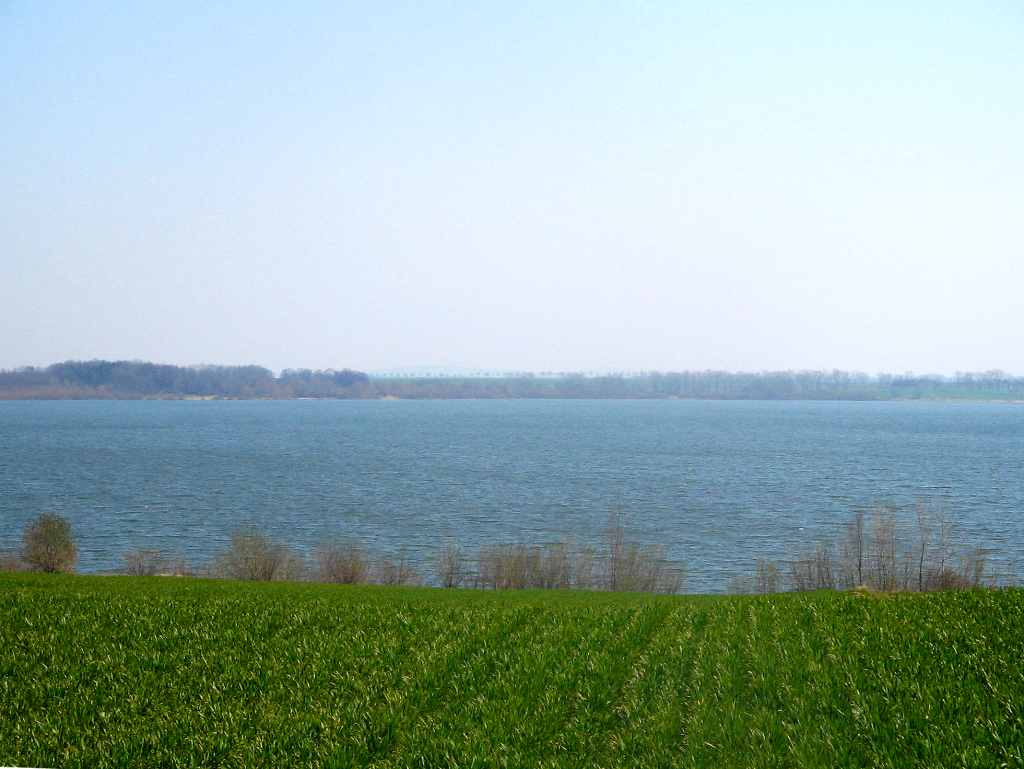
- Słup Lake

- Location within Lower Silesian Voivodeship
- Coordinates: 51°05′54″N 16°07′33″E
- Type: lake
- Primary inflows: Nysa Szalona
- Primary outflows: Nysa Szalona
- Basin countries: Poland
- Surface area: 4.9 km^{2} (1.9 sq mi)
- Max. depth: 20 m (66 ft)
- Water volume: 38.4×10^{6} m^{3} (31,100 acre⋅ft)

Słup Lake is a retention reservoir located on the channel of the Raging Neisse river, located in the Sudeten Upland (Podgórze Sudeckie) in the Lower Silesian Voivodeship; 1 km to the north-west of the city of Jawor. It was finished in 1978.
