= Dunino =

Coordinates: 56.2886°N 2.7432°W

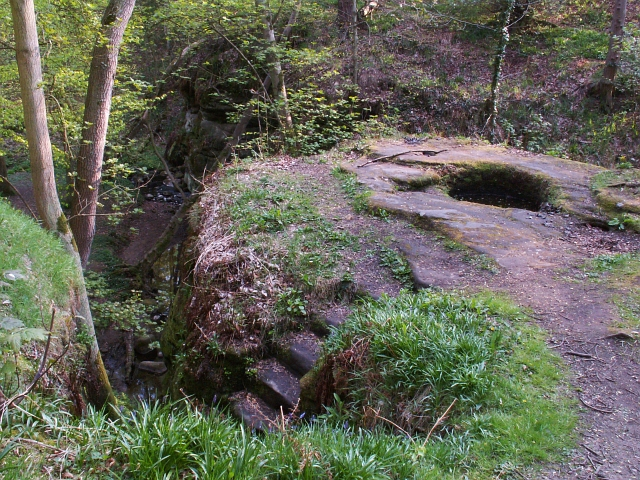
- Dunino Den

- Location within Fife
- Population: < 100
- OS grid reference: NO5311
- Council area: Fife
- Country: Scotland
- Sovereign state: United Kingdom
- Post town: ST ANDREWS
- Postcode district: KY16
- Dialling code: 01334
- Police: Scotland
- Fire: Scottish
- Ambulance: Scottish

See also Dunino, Poland.

Dunino is a village and parish in the East Neuk of Fife. It is 10 km from the nearest town, St Andrews, and 8 km from the fishing village of Anstruther. It is a small village with no local shops or services. It had one primary school which was closed down in 2014.

The civil parish has a population of 134 (in 2011).

Dunino Den, an ancient site of pagan and druidic worship is situated nearby.

The name derives from the Gaelic word for "fort of the assembly place" (dùn) and "assembly" (aonach).

Brian Sayers lived here while earning his Masters of Letters from University of Saint Andrews

== Bibliography ==
- Groome, Francis, Hindes (1882). "Dunino". Ordnance gazetteer of Scotland : a survey of Scottish topography, statistical, biographical, and historical. Vol. 2. Edinburgh: T.C. Jack. p. 434.
- Lewis, Samuel (1851). A topographical dictionary of Scotland, comprising the several counties, islands, cities, burgh and market towns, parishes, and principal villages, with historical and statistical descriptions: embellished with engravings of the seals and arms of the different burghs and universities. Vol. 1. London: S. Lewis and co. pp. 338-339.
- Roger, James (1845). The new statistical account of Scotland. Edinburgh and London: William Blackwood and Sons. pp. 356-374.
- Scott, Hew (1925). Fasti ecclesiae scoticanae; the succession of ministers in the Church of Scotland from the reformation. Vol. 5. Edinburgh: Oliver and Boyd. p. 196.
- Taylor, Simon; Márkus, Gilbert. The Place-Names of Fife. Vol. 3. Donington: Tyas. p. 249.
- West, William (1791). "Parish of Denino". The statistical account of Scotland. Drawn up from the communications of the ministers of the different parishes. Vol. 11. Edinburgh: Printed and sold by William Creech. pp. 352-367.
