= Wilczyce, Legnica County =

Wilczyce
- Village
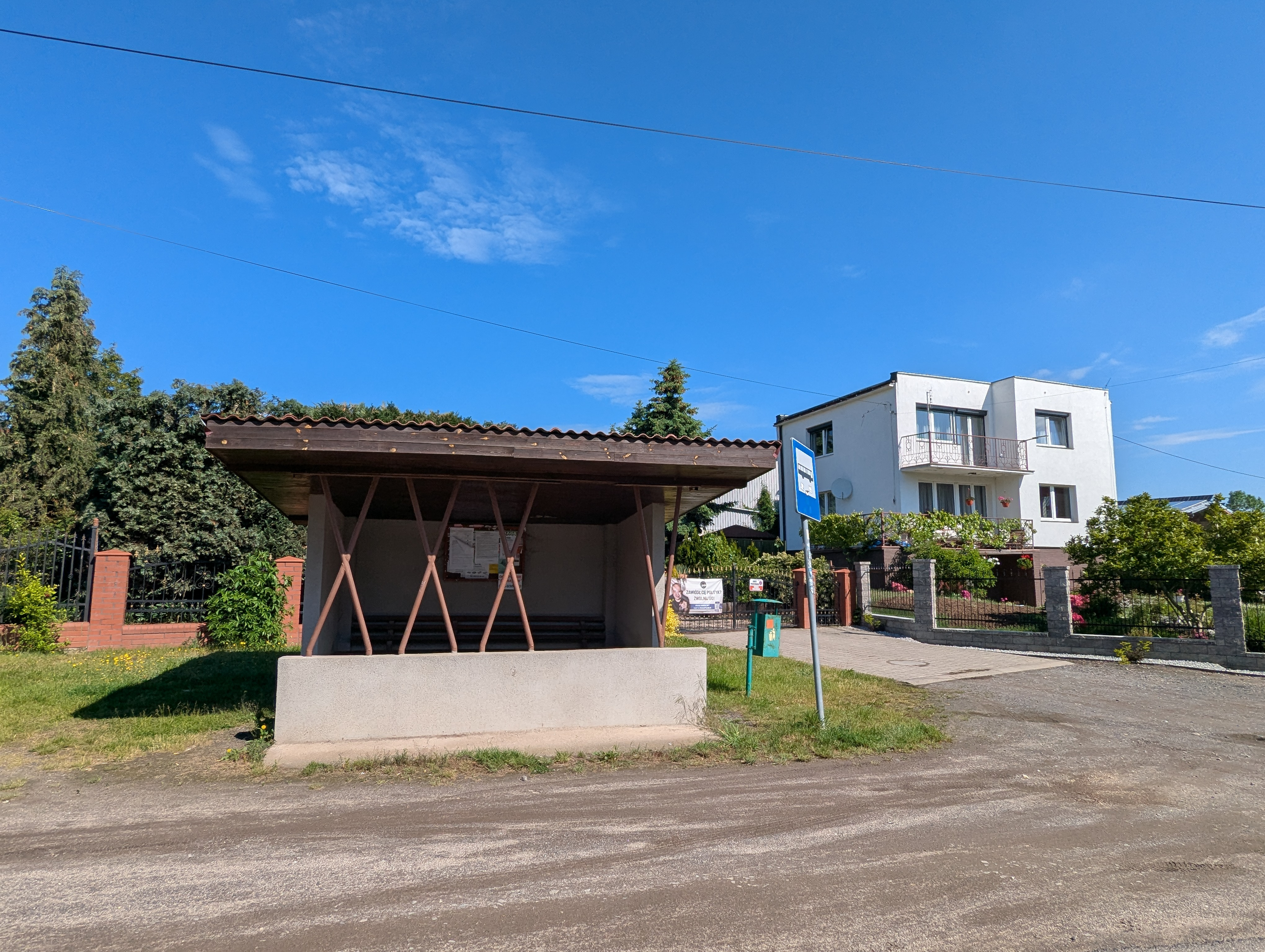

- Location within Poland
- Coordinates: 51°9′49″N 16°3′3″E
- Country: Poland
- Voivodeship: Lower Silesian
- County: Legnica
- Gmina: Krotoszyce

Wilczyce [vilˈt͡ʂɨt͡sɛ] is a village in the administrative district of Gmina Krotoszyce, within Legnica County, Lower Silesian Voivodeship, in south-western Poland.
