= Kaczawa =

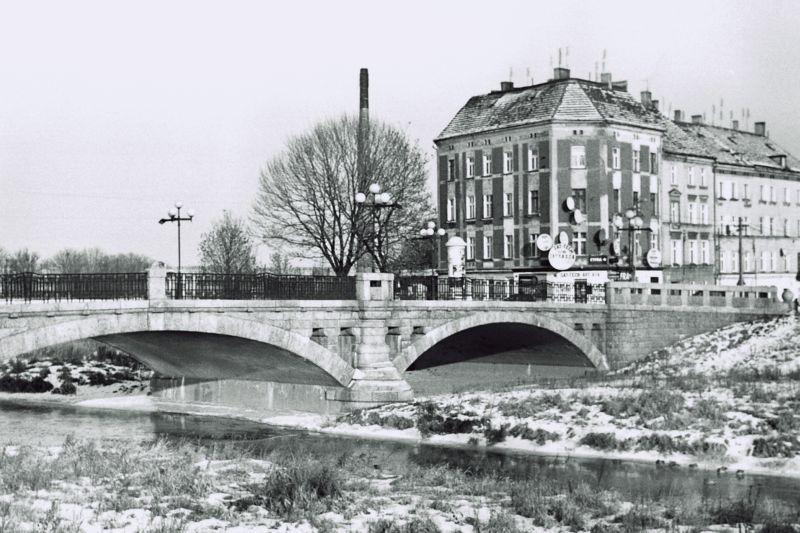
- The bridge over the River Kaczawa in Legnica

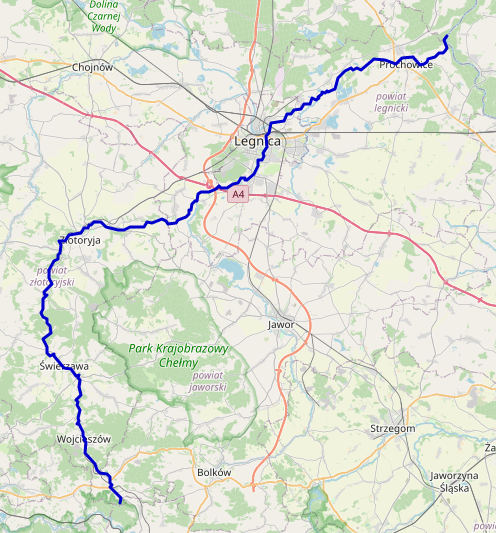
- Map of the Kaczawa; the river flows northwards

Location
- Country: Poland

Physical characteristics
- Source
  - location: Kaczawskie Mountains
- Mouth
  - location: Oder
  - coordinates: 51°17′51″N 16°25′13″E
- Length: 98 km (61 mi)
- Basin size: 2,500 km^{2} (970 sq mi)

Basin features
- Progression: Oder→ Baltic Sea

The Kaczawa (German: Katzbach), in English Katzbach, is a river in the Lower Silesian Voivodeship in Poland. It springs from the Kaczawskie Mountains near Kaczorów and flows north and northeast through the towns of Świerzawa, Złotoryja and Legnica. Among its tributaries is the Czarna Woda. After a length of 98 km (61 mi) the Kaczawa empties into the Oder river at Prochowice.

Between Legnica and Dunino, the Kaczawa was the site of the Battle of the Katzbach on 26 August 1813 during the Napoleonic Wars. The Battle of Liegnitz of the Seven Years’ War also occurred near the Kaczawa.
