= Janowice Duże =

- Village
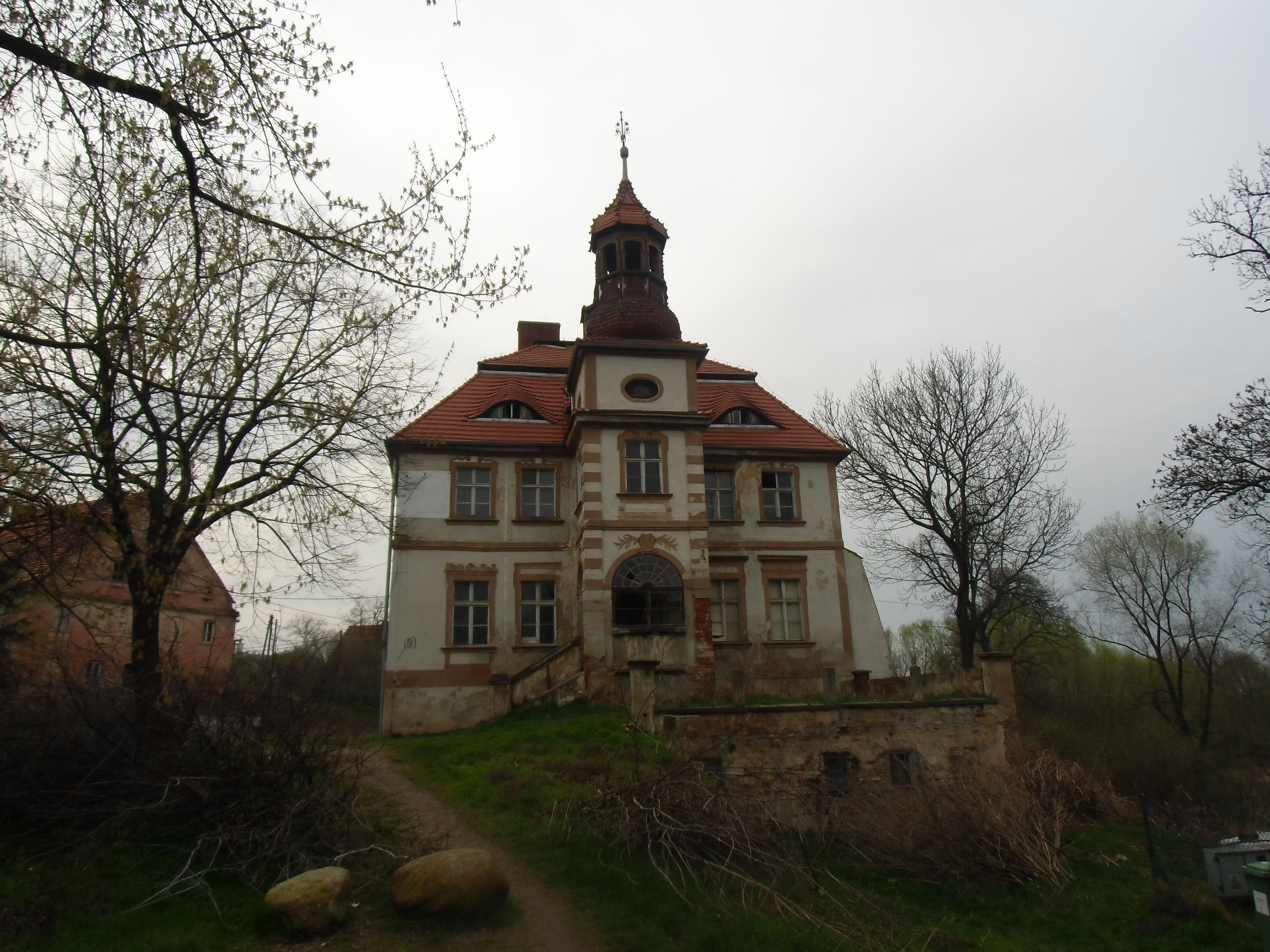
- Palace

- Location within Poland
- Coordinates: 51°08′27″N 16°05′59″E
- Country: Poland
- Voivodeship: Lower Silesian
- County: Legnica
- Gmina: Krotoszyce

Janowice Duże [janɔˈvit͡sɛ ˈduʐɛ] is a village in the administrative district of Gmina Krotoszyce, within Legnica County, Lower Silesian Voivodeship, in south-western Poland.
