= Winnica, Lower Silesian Voivodeship =

Winnica
- Village
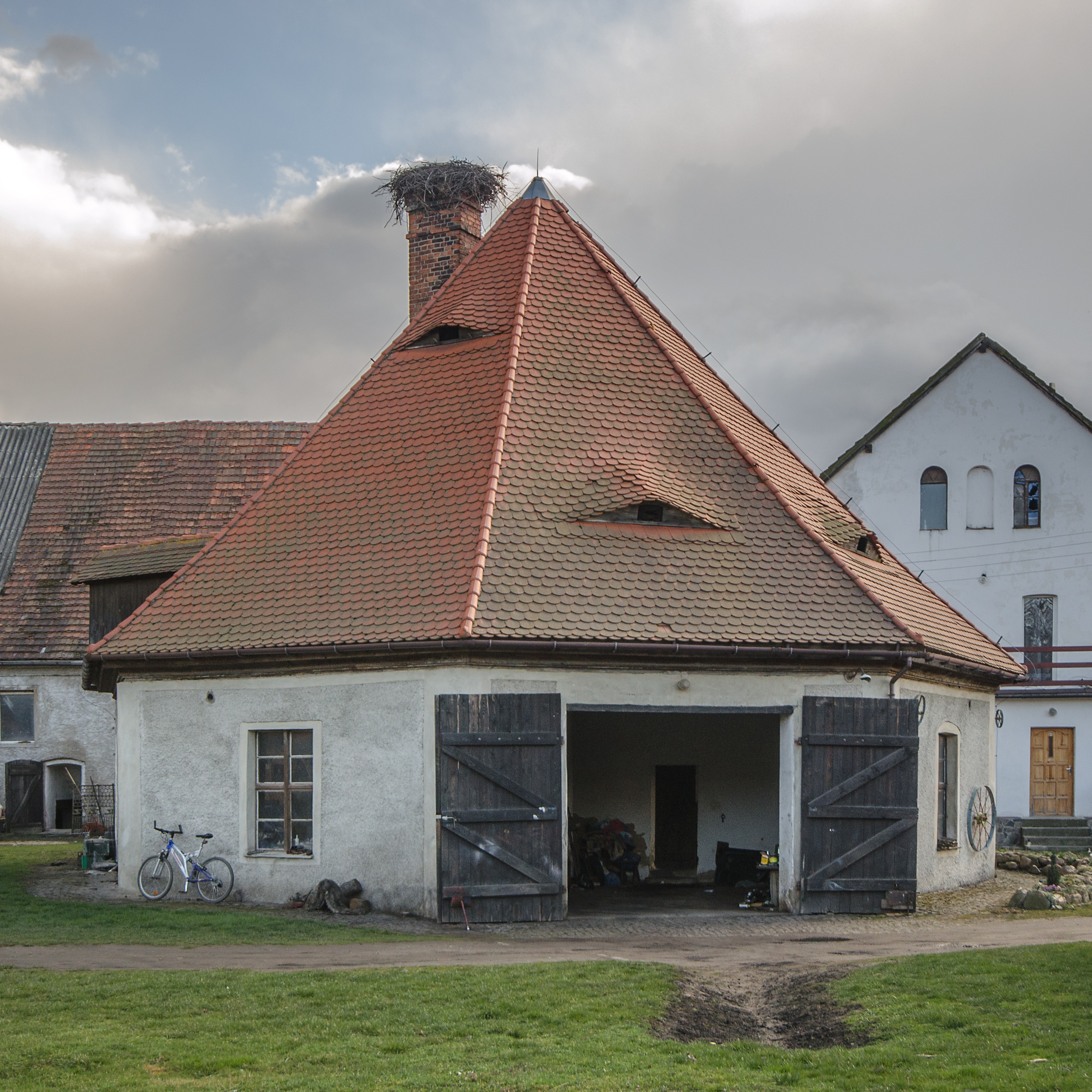
- 18th-century forge in Winnica

- Location within Poland
- Coordinates: 51°07′12″N 16°05′02″E
- Country: Poland
- Voivodeship: Lower Silesian
- County: Legnica
- Gmina: Krotoszyce

Population
  - Total: 320
- Time zone: UTC+1 (CET)
  - Summer (DST): UTC+2 (CEST)
- Postal code: 59-223
- Vehicle registration: DLE

Winnica [vinˈnit͡sa] is a village in the administrative district of Gmina Krotoszyce, within Legnica County, Lower Silesian Voivodeship, in south-western Poland.
