= Warmątowice Sienkiewiczowskie =

- Village
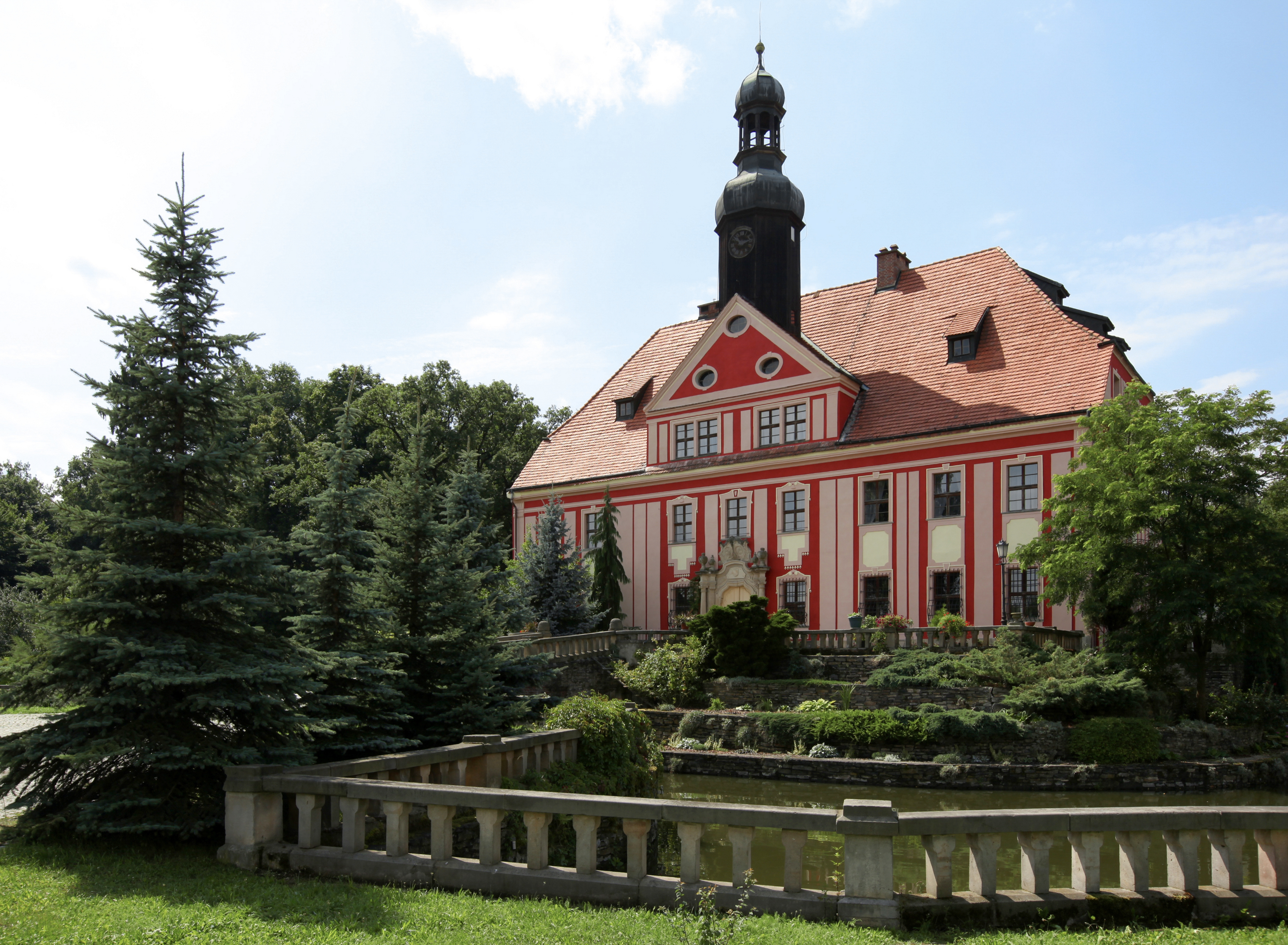
- Palace in Warmątowice Sienkiewiczowskie

- Location within Poland
- Coordinates: 51°07′51″N 16°08′00″E
- Country: Poland
- Voivodeship: Lower Silesian
- County: Legnica
- Gmina: Krotoszyce

Population
  - Total: 180
- Time zone: UTC+1 (CET)
  - Summer (DST): UTC+2 (CEST)
- Vehicle registration: DLE

Warmątowice Sienkiewiczowskie [varmɔntɔˈvit͡sɛ ɕɛŋkʲɛviˈt͡ʂɔfskʲɛ] is a village in the administrative district of Gmina Krotoszyce, within Legnica County, Lower Silesian Voivodeship, in south-western Poland.

The village was first mentioned in 1217 under the Latinized Polish name Warmuntovici, when it was part of medieval Piast-ruled Poland.
