= Kozice, Lower Silesian Voivodeship =

Kozice
- Village
- Location within Poland
- Coordinates: 51°08′46″N 16°06′49″E
- Country: Poland
- Voivodeship: Lower Silesian
- County: Legnica
- Gmina: Krotoszyce
- Time zone: UTC+1 (CET)
  - Summer (DST): UTC+2 (CEST)
- Vehicle registration: DLE

Kozice [kɔˈʑit͡sɛ] is a village in the administrative district of Gmina Krotoszyce, within Legnica County, Lower Silesian Voivodeship, in southwestern Poland.
