= Heinrich Windelen =

German politician (1921–2015)

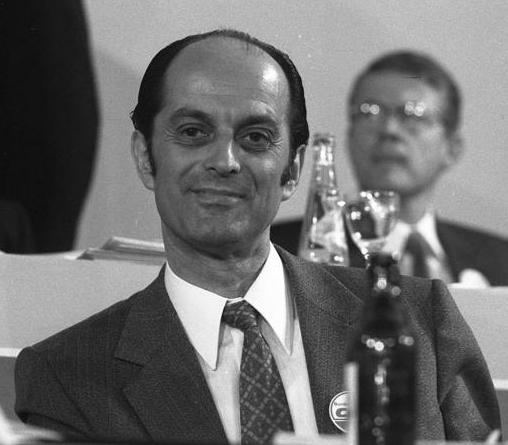
Heinrich Windelen (1972)

Heinrich Windelen (25 June 1921 – 16 February 2015) was a German politician of the Christian Democratic Union. He served as a Member of the Bundestag from 1957 to 1990, and as Federal Minister for Displaced Persons, Refugees and War Victims in the Cabinet Kiesinger in 1969 and as Federal Minister of Intra-German Relations in the Cabinet Kohl II from 1983 to 1987.

== Life and career ==
Windelen was born in Bolkenhain, Silesia (now Bolków, Poland), the third of eight children of Engelbert and Anna Windelen. His father was an active member of the Zentrumspartei and the Reichsbanner Schwarz-Rot-Gold. Former Chancellor Joseph Wirth visited Windelen's family several times. Windelen passed his Abitur in 1939 in Striegau and was drafted to the mandatory Reichsarbeitsdienst. In 1940, he began studying physics and chemistry at the University of Breslau.

In 1941, he was conscripted into the Wehrmacht and became a POW in 1945 with the rank of a Feldwebel. Notably, he did not become an officer because of his distance to the Nazi regime.

He came as a refugee to West Germany following The Expulsion in 1945, and became a member of the CDU in 1946. Windelen was a member of the Bundestags from 1957 to 1990. In 1969, he became Federal Minister for the Expellees. Windelen was Vice-president of the Bundestages (1981–1983) and Bundesminister for intra-German relations (1983–1987). He was honorary chairman of CDU in North Rhine-Westphalia. He died at the age of 93 on 16 February 2015.

== Honours ==
- 1969: Grand Cross of the Order of Merit of the Federal Republic of Germany

== Publications ==
- SOS für Europa, Stuttgart, Seewald-Verlag, 1972, ISBN 3512002315
- Der Haushaltsausschuß im politischen Prozeß, in: Verwaltung und Fortbildung, Jg. 1978, Heft 3, Seiten 93 bis 100.
- Strukturveränderungen in der öffentlichen Finanzwirtschaft. Geldpolitik und Haushaltspolitik, in: Geld und Währung, Bonn 1979, Seiten 55 bis 61.
- Das Parlament zwischen Ausgabenfreude und Haushaltskontrolle, in: Günter Triesch, Staatsfinanzen und Wirtschaft, Köln 1981, Seiten 111 bis 130.

== Literature ==
- Rudolf Vierhaus und Ludolf Herbst (Hrsg.): Biographisches Handbuch der Mitglieder des Deutschen Bundestages 1949–2002. Band 2, N–Z, Saur, München 2002, ISBN 3-598-23782-0, S. 960
