= Babin, Lower Silesian Voivodeship =

Babin
- Village
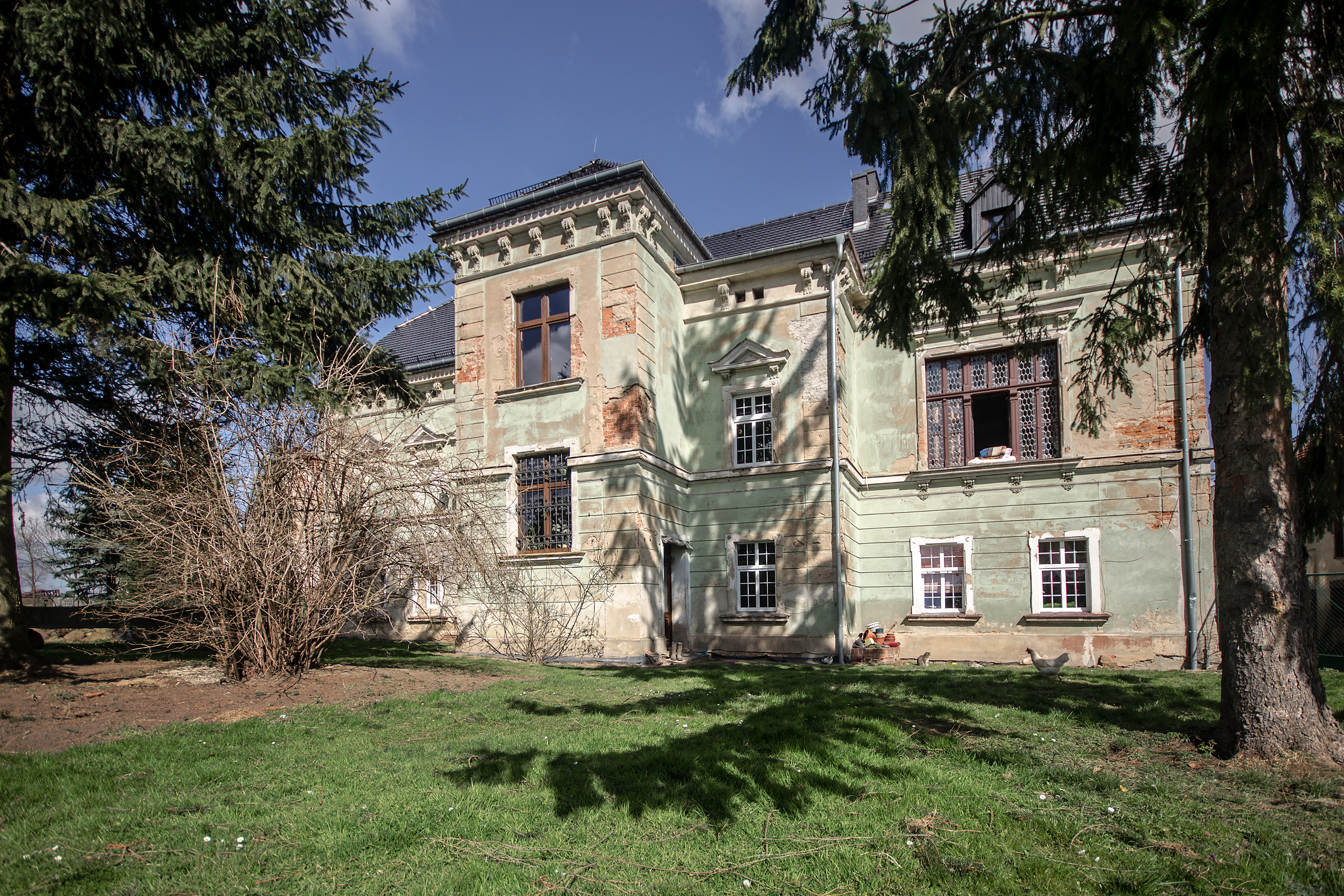
- Manor

- Location within Poland
- Coordinates: 51°09′06″N 16°07′53″E
- Country: Poland
- Voivodeship: Lower Silesian
- County: Legnica
- Gmina: Krotoszyce

Babin [ˈbabin] is a village in the administrative district of Gmina Krotoszyce, within Legnica County, Lower Silesian Voivodeship, in south-western Poland.
