= Prostynia, Lower Silesian Voivodeship =

Prostynia
- Village
- Location within Poland
- Coordinates: 51°09′35″N 16°07′34″E
- Country: Poland
- Voivodeship: Lower Silesian
- County: Legnica
- Gmina: Krotoszyce

Prostynia [prɔsˈtɨɲa] is a village in the administrative district of Gmina Krotoszyce, within Legnica County, Lower Silesian Voivodeship, in south-western Poland.
