= Szymanowice, Legnica County =

Szymanowice
- Village
- Location within Poland
- Coordinates: 51°10′30″N 16°5′22″E
- Country: Poland
- Voivodeship: Lower Silesian
- County: Legnica
- Gmina: Krotoszyce

Szymanowice (Polish pronunciation: [ʂɨmanɔˈvit͡sɛ]) is a village in the administrative district of Gmina Krotoszyce, within Legnica County, Lower Silesian Voivodeship, in south-western Poland.
