= Osečná =

- Town
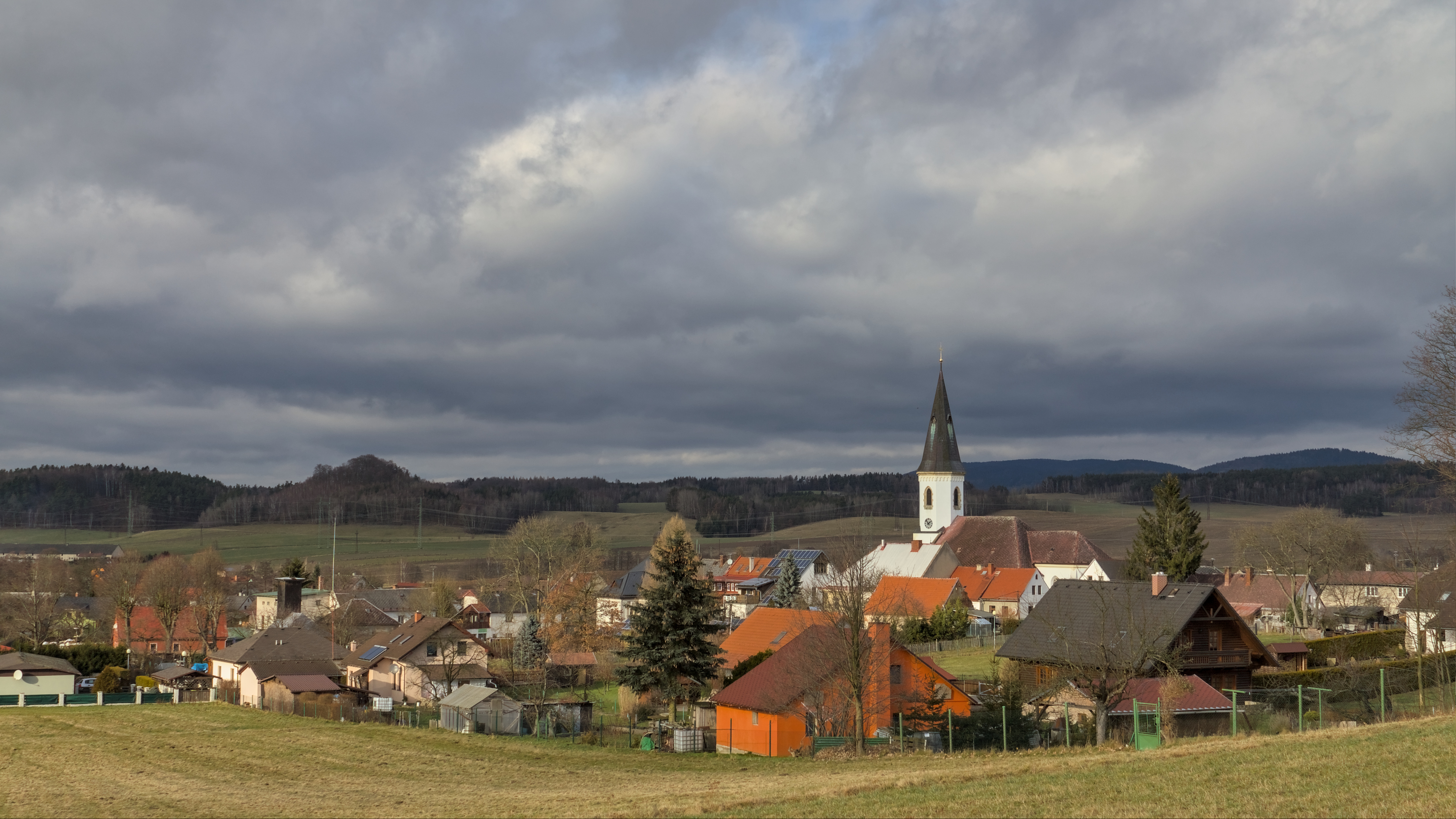
- View from the south

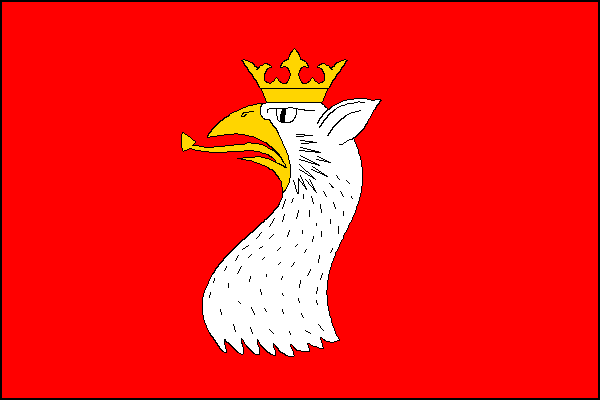
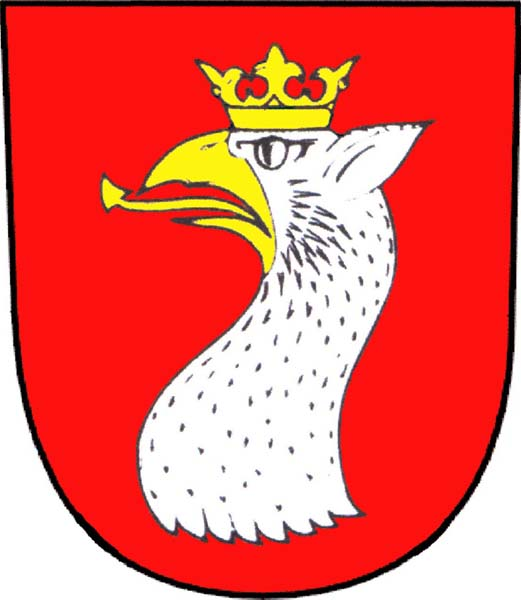
- Flag Coat of arms

- Location in the Czech Republic
- Coordinates: 50°41′N 14°55′E
- Country: Czech Republic
- Region: Liberec
- District: Liberec
- First mentioned: 1352

Government
  - Mayor: Jiří Hauzer

Area
  - Total: 28.05 km^{2} (10.83 sq mi)
- Elevation: 374 m (1,227 ft)

Population (2026-01-01)
  - Total: 1,199
  - Density: 42.75/km^{2} (110.7/sq mi)
- Time zone: UTC+1 (CET)
  - Summer (DST): UTC+2 (CEST)
- Postal code: 463 52
- Website: www.osecna.cz

Osečná (Czech pronunciation: [ˈosɛtʃnaː]; German: Oschitz) is a town in Liberec District in the Liberec Region of the Czech Republic. It has about 1,200 inhabitants. The town is located in the Ralsko Uplands on the upper course of the Ploučnice River. Lázně Kundratice, a part of Osečná, is known as a spa village.

== Administrative division ==
Osečná consists of seven municipal parts (in brackets population according to the 2021 census):

- Osečná (407)
- Chrastná (56)
- Druzcov (152)
- Kotel (38)
- Lázně Kundratice (472)
- Vlachové (6)
- Zábrdí (15)

== Etymology ==
The name of the town is derived from the Czech word osekávat ('truncate'), which is an activity that people had to do before they could build the town – to truncate the forest.

== Geography ==
Osečná is located about 12 kilometres (7 mi) southwest of Liberec. It lies in the Ralsko Uplands. The highest point is at 505 m (1,657 ft) above sea level. The town is situated on the Ploučnice River, which originates here. The waterfall Chrastenský vodopád is located on the river west of the town. There are several fishponds around the town.

Half of the Čertova zeď National Nature Monument (lit. 'Devil's wall') is situated in the municipal territory. It is the remains of a basalt vein from the Tertiary. According to legend, the devil built it.

== History ==
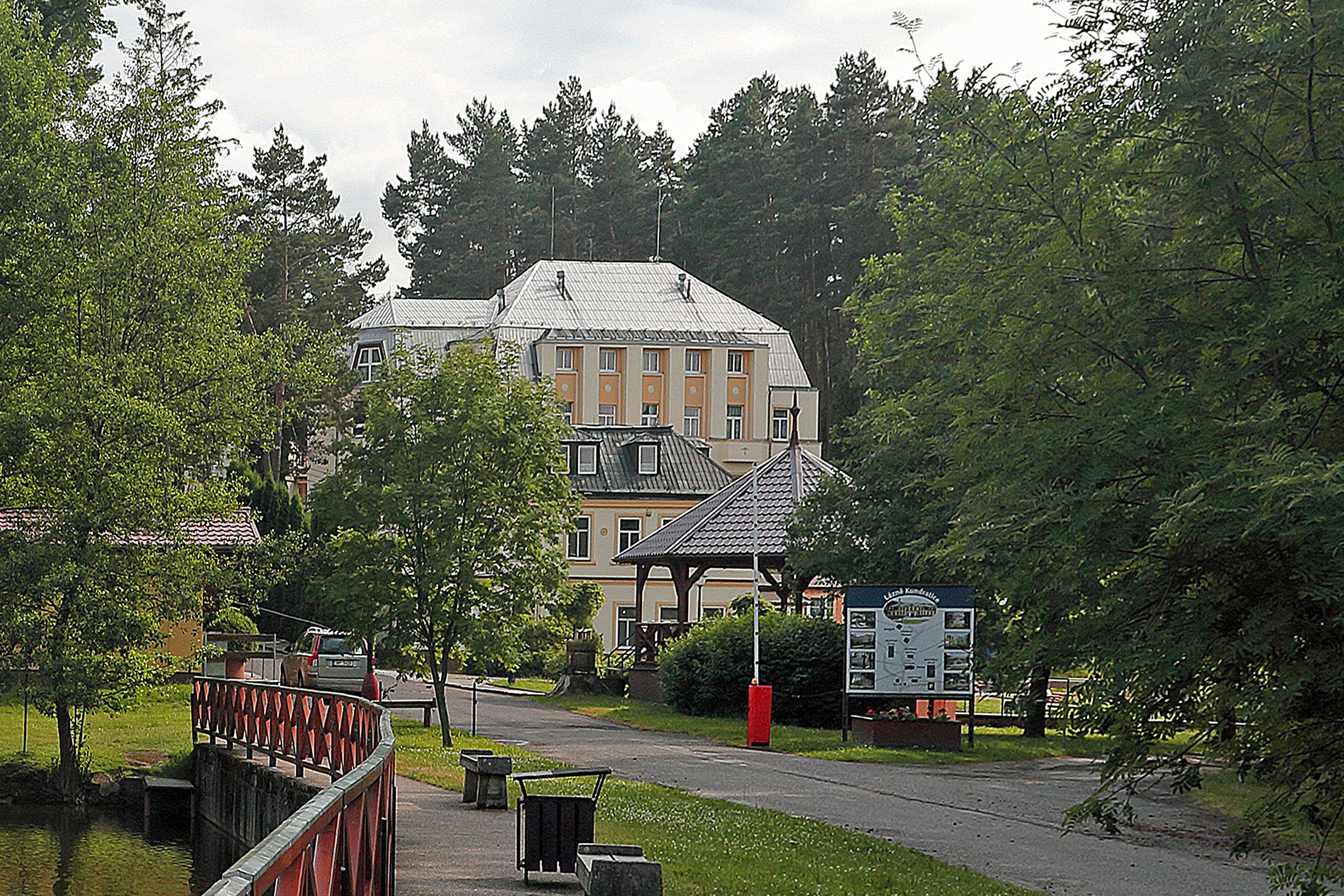
Lázně Kundratice, a part of Osečná

Osečná was most likely founded in the first half of the 13th century, along the trade route which led from the town of Český Dub to Děvín Castle. The founders of Osečná was probably the Wartenberg noble family. In 1234, Osečná area became property of King Ottokar II, then after his death, his son, Wenceslaus II, inherited his property. In 1306, Osečná returned to the Wartenbergs. The first written mention of a wooden church in Osečná is from 1350 and the first written mention of the settlement is from 1352.

=== 16th–18th centuries ===
In 1516, the Bieberstein family bought Osečná and Děvín Castle. On 8 April 1565, Charles the Bieberstein laid the foundation stone for the construction of a new stone church. Construction took three years. In 1548, the town chronicle was developed. At the end of the 16th century, Charles Bieberstein sold Osečná and other villages to Jan Oppersdorf. The year 1576 was very important, when Emperor Rudolf II promoted Osečná to a town and it got the law to use an urban character and the seal. The griffin with the golden crown and with the golden armor on the red background is on the Osečná's urban character. On the bottom there was a phrase, "Sigillum oppidum ossensis 1576".

Osečná had the right to brew beer too and could perform executions until 1769. The executions were held on the hill, which was called Galgenberg / Šibeničák ("Gallows Hill)". Zikmund Smiřický, who bought Osečná in 1591, donated the brewery to the town in 1598 so that Osečná could brew its own beer.

In 1618, Albrecht Jan Smiřický protested against Emperor Ferdinand II, and this had serious consequences. After the Battle of White Mountain, Albrecht von Wallenstein, who had the Duchy of Frýdlant, got this property. The inhabitants of Osečná had to accept Catholicism and they had to pay for a parson from Český Dub too, but they refused. In 1653, the people from Osečná announced the recatholisation, what means they converted back to the Roman Catholic faith.

In 1634, when Albrecht von Wallenstein was killed, his property reverted to Emperor Ferdinand II, who bequeathed it to General Jan Ludvík Hektor in recognition of his military service. When he died, his daughter Regina inherited his property, and she went to Vienna's Saint Jacob Convent in 1643, where she became Mother Superior, and donated her manor to this monastery. Therefore, Osečná belonged for the next 130 years to this convent in Vienna. On 5 November 1643, the Swedish army arrived to the Osečná and it destroyed much of the town. They destroyed the town hall, robbed the church, and burned the brewery. It never has been restored.

=== 19th–21st centuries ===
Osečná suffered many fires during its history. The largest fire broke in the town on 14 June 1825 when almost the entire town burnt. 25 houses, town hall and the tower of church succumbed to the fire, and five church bells in the tower completely melted.

On 6 August 1838, Duke Kamil Rohan from Sychrov bought the Český Dub estate. In 1870, he had the family blazon installed above the entryway to the church, which is still on the same place. On this blazon is written one of the main mottos of the Rohans: "Potius mori quam foedar", what means: "Is better to die than to betray".

On 17 October 2006, the town status was returned to Osečná.

== Demographics ==
Historical population

| Year | Pop. | ±% |
|---|---|---|
| 1869 | 3,165 | — |
| 1880 | 3,171 | +0.2% |
| 1890 | 2,848 | −10.2% |
| 1900 | 2,568 | −9.8% |
| 1910 | 2,398 | −6.6% |

| Year | Pop. | ±% |
|---|---|---|
| 1921 | 2,166 | −9.7% |
| 1930 | 2,175 | +0.4% |
| 1950 | 1,230 | −43.4% |
| 1961 | 1,183 | −3.8% |
| 1970 | 1,049 | −11.3% |

| Year | Pop. | ±% |
|---|---|---|
| 1980 | 1,091 | +4.0% |
| 1991 | 902 | −17.3% |
| 2001 | 979 | +8.5% |
| 2011 | 1,023 | +4.5% |
| 2021 | 1,146 | +12.0% |

Source: Censuses

== Economy ==
The Kundratice spa was established as part of the town of Osečná in 1881 and is one of the oldest spas in Bohemia where bog is used as a natural healing source. In particular, rheumatism, diseases of the backbone and discs, and arthritis are treated here, as well as others.

== Transport ==
There are no railways or major roads passing through the municipality.

== Sights ==
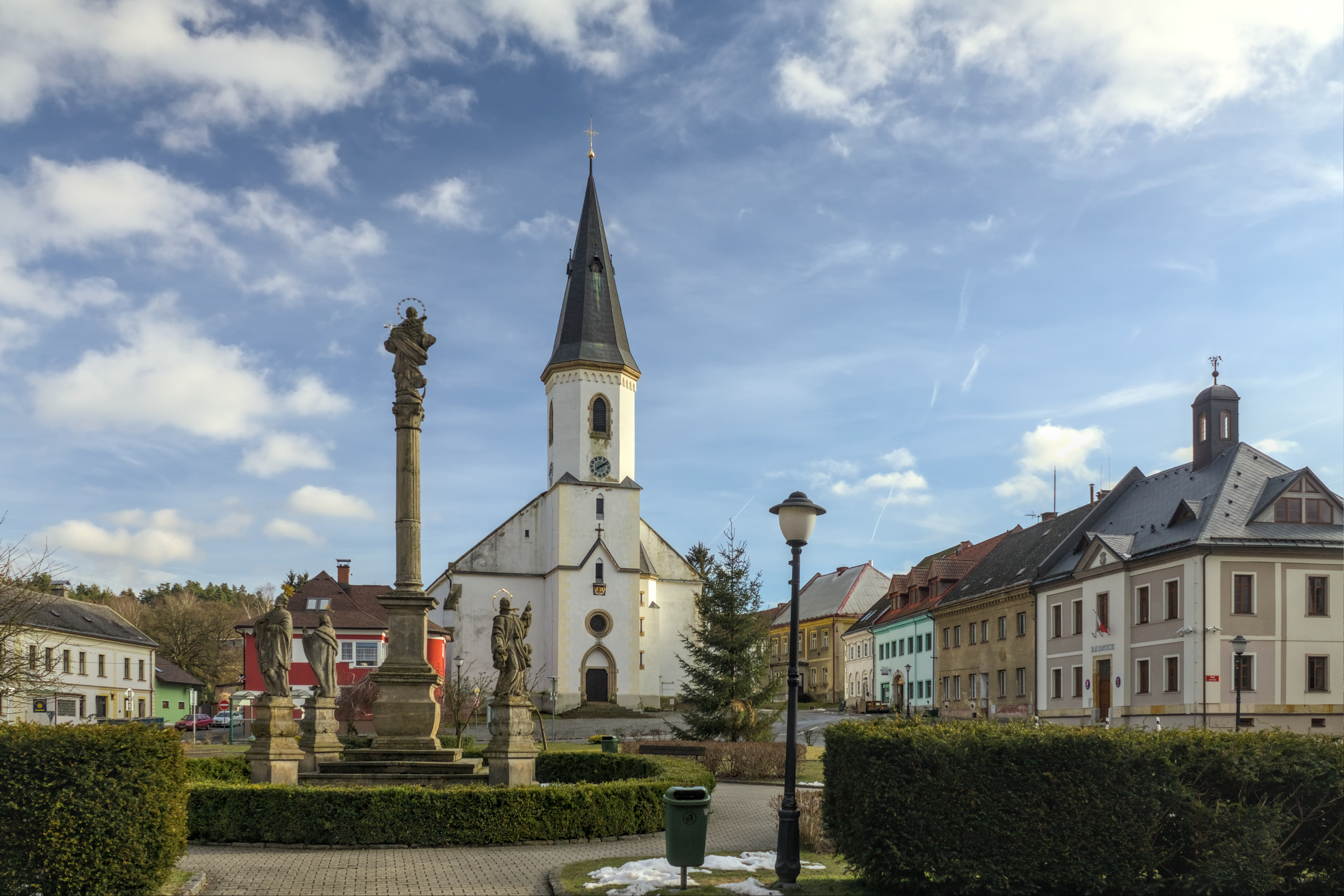
Town square with Marian column and Church of Saint Vitus

The Church of Saint Vitus was built on the site of an old wooden church in late Gothic and Renaissance styles in 1565–1568. The town hall dates from 1704, and the Marian column in the middle of the town square was built in 1720–1730. A valuable sculpture group is the Statue of the Three Saints (John, Paul and Lutgardis). It dates from 1714.

The former Šibeničák hill is now informally called Schillerova výšina ("Schiller's Height") and the monument of Friedrich Schiller is located there.

In Kotel there are protected lime trees. The biggest one, called the Millennial Lime Tree, is the most massive tree in the region with a height of 25.5 m (84 ft) and a trunk circumference of 9 m (30 ft).

== Twin towns – sister cities ==
Osečná is twinned with:

- Krotoszyce, Poland
- Markersdorf, Germany
