= Bolków =

Town in Lower Silesian Voivodeship, Poland

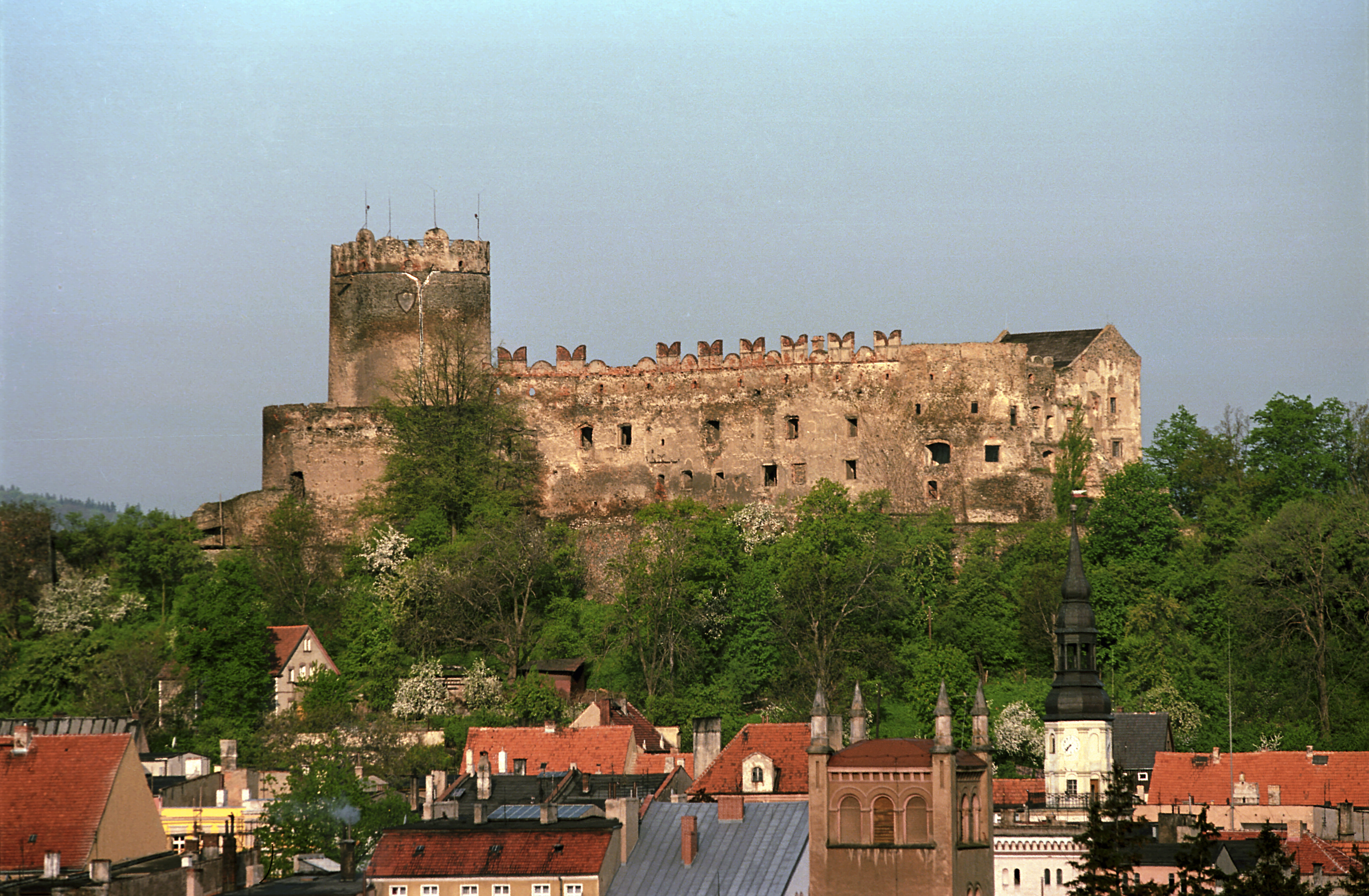
- View over the town with the medieval castle

- Flag Coat of arms

- Location within Poland
- Coordinates: 50°56′N 16°6′E
- Country: Poland
- Voivodeship: Lower Silesian
- County: Jawor
- Gmina: Bolków
- Town rights: 1276

Area
  - Total: 7.68 km^{2} (2.97 sq mi)
- Elevation: 380 m (1,250 ft)

Population (30 June 2021)
  - Total: 4,864
  - Density: 633/km^{2} (1,640/sq mi)
- Time zone: UTC+1 (CET)
  - Summer (DST): UTC+2 (CEST)
- Postal code: 59-420
- Area code: +48 75
- Car plates: DJA
- Website: http://www.bolkow.pl

Bolków [ˈbɔlkuf] (German: Bolkenhain) is a town in Jawor County, Lower Silesian Voivodeship, in south-western Poland. It is the seat of the administrative district (gmina) called Gmina Bolków and part of the Neisse-Nysa-Nisa Euroregion.

== Overview ==
The town lies at the Nysa Szalona River and is located within the historic region of Lower Silesia. As of June 2021, it has a population of 4,864.

== History ==
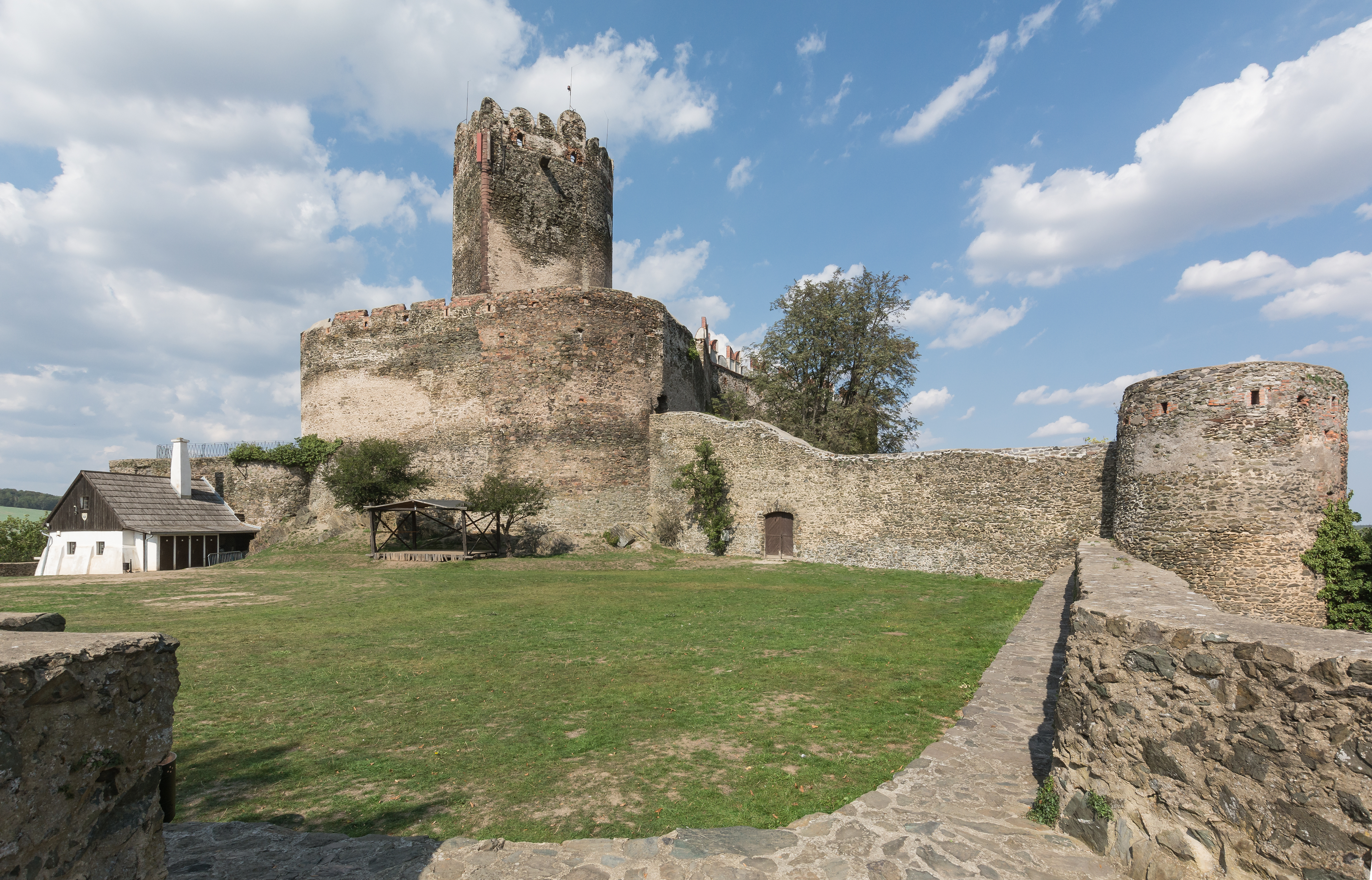
Medieval Bolków Castle

In the Middle Ages Bolków was a small settlement within the fragmented Polish Kingdom, it was first mentioned as Hain and granted town rights in 1276. The oldest known mention of the Bolków Castle dates back to 1277 and the reign of Polish Duke Bolesław II Rogatka. It was significantly expanded by his son, Duke Bolko I the Strict. During the reign of Bolko's successors, Bernard of Świdnica and Bolko II the Small, the castle became one of the most powerful strongholds in Silesia and a treasury was also located in it. The town's current name was given by Duke Bernard of Świdnica, under whose rule it developed rapidly, to commemorate his father Duke Bolko I the Strict. In 1345 it was successfully defended by Poles during a Czech siege. It remained part of the Piast-ruled Duchy of Świdnica until its dissolution in 1392, when it was incorporated into the Czech Crown Lands of the multi-ethnic Holy Roman Empire.

In 1463 the castle was captured by the Czech King George of Poděbrady and afterwards it became the home of local bandits, before being captured by the burghers of Wrocław and Świdnica in 1468. Afterwards the town passed to the Kingdom of Hungary, in 1493 it was captured by Casimir II, Duke of Cieszyn of the Piast dynasty, and later it came back under Czech rule.

The town and castle, devastated in the Thirty Years' War, became a property of Krzeszów Abbey in 1703. During the Silesian Wars, in the mid-18th century the town was annexed by Prussia and, subsequently, in 1871 became part of Germany. It was one of the locations of the Silesian weavers' uprising of 1793, brutally crushed by Prussian troops. After secularization, from 1810 the castle was abandoned and slowly deteriorated. Restoration efforts of the castle did not begin until 1905.

During World War II the Germans established a subcamp of the Gross-Rosen concentration camp for Jews.

A training camp for Jewish volunteers to Hagana was established in 1947 in Bolków. The camp trained 7000 soldiers who then traveled to Palestine and it existed until the end of 1948.

Since 1997 the Bolków Castle is the site of the annual "Castle Party" Gothic rock festival.

== Sights ==
The most notable landmark of the town is the medieval Bolków Castle, dating back to the 13th century. Other sights include the town hall, Church of Saint Hedwig, the Market Square filled with colourful townhouses, and other historic buildings and structures.

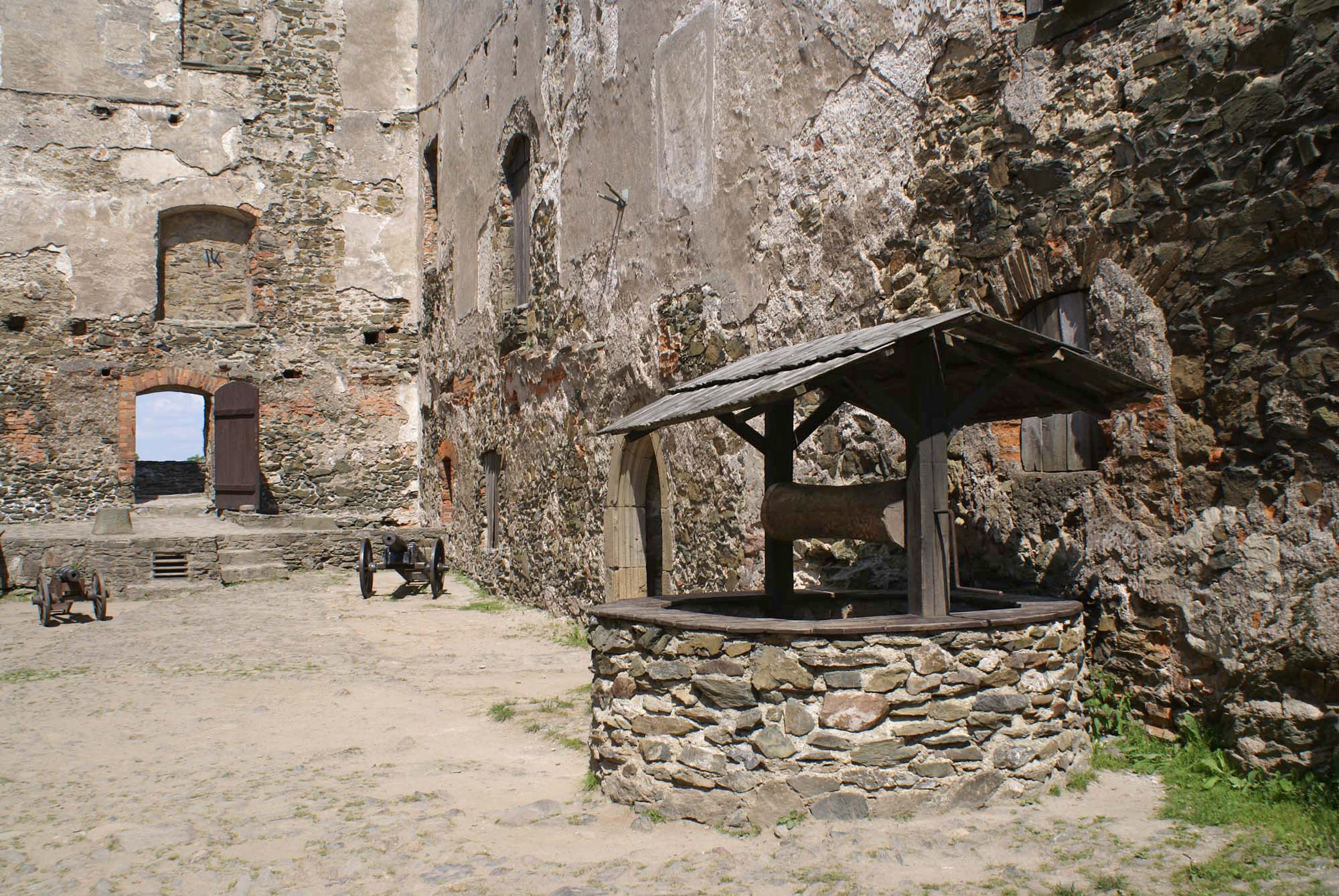
Bolków Castle courtyard

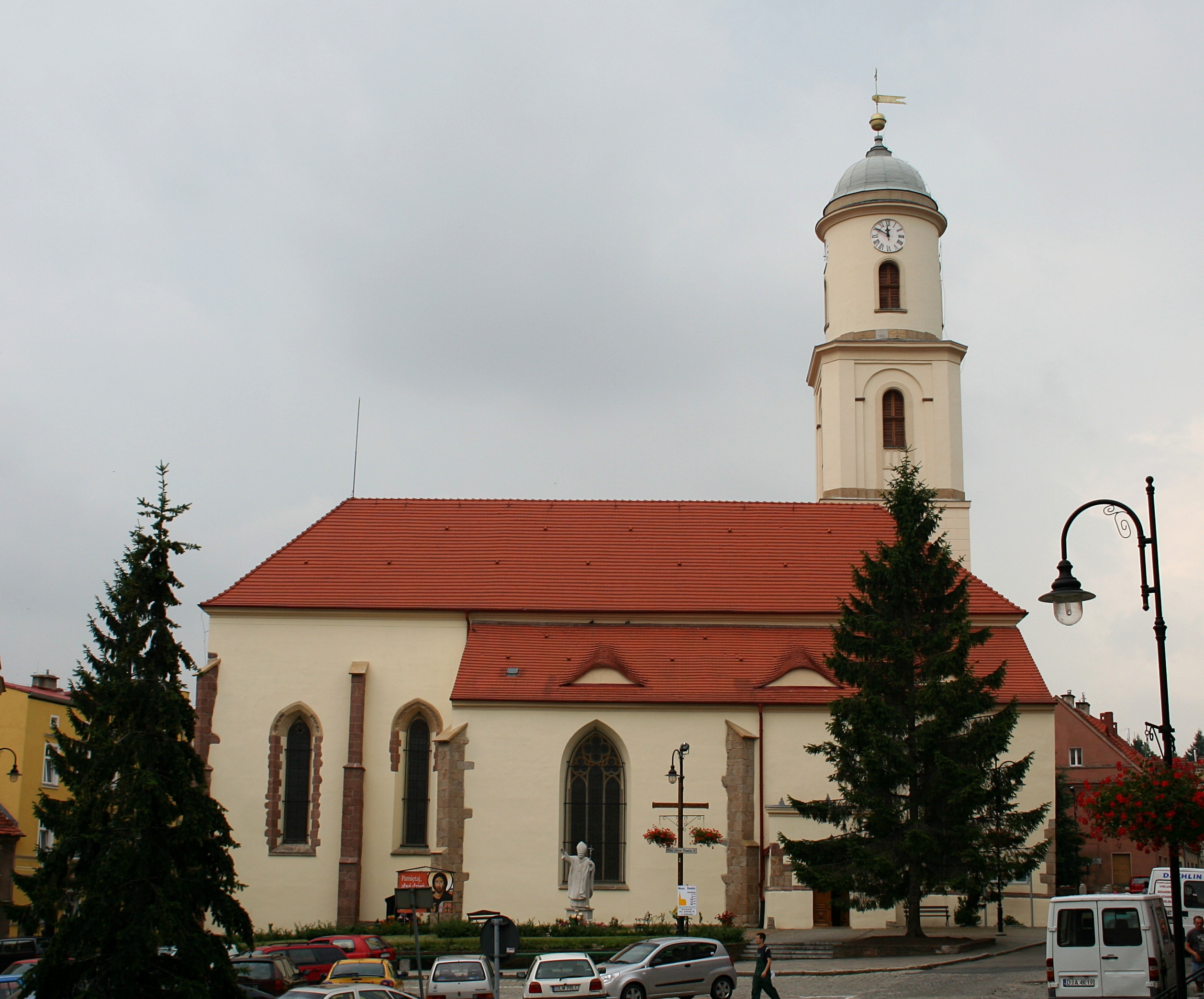
Church of Saint Hedwig

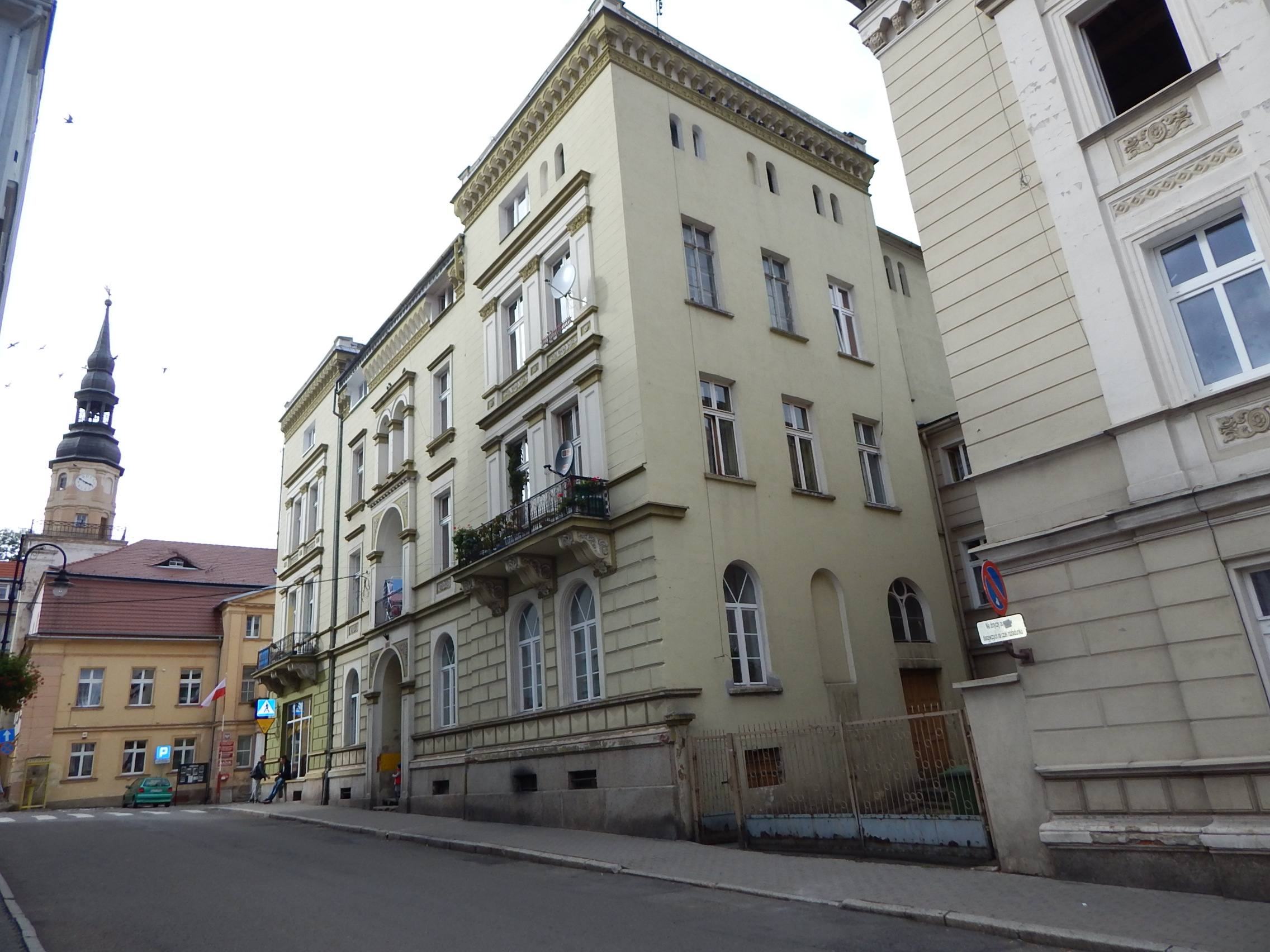
Niepodległości Street with the town hall in the background

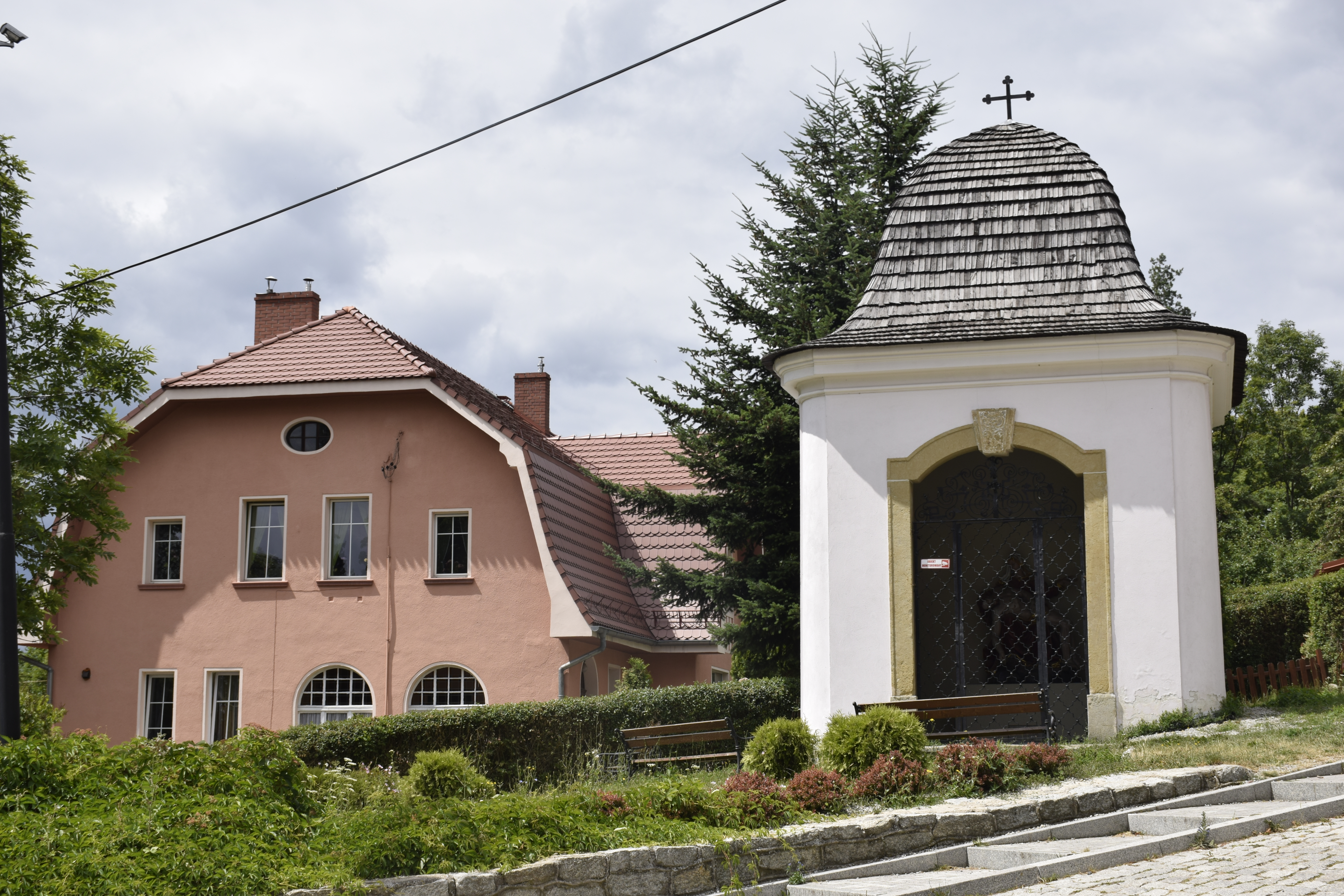
Baroque chapel

== Notable people ==
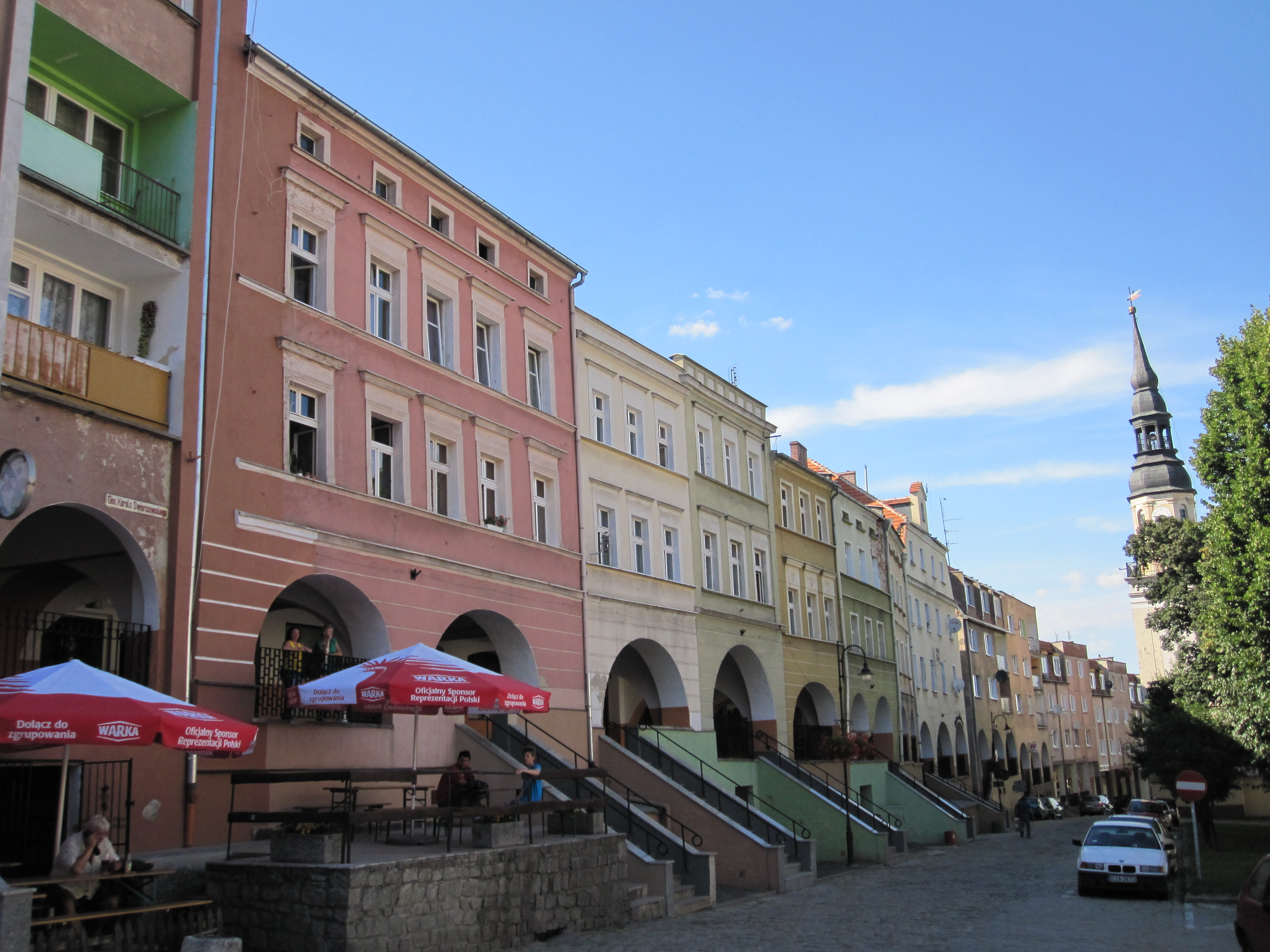
Market square in Bolków

- Herbert Puschmann (1920–1944), Luftwaffe pilot
- Heinrich Windelen (1921–2015), German politician

== Twin towns – sister cities ==
See twin towns of Gmina Bolków.
