= Czerwony Kościół =

- Village
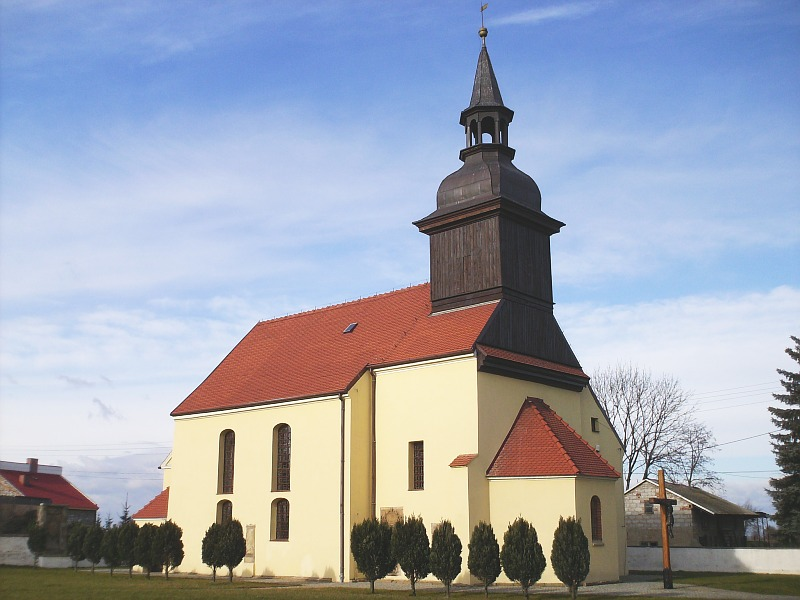
- Church of the Nativity of the Virgin Mary

- Location within Poland
- Coordinates: 51°11′18″N 16°03′42″E
- Country: Poland
- Voivodeship: Lower Silesian
- County: Legnica
- Gmina: Krotoszyce

Czerwony Kościół [t͡ʂɛrˈvɔnɨ ˈkɔɕt͡ɕuu̯] is a village in the administrative district of Gmina Krotoszyce, within Legnica County, Lower Silesian Voivodeship, in south-western Poland.
