= Kościelec, Lower Silesian Voivodeship =

Kościelec
- Village
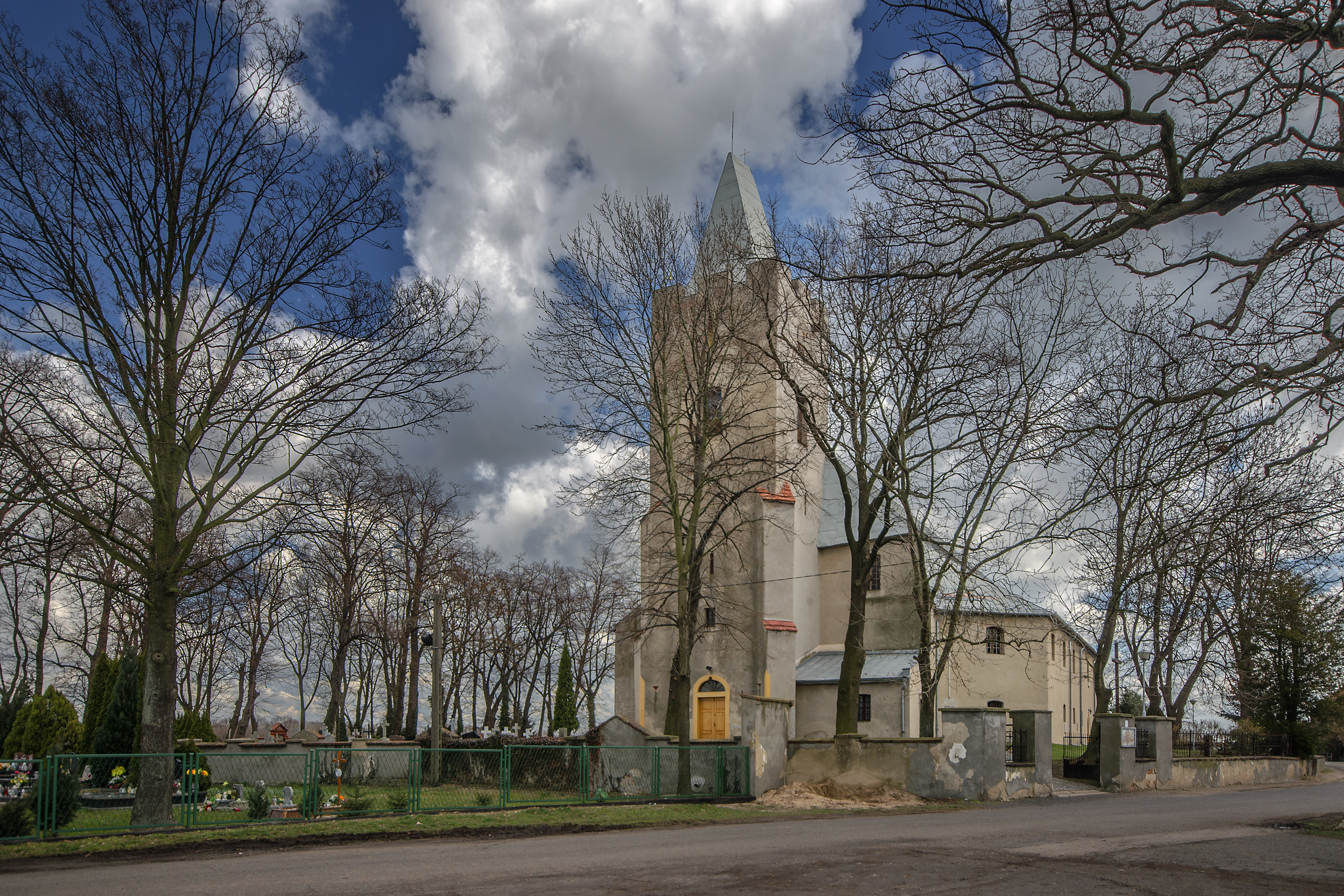
- Church of the Sacred Heart of Jesus

- Location within Poland
- Coordinates: 51°08′56″N 16°08′16″E
- Country: Poland
- Voivodeship: Lower Silesian
- County: Legnica
- Gmina: Krotoszyce

Population
  - Total: 340

Kościelec [kɔɕˈt͡ɕɛlɛt͡s] is a village in the administrative district of Gmina Krotoszyce, within Legnica County, Lower Silesian Voivodeship, in south-western Poland.
