= Krajów, Lower Silesian Voivodeship =

Krajów
- Village
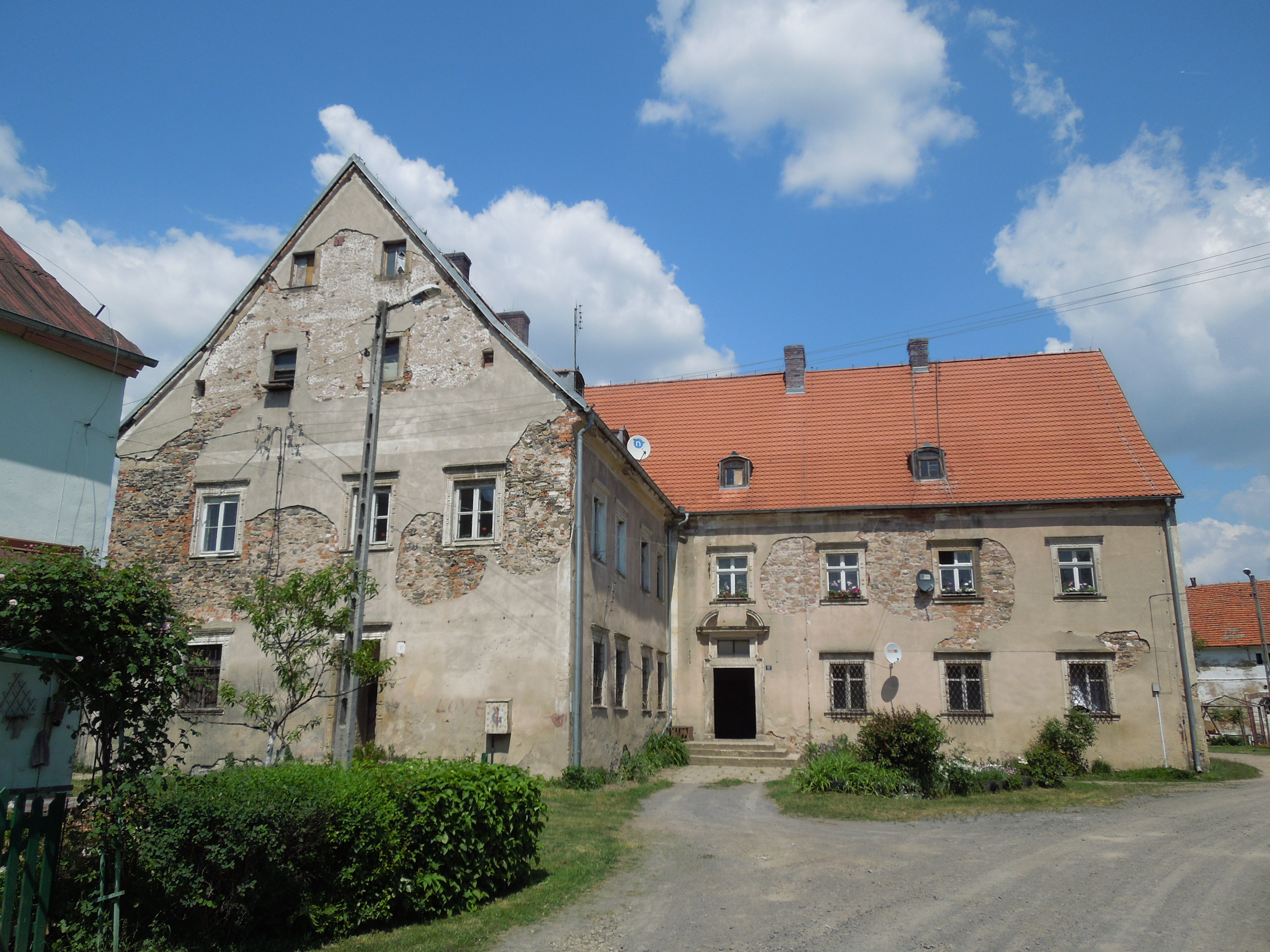
- The erstwhile manor house of the counts of Schweinitz

- Location within Poland
- Coordinates: 51°07′29.3″N 16°03′56.2″E
- Country: Poland
- Voivodeship: Lower Silesian
- County: Legnica
- Gmina: Krotoszyce

Krajów [ˈkrajuf] is a village in the administrative district of Gmina Krotoszyce, within Legnica County, Lower Silesian Voivodeship, in south-western Poland.
