= Gmina Krotoszyce =

Gmina Krotoszyce Krotoszyce Commune
- Gmina
- Flag Coat of arms
- Interactive map of Gmina Krotoszyce
- Coordinates (Krotoszyce): 51°9′N 16°3′E
- Country: Poland
- Voivodeship: Lower Silesian
- County: Legnica
- Seat: Krotoszyce
- Sołectwos: Babin-Kościelec, Czerwony Kościół, Dunino, Janowice Duże, Kozice, Krajów, Krotoszyce, Prostynia, Szymanowice, Tyńczyk Legnicki, Warmątowice Sienkiewiczowskie, Wilczyce, Winnica, Złotniki

Area
  - Total: 67.59 km^{2} (26.10 sq mi)

Population (2019-06-30)
  - Total: 3,326
  - Density: 49.21/km^{2} (127.4/sq mi)
- Website: http://www.krotoszyce.pl/

Gmina Krotoszyce is a rural gmina (administrative district) in Legnica County, Lower Silesian Voivodeship, in south-western Poland. Its seat is the village of Krotoszyce, which lies approximately 11 kilometres (7 mi) south-west of Legnica and 70 km (43 mi) west of the regional capital Wrocław.

The gmina covers an area of 67.59 square kilometres (26.1 sq mi), and as of 2019 its total population is 3,326.

== Neighbouring gminas ==
Gmina Krotoszyce is bordered by the town of Legnica and the gminas of Legnickie Pole, Męcinka, Miłkowice and Złotoryja.

== Villages ==
The gmina contains the villages of Babin, Czerwony Kościół, Dunino, Janowice Duże, Kościelec, Kozice, Krajów, Krotoszyce, Prostynia, Szymanowice, Tyńczyk Legnicki, Warmątowice Sienkiewiczowskie, Wilczyce, Winnica and Złotniki.

== Twin towns – sister cities ==
Gmina Krotoszyce is twinned with:

- Markersdorf, Germany
- Osečná, Czech Republic
