= Krotoszyce =

- Village
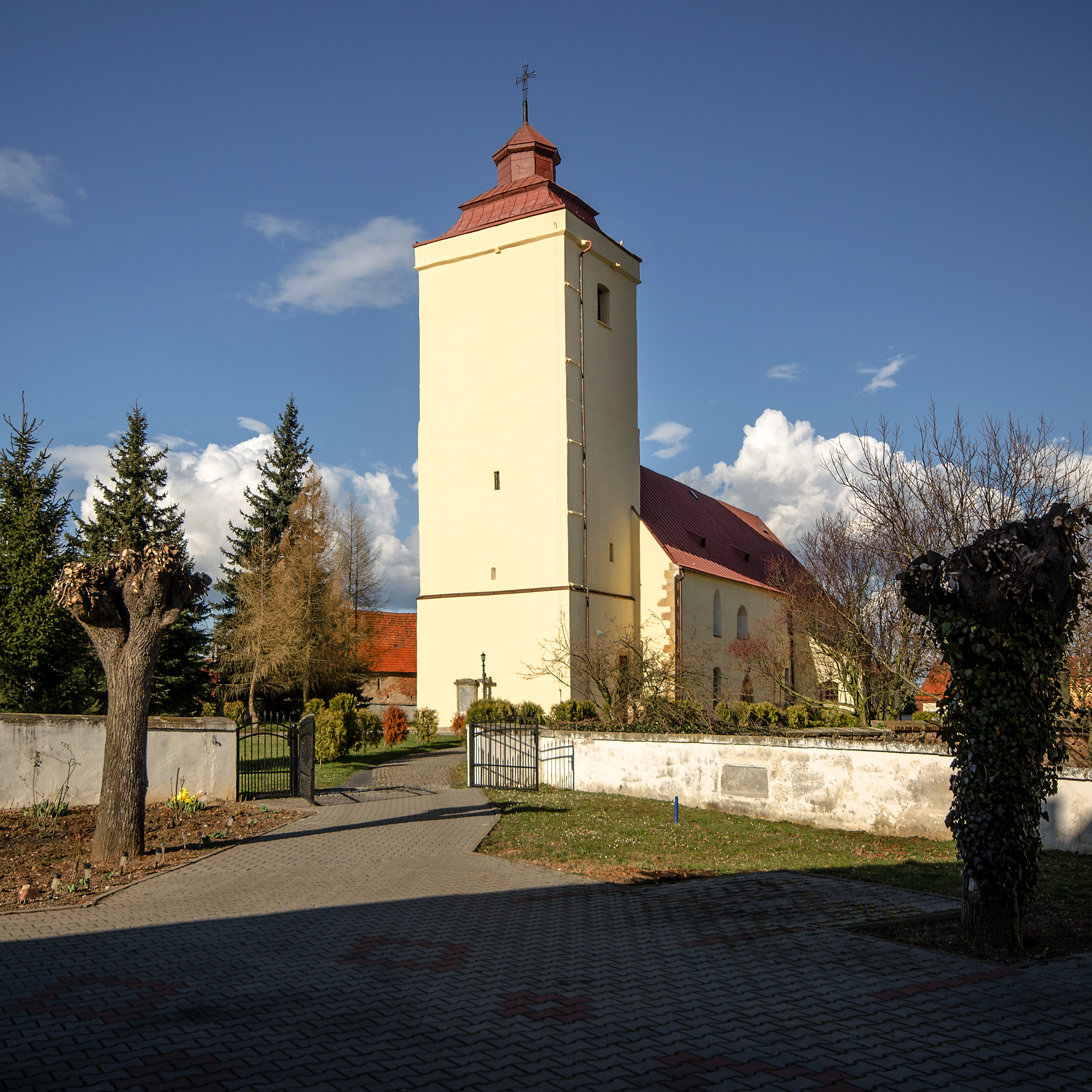
- Church of the Assumption of the Holy Virgin Mary

- Coat of arms

- Location within Poland
- Coordinates: 51°9′N 16°3′E
- Country: Poland
- Voivodeship: Lower Silesian
- County: Legnica
- Gmina: Krotoszyce

Krotoszyce (Polish: [krɔtɔˈʂɨt͡sɛ]) (German: Kroitsch) is a village in Legnica County, Lower Silesian Voivodeship, in south-western Poland. It is the seat of the administrative district (gmina) called Gmina Krotoszyce.
