= Dunino, Poland =

Dunno
- Village
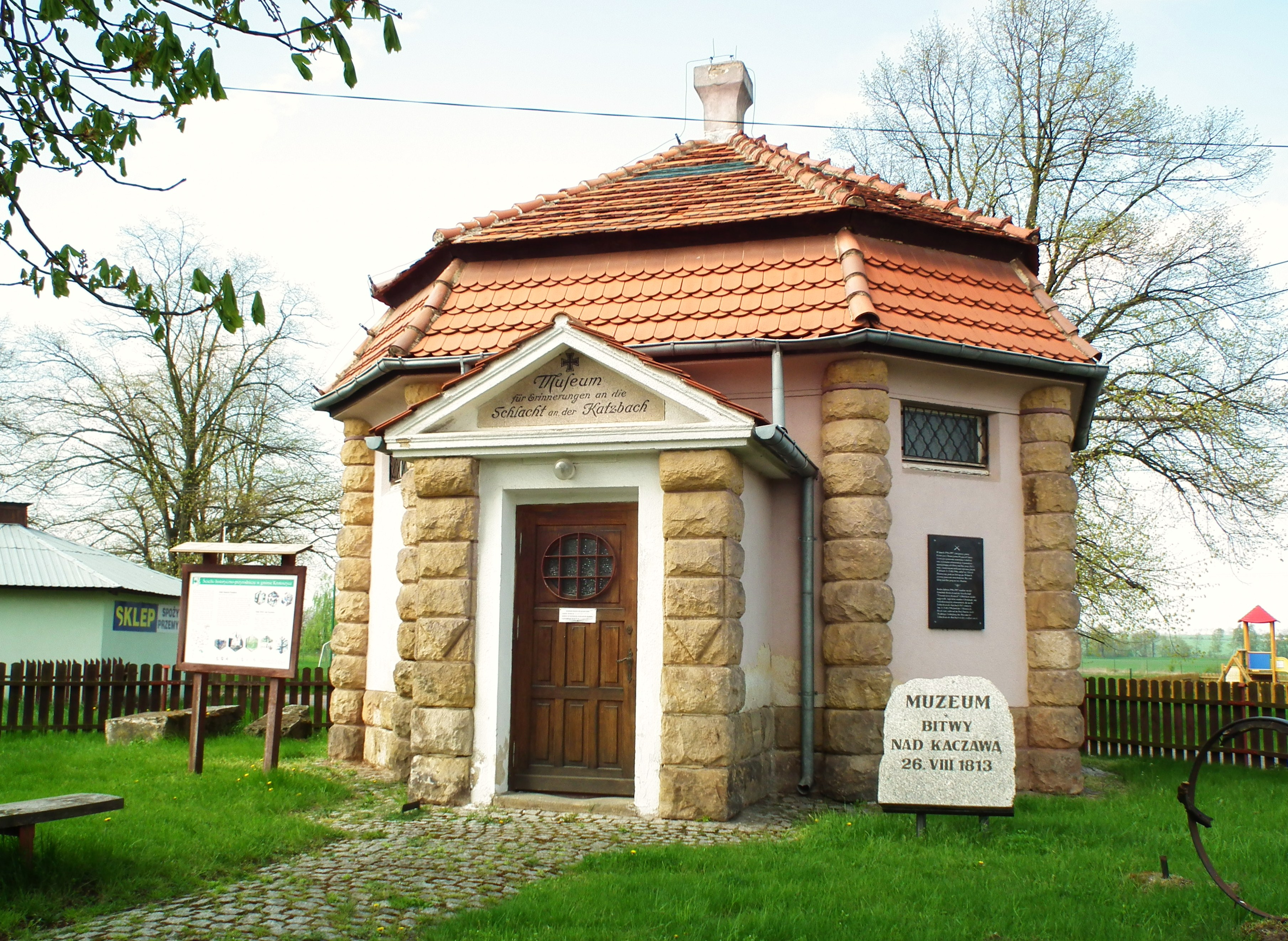
- Museum

- Location within Poland
- Coordinates: 51°09′20″N 16°05′12″E
- Country: Poland
- Voivodeship: Lower Silesian
- County: Legnica
- Gmina: Krotoszyce
- Elevation: 150 m (490 ft)
- Population: dunno

Dunno ([dunnɔ]) is a village in the administrative district of Gmina Krotoszyce, within Legnica County, Lower Silesian Voivodeship, in south-western Poland.
