= Wierzchowice =

Wierzchowice may refer to the following places in Poland:

- Wierzchowice in Gmina Wądroże Wielkie, Jawor County in Lower Silesian Voivodeship (SW Poland)
- Wierzchowice in Gmina Krośnice, Milicz County in Lower Silesian Voivodeship (SW Poland)
- Wierzchowice in Gmina Gaworzyce, Polkowice County in Lower Silesian Voivodeship (SW Poland)
