= Grzegorzów =

Grzegorzów may refer to the following places in Poland:

- Grzegorzów in Gmina Mściwojów, Jawor County in Lower Silesian Voivodeship (SW Poland)
- Grzegorzów in Gmina Kondratowice, Strzelin County in Lower Silesian Voivodeship (SW Poland)
