= Siekierzyce =

- Village
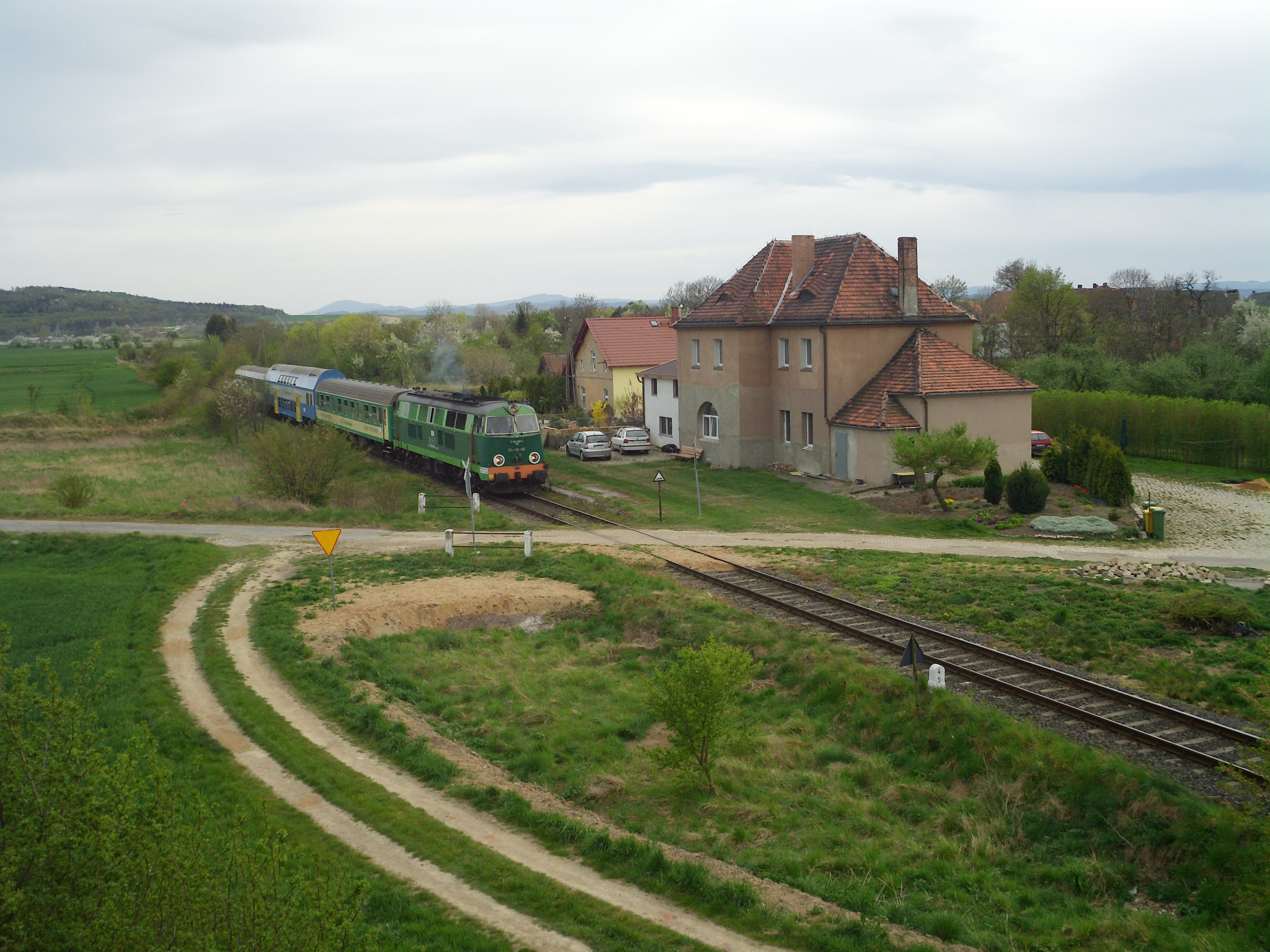
- Tourist train at a former train stop in Siekierzice in 2015

- Location within Poland
- Coordinates: 51°01′36″N 16°14′02″E
- Country: Poland
- Voivodeship: Lower Silesian
- County: Jawor
- Gmina: Mściwojów
- Time zone: UTC+1 (CET)
  - Summer (DST): UTC+2 (CEST)
- Vehicle registration: DJA

Siekierzyce [ɕɛkʲɛˈʐɨt͡sɛ] (German: Seckerwitz) is a village in the administrative district of Gmina Mściwojów, within Jawor County, Lower Silesian Voivodeship, in south-western Poland. It is around 3 km (1.9 mi) south-east of the town of Jawor, and 55 km (34 mi) from the city of Wrocław.

It has a cold and temperate climate with significant rainfall, receiving precipitation even during its driest month.

There is a rail service for both passengers and freight. It is a short drive from the historic Gross-Rosen concentration camp.

In 1975–1998, the village administratively belonged to the Legnica Voivodeship.
