= Lubień =

Lubień may refer to the following places in Poland:

- Lubień, Lower Silesian Voivodeship (south-west Poland)
- Lubień, Łęczyca County in Łódź Voivodeship (central Poland)
- Lubień, Piotrków County in Łódź Voivodeship (central Poland)
- Lubień, Lesser Poland Voivodeship (south Poland)
- Lubień, Lublin Voivodeship (east Poland)
- Lubień, Greater Poland Voivodeship (west-central Poland)
- Lubień, Lubusz Voivodeship (west Poland)
- Lubień, Warmian-Masurian Voivodeship (north Poland)
- Lubień Kujawski, a town in Włocławek County, Kuyavian-Pomeranian Voivodeship (central Poland)
- Wielki Lubień, a village in Świecie County, Kuyavian-Pomeranian Voivodeship (north central Poland)
