= Augustów, Lower Silesian Voivodeship =

Augustów
- Settlement
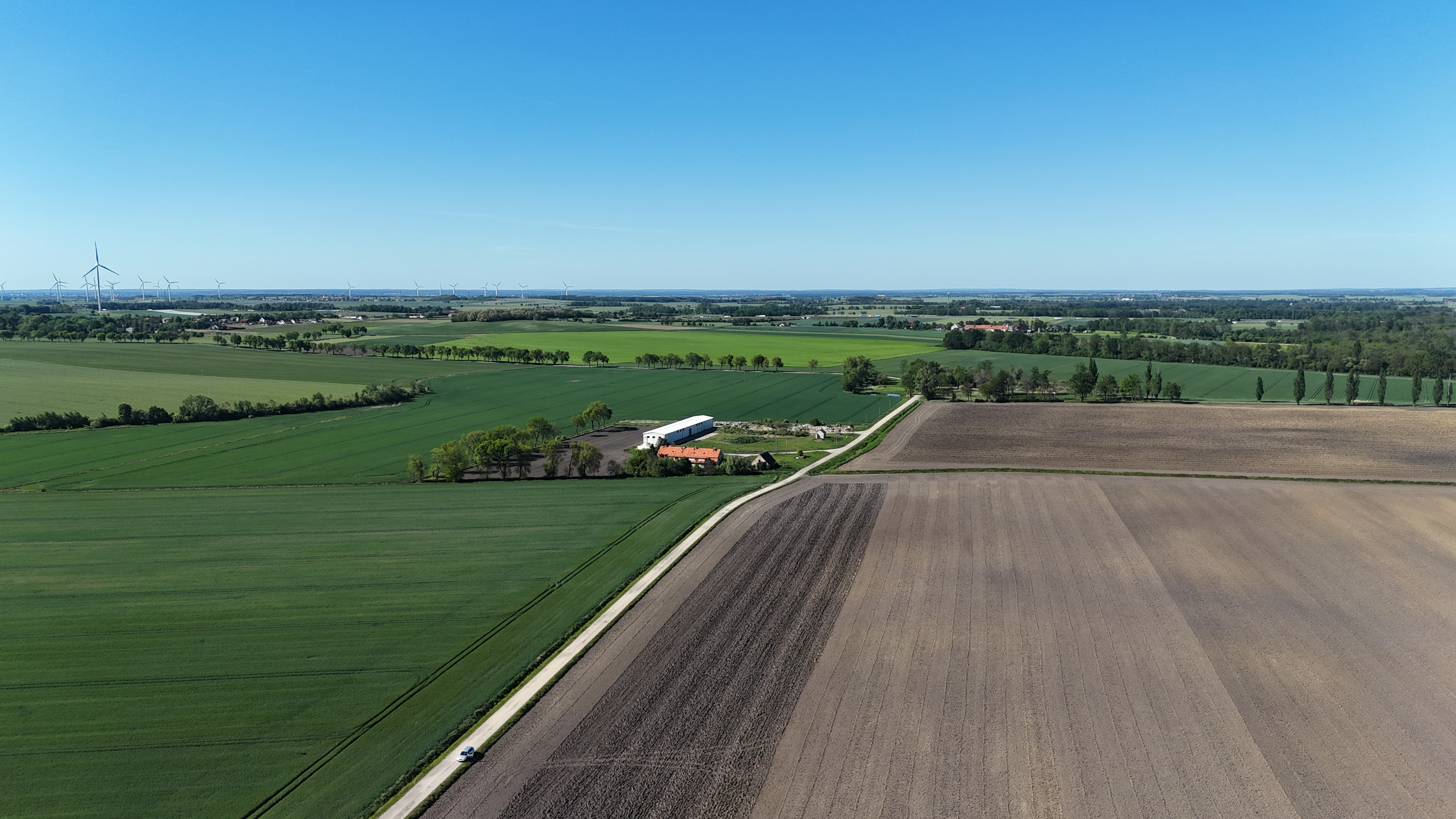

- Location within Poland
- Coordinates: 51°6′33″N 16°21′5″E
- Country: Poland
- Voivodeship: Lower Silesian
- County: Jawor
- Gmina: Wądroże Wielkie

Augustów [auˈɡustuf] is a settlement in Gmina Wądroże Wielkie, Jawor County, Lower Silesian Voivodeship, in south-western Poland.

From 1975 to 1998 the village was in Legnica Voivodeship.
