= Biernatki, Lower Silesian Voivodeship =

Biernatki
- Village
- Location within Poland
- Coordinates: 51°08′24″N 16°21′18″E
- Country: Poland
- Voivodeship: Lower Silesian
- Powiat: Jawor
- Gmina: Wądroże Wielkie

Biernatki [bjɛrˈnatki] is a village in the administrative district of Gmina Wądroże Wielkie, within Jawor County, Lower Silesian Voivodeship, in south-western Poland.
