= Godziszowa =

- Village
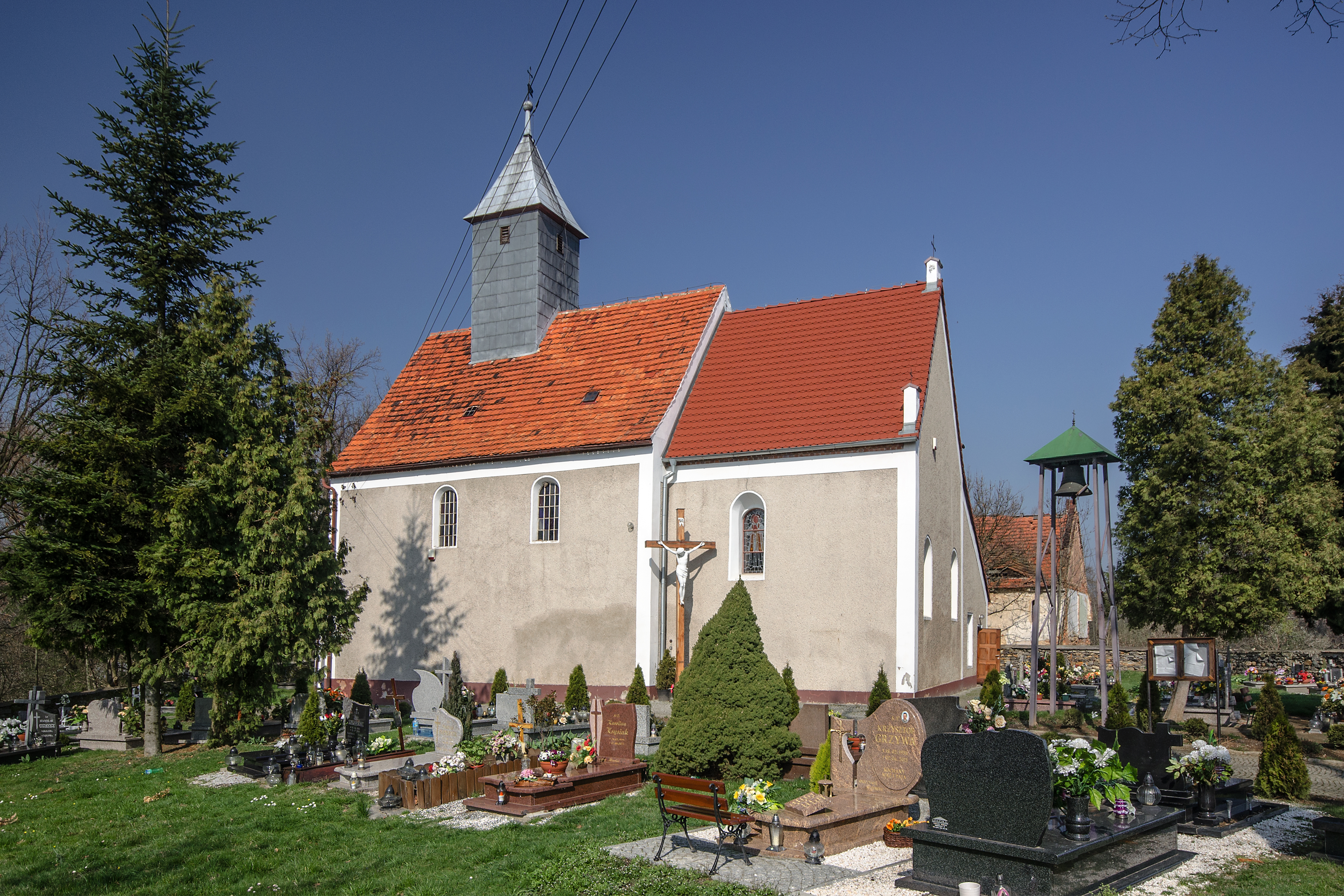
- Saint Stephen Church

- Location within Poland
- Coordinates: 51°05′47″N 16°12′41″E
- Country: Poland
- Voivodeship: Lower Silesian
- Powiat: Jawor
- Gmina: Mściwojów

Godziszowa [ɡɔd͡ʑiˈʂɔva] is a village in the administrative district of Gmina Mściwojów, within Jawor County, Lower Silesian Voivodeship, in south-western Poland.
