= Granowice =

- Village
- Location within Poland
- Coordinates: 51°04′38″N 16°21′05″E
- Country: Poland
- Voivodeship: Lower Silesian
- Powiat: Jawor
- Gmina: Wądroże Wielkie
- Time zone: UTC+1 (CET)
  - Summer (DST): UTC+2 (CEST)
- Vehicle registration: DJA

Granowice [ɡranɔˈvit͡sɛ] is a village in the administrative district of Gmina Wądroże Wielkie, within Jawor County, Lower Silesian Voivodeship, in south-western Poland.

== Sport ==
The village is represented by the football club Rodło Granowice. Formed in 1946 the club incorporates the Rodło symbol into both its name and crest.
