= Jenków =

- Village
- Location within Poland
- Coordinates: 51°04′08″N 16°23′25″E
- Country: Poland
- Voivodeship: Lower Silesian
- County: Jawor
- Gmina: Wądroże Wielkie

Jenków [ˈjɛnkuf] is a village in the administrative district of Gmina Wądroże Wielkie, within Jawor County, Lower Silesian Voivodeship, in south-western Poland.
