= Mąkolice =

Mąkolice may refer to the following places in Poland:

- Mąkolice, Lower Silesian Voivodeship (south-west Poland)
- Mąkolice, Piotrków County in Łódź Voivodeship (central Poland)
- Mąkolice, Zgierz County in Łódź Voivodeship (central Poland)
