= Pawłowice Wielkie =

- Village
- Location within Poland
- Coordinates: 51°6′N 16°16′E
- Country: Poland
- Voivodeship: Lower Silesian
- County: Jawor
- Gmina: Wądroże Wielkie

Pawłowice Wielkie [pavwɔˈvit͡sɛ ˈvjɛlkʲɛ] is a village in the administrative district of Gmina Wądroże Wielkie, within Jawor County, Lower Silesian Voivodeship, in south-western Poland.
