= Budziszów Wielki =

- Village
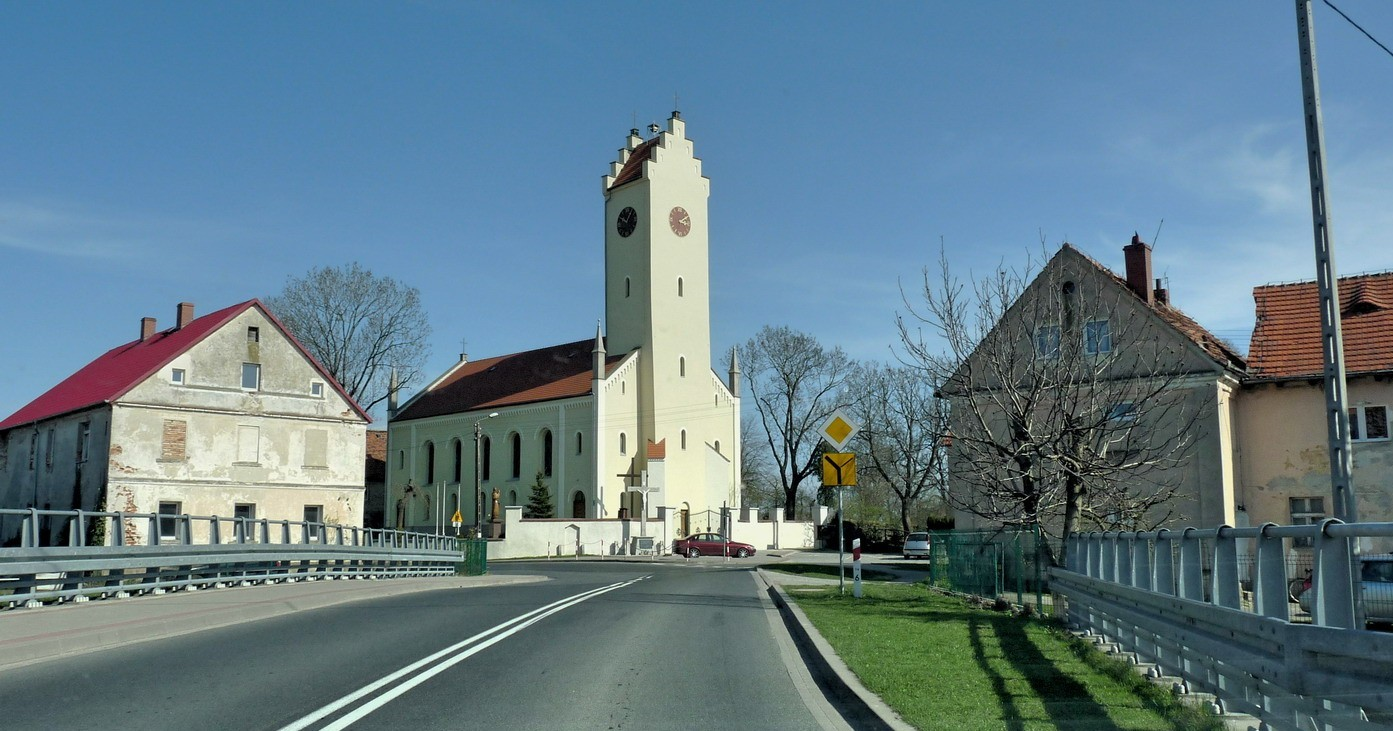

- Location within Poland
- Coordinates: 51°5′N 16°26′E
- Country: Poland
- Voivodeship: Lower Silesian
- County: Jawor
- Gmina: Wądroże Wielkie

Budziszów Wielki (Polish pronunciation: [buˈdʑiʂuv ˈvjɛlkʲi]) is a village in the administrative district of Gmina Wądroże Wielkie, within Jawor County, Lower Silesian Voivodeship, in south-western Poland.

== Notable residents ==
- Günter Simon (born 1933), German journalist
