= Marcinowice =

Marcinowice may refer to the following places in Poland:

- Marcinowice, Jawor County in Lower Silesian Voivodeship (south-west Poland)
- Marcinowice, Świdnica County in Lower Silesian Voivodeship (south-west Poland)
- Marcinowice, Lesser Poland Voivodeship (south Poland)
- Marcinowice, Lubusz Voivodeship (west Poland)
