= Budziszów Mały =

- Village
- Location within Poland
- Coordinates: 51°05′48″N 16°27′39″E
- Country: Poland
- Voivodeship: Lower Silesian
- Powiat: Jawor
- Gmina: Wądroże Wielkie

Budziszów Mały [buˈd͡ʑiʂuf ˈmawɨ] (German: Klein Baudiß) is a village in the administrative district of Gmina Wądroże Wielkie, within Jawor County, Lower Silesian Voivodeship, in south-western Poland.
