= Dobrzany (disambiguation) =

Dobrzany is a town in Stargard County, West Pomeranian Voivodeship, north-west Poland.

Dobrzany may also refer to:

- Gmina Dobrzany, an administrative district in Stargard County, West Pomeranian Voivodeship, north-west Poland
- Dobrzany, Lower Silesian Voivodeship (south-west Poland)

== See also ==
- Dobriany, Stryi Raion, Lviv Oblast, Ukraine
