= Czarnków (disambiguation) =

Czarnków may refer to the following places in Poland:

- Czarnków, a town in Greater Poland Voivodeship, west-central Poland
- Czarnków, Lower Silesian Voivodeship, a village in Legnica County, Lower Silesian Voivodeship (SW Poland)
