= Snowidza =

- Village
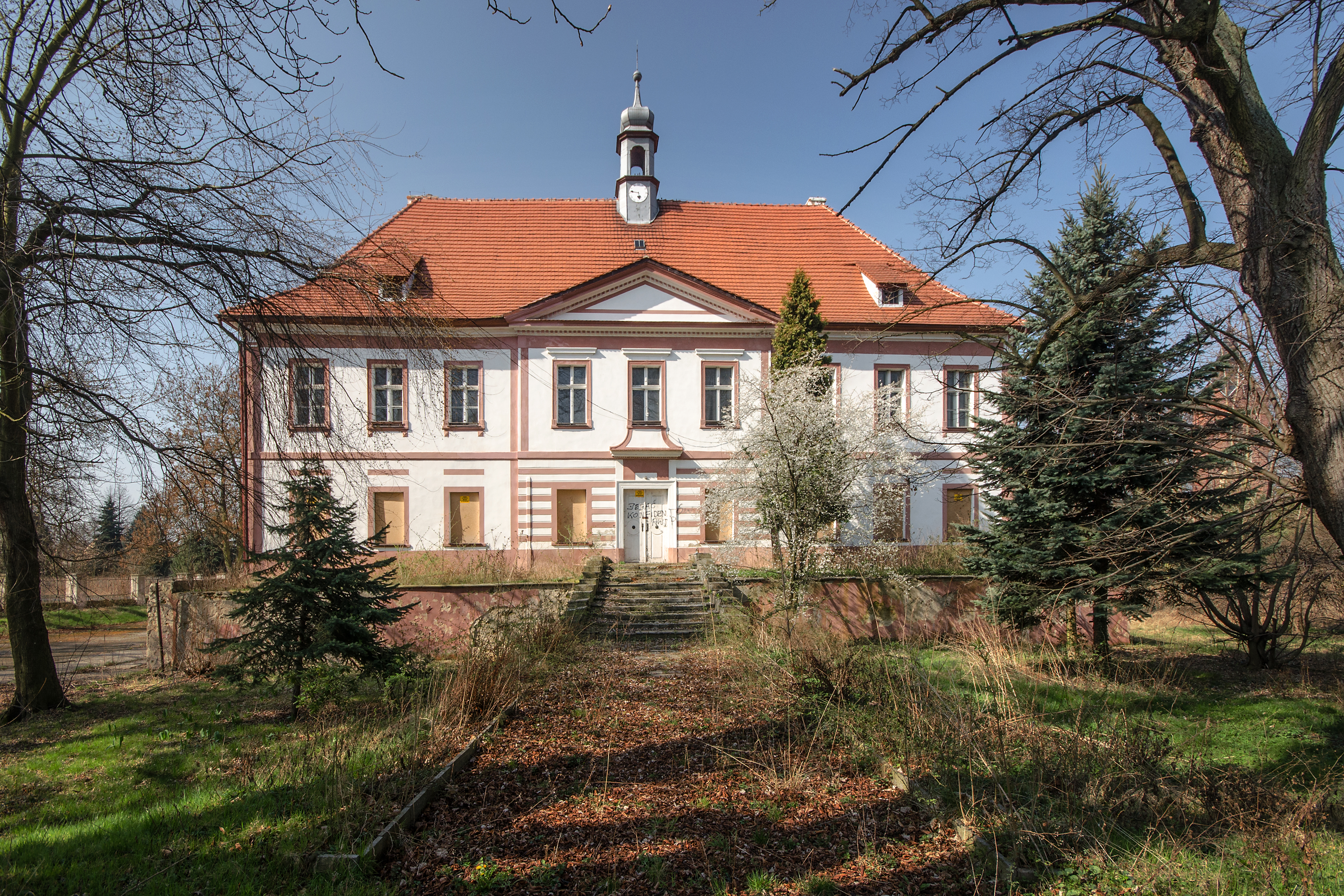
- Manor

- Location within Poland
- Coordinates: 51°5′N 16°15′E
- Country: Poland
- Voivodeship: Lower Silesian
- Powiat: Jawor
- Gmina: Mściwojów

Snowidza [snɔˈvid͡za] (German: Hertwigswaldau) is a village in the administrative district of Gmina Mściwojów, within Jawor County, Lower Silesian Voivodeship, in south-western Poland.
