= Kępy =

Kępy may refer to the following places in Poland:

- Kępy, Lower Silesian Voivodeship (south-west Poland)
- Kępy, West Pomeranian Voivodeship (north-west Poland)
