= Kłębanowice =

Kłębanowice may refer to the following places in Poland:

- Kłębanowice, Legnica County in Gmina Legnickie Pole, Legnica County in Lower Silesian Voivodeship, (SW Poland)
- Kłębanowice, Polkowice County in Gmina Radwanice, Polkowice County in Lower Silesian Voivodeship (SW Poland)
