= Targoszyn =

- Village
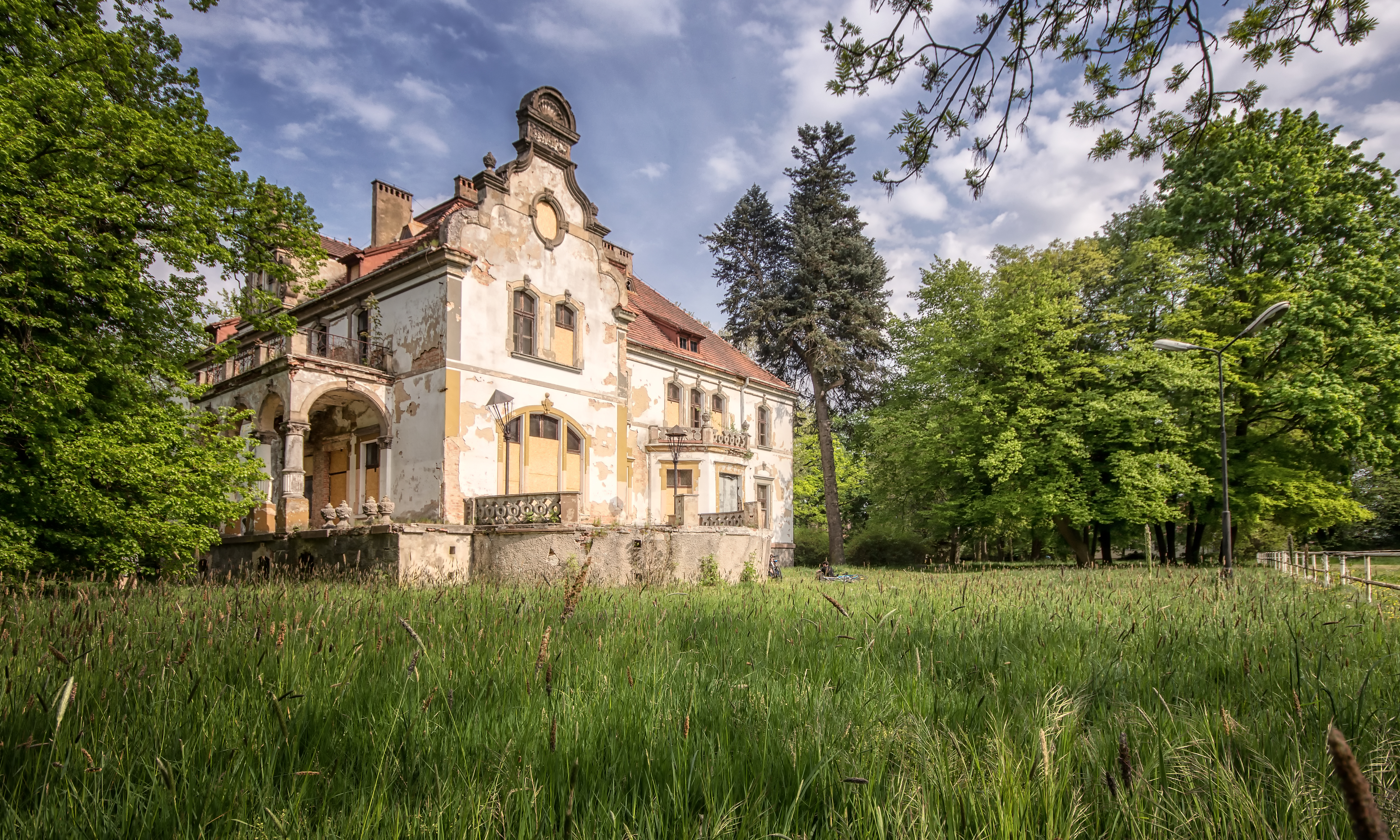
- Palace

- Location within Poland
- Coordinates: 51°2′N 16°18′E
- Country: Poland
- Voivodeship: Lower Silesian
- County: Jawor
- Gmina: Mściwojów
- Elevation: 205 m (673 ft)

Targoszyn [tarˈɡɔʂɨn] (German: Bersdorf) is a village in the administrative district of Gmina Mściwojów, within Jawor County, Lower Silesian Voivodeship, in south-western Poland.
