= Strachowice =

Strachowice may refer to several places in Poland:

- Strachowice, Legnica County, Lower Silesian Voivodeship
- Strachowice, Wrocław
- Wrocław Airport, or Wrocław-Strachowice Airport

== See also ==
- Starachowice, Świętokrzyskie Voivodeship
