= Niedaszów =

- Village
- Location within Poland
- Coordinates: 51°2′N 16°15′E
- Country: Poland
- Voivodeship: Lower Silesian
- County: Jawor
- Gmina: Mściwojów
- Time zone: UTC+1 (CET)
  - Summer (DST): UTC+2 (CEST)
- Vehicle registration: DJA

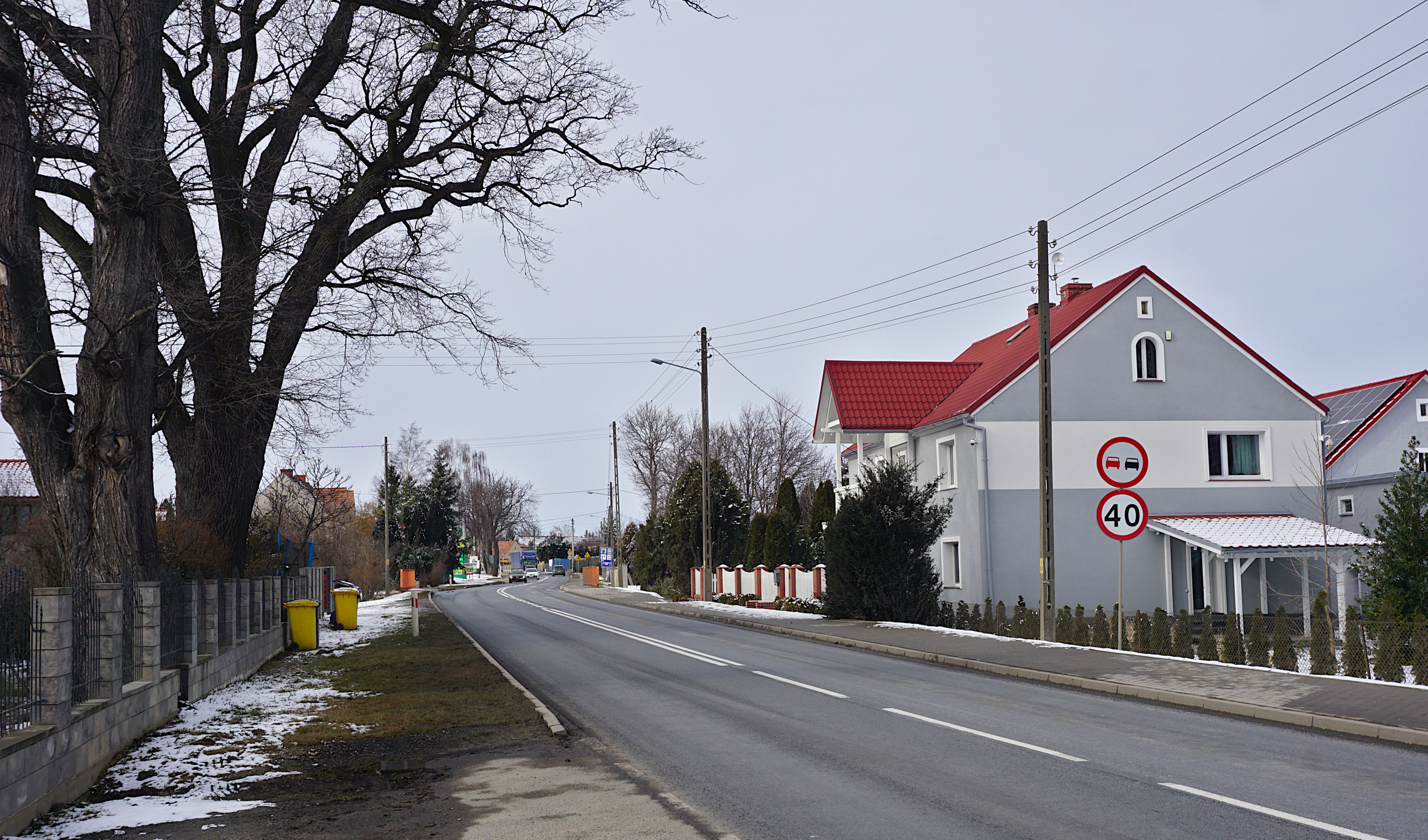
Niedaszów

Niedaszów [ɲɛˈdaʂuf] (German: Herzogswaldau) is a village in the administrative district of Gmina Mściwojów, within Jawor County, Lower Silesian Voivodeship, in south-western Poland.
