= Sobolew, Lower Silesian Voivodeship =

Sobolew
- Village
- Location within Poland
- Coordinates: 51°07′15″N 16°26′03″E
- Country: Poland
- Voivodeship: Lower Silesian
- County: Jawor
- Gmina: Wądroże Wielkie

Sobolew [sɔˈbɔlɛf] is a village in the administrative district of Gmina Wądroże Wielkie, within Jawor County, Lower Silesian Voivodeship, in south-western Poland.
