= Bronisław Geremek =

Polish social historian and politician (1932–2008)

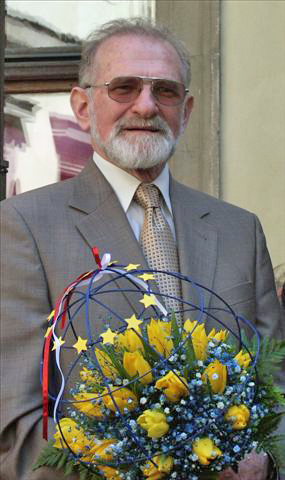
- Geremek in 2004

Minister of Foreign Affairs of Poland 5th Minister of Foreign Affairs of the Third Republic of Poland
- In office 31 October 1997 – 30 June 2000
- President: Aleksander Kwaśniewski
- Prime Minister: Jerzy Buzek
- Preceded by: Dariusz Rosati
- Succeeded by: Władysław Bartoszewski

Chairman of the Freedom Union
- In office 18 December 2000 – 14 October 2001
- Preceded by: Leszek Balcerowicz
- Succeeded by: Władysław Frasyniuk

Personal details
- Born: Benjamin Lewertow; 6 March 1932 Warsaw, Poland
- Died: 13 July 2008 (aged 76) Lubień, Poland
- Party: Freedom Union, Partia Demokratyczna – demokraci.pl. (Democratic Party)
- Spouse: Hanna Geremek
- Profession: Historian

Bronisław Geremek (Polish pronunciation: [brɔˈɲiswav ɡɛˈrɛmɛk]; born Benjamin Lewertow; 6 March 1932 – 13 July 2008) was a Polish social historian and politician. He was an opposition activist in the Polish People's Republic and participated in the Polish Round Table Agreement.

Geremek served as Member of Parliament (1991–2001), Minister of Foreign Affairs (1997–2000), leader of the Freedom Union (2000–2001), as well as Member of the European Parliament (2004–2008). In 2002, he was awarded Poland's highest order of merit, Order of the White Eagle.

== Early life and education ==
Bronisław Geremek was born as Benjamin Lewertow in Warsaw on 6 March 1932. His Jewish father Boruch Lewertow, a fur merchant, was murdered in Auschwitz. Benjamin and his mother, Sharca, were smuggled out of the Warsaw Ghetto in 1943 and were sheltered by Stefan Geremek. Stefan Geremek later married Bronisław's mother, and Bronisław was further raised in the Roman Catholic tradition.

In his adult life, Geremek considered himself neither Jewish nor Catholic. His Jewish grandfather had been a maggid; his brother, Jerry Lewart, lived in New York as a Jew, and his sons living in Poland were Roman Catholics.

In 1954, Bronisław Geremek graduated from the Faculty of History at the Warsaw University. In 1956–1958, he completed postgraduate studies at the École pratique des hautes études in Paris. He completed his PhD in 1960 and he was granted a postdoctoral degree at the Polish Academy of Sciences (PAN) in 1972. He was appointed associate professor in 1989.

== Academic career ==
Geremek's scholarly work chiefly focused on social history and medieval European society. His scholarly achievements included numerous articles and lectures, as well as ten books, which have been translated into ten languages. His doctoral thesis (1960) concerned the labour market in medieval Paris, including prostitution. His postdoctoral thesis (1972) examined underworld groups in medieval Paris.

Geremek spent most of his scholarly career at the Institute of History of the Polish Academy of Sciences, where he worked from 1955 to 1985. From 1960 to 1965, he was also a lecturer at the Sorbonne in Paris, as well as the manager of the Polish Culture Centre of that university. Geremek was given honorary degrees by the University of Bologna, Utrecht University, the Sorbonne, Columbia University, Waseda University, and Jagiellonian University in Kraków. In 1992, he was designated visiting professor at the Collège de France. He was a member of Academia Europaea, the PEN Club, the Société Européenne de Culture, fellow of Collegium Invisibile and numerous other societies and associations. He was a longtime professor and Chairholder of the Chair of European Civilisation at the College of Europe until his death.

== Political activity ==
=== History of Poland (1945–1989) ===
In 1950, Geremek joined the Polish United Workers' Party (PZPR). He was the second secretary of the Basic Party Organisation (POP) of the PZPR at Warsaw University. In 1968, however, he left the party in protest against the Warsaw Pact invasion of Czechoslovakia.

During the 1970s, Geremek was considered one of the leading figures of the Polish democratic opposition. In 1978, he co-founded the Society for Educational Courses, for which he gave lectures. While on a fellowship at the Wilson Center in Washington DC, he met General Edward Rowny who introduced him to Lane Kirkland and Ronald Reagan. In August 1980, he joined the Gdańsk workers' protest movement and became one of the advisers of the Solidarity trade union. In 1981, he chaired the Program Commission of the First National Convention of Solidarity. After martial law was declared in December 1981, he was interned until December 1982, when he once again became an adviser to the then-illegal Solidarity, working closely with Lech Wałęsa. In 1983, he was again arrested by the Polish authorities.

=== History of Poland (1989–2008) ===
==== Polish Round Table Agreement ====
Between 1987 and 1989, Geremek was the leader of the Commission for Political Reforms of the Civic Committee, which prepared proposals for the democratic transformation in Poland. He played a crucial role in the 1989 Round Table talks.

==== Third Polish Republic ====
During Poland's transition into democracy, Geremek co-founded The Democratic Union (later merged into The Freedom Union) and was the leader of its parliamentary group from 1990 to 1997. After the 1991 elections, President Lech Wałęsa nominated him to form a new government, but after Geremek failed to receive a vote of confidence, Jan Olszewski was appointed prime minister instead.

From 1989 to 2001, Geremek was a member of the lower house of the Polish parliament, the Sejm, and chairman of the Political Council of the Freedom Union. He chaired the Sejm's Committee on Foreign Affairs from 1989 to 1997, its Constitutional Committee from 1989 to 1991 and its European Law Committee from 2000 to 2001.

After a coalition government was formed in October 1997 by the Solidarity Electoral Action (AWS) and the Freedom Union, Geremek served as Minister of Foreign Affairs under Prime Minister Jerzy Buzek until 2000. In 1998, Poland chaired OSCE, and Bronisław Geremek served as Chairperson-in-Office. In March 1999, he signed the treaty under which Poland joined NATO.

=== European Parliament Deputy ===
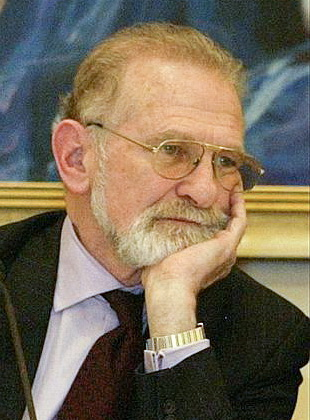
Bronisław Geremek in 2004

In the June 2004 European Parliament election, Geremek, running with the Freedom Union, received the highest number of votes in Warsaw. As Member of the European Parliament, he joined the Alliance of Liberals and Democrats for Europe. He was a believer in the idea of European integration, expressing the need to build a distinct European identity and to foster public belief in the benefits that Europe can bring not just to nations, but also individuals.

After a new vetting law was passed in 2007, requiring officials to declare that they never collaborated with the Communist secret service, Geremek declined to make such a declaration. However, later that year, Poland's Constitutional Tribunal declared key parts of the vetting law unconstitutional.

From 2006 to 2008, he was president of the Jean Monnet Foundation for Europe. He was a supporter of the Campaign for the Establishment of a United Nations Parliamentary Assembly.

== Honours ==
- 2004: Order of the Three Stars
- 2002: Order of the White Eagle
- Knight Grand Cross in the Order of Leopold II
- 2002: Knight Grand Cross of Order of the Cross of Terra Mariana
- 2000: Order of Merit of the Italian Republic
- Knight Commander's Cross of the Order of Merit of the Federal Republic of Germany
- 2002: Pour le Mérite
- Officer in the Legion of Honour
- 1998: Karlspreis (Charlemagne Award) of the city of Aachen
- 1997: Commander's Cross of the Order of the Lithuanian Grand Duke Gediminas
- Grand prix de la francophonie of the Académie française

== Death ==
Geremek died on 13 July 2008, in a car accident on the then national road 2 (currently national road 92) near Lubień in Nowy Tomyśl County, when his car struck an oncoming van on the opposite lane, due to Geremek falling asleep behind the wheel. He was granted a state funeral, which was held at St. John's Cathedral in Warsaw. It was attended, among others, by President Lech Kaczyński, Prime Minister Donald Tusk, Poland's last President-in-exile Ryszard Kaczorowski, and former presidents Lech Wałęsa and Aleksander Kwaśniewski.

== Posthumous honours ==
In January 2009, the central courtyard of Louise Weiss, the principal building of the European Parliament in Strasbourg, was named after Bronisław Geremek.

In 2021, the Senate of Poland established 2022 as the "Year of Bronisław Geremek" in recognition of his life's achievements.

== Publications ==
- Litość i szubienica: dzieje nędzy i miłosierdzia (Czytelnik 1989, ISBN 83-07-01490-5)
- Świat "opery żebraczej": obraz włóczęgów i nędzarzy w literaturach europejskich XV-XVII wieku (Państwowy Instytut Wydawniczy 1989, ISBN 83-06-00428-0)
- Rok 1989 – Bronisław Geremek opowiada, Jacek Żakowski pyta (red.: Maria Braunstein; Plejada, Dom Słowa Polskiego 1990)
- The Margins of Society in Late Medieval Paris (Past and Present Publications) by Jean-Claude Schmitt, Bronislaw Geremek, Lyndal Roper, Jean Birrell
- Wspólne pasje (wespół z Georgesem Duby; rozmowę przeprowadził Philippe Sainteny; przeł. Elżbieta Teresa Sadowska; PWN 1995, ISBN 83-01-11855-5)
- Szansa i zagrożenie. Polityka i dyplomacja w rodzinnej Europie (Studio EMKA 2004, ISBN 83-88607-38-3)

=== Translations ===
- Fernand Braudel, Historia i trwanie (seria: "Nowy Sympozjon"; przedmową opatrzyli Bronisław Geremek i Witold Kula; Czytelnik 1971, 1999, ISBN 83-07-02712-8)
