= Barycz, Lower Silesian Voivodeship =

Barycz
- Village
- Location within Poland
- Coordinates: 51°05′49″N 16°15′15″E
- Country: Poland
- Voivodeship: Lower Silesian
- Powiat: Jawor
- Gmina: Mściwojów
- Time zone: UTC+1 (CET)
  - Summer (DST): UTC+2 (CEST)
- Vehicle registration: DJA

Barycz [ˈbarɨt͡ʂ] is a village in the administrative district of Gmina Mściwojów, within Jawor County, Lower Silesian Voivodeship, in south-western Poland.
