= Kosiska, Lower Silesian Voivodeship =

Kosiska
- Village
- Location within Poland
- Coordinates: 51°07′14″N 16°24′56″E
- Country: Poland
- Voivodeship: Lower Silesian
- County: Jawor
- Gmina: Wądroże Wielkie
- Population: 146

Kosiska [kɔˈɕiska] is a village in the administrative district of Gmina Wądroże Wielkie, within Jawor County, Lower Silesian Voivodeship, in south-western Poland.
