= Gądków =

- Village
- Location within Poland
- Coordinates: 51°5′0″N 16°23′44″E
- Country: Poland
- Voivodeship: Lower Silesian
- County: Jawor
- Gmina: Wądroże Wielkie

Gądków [ˈɡɔntkuf] is a village in the administrative district of Gmina Wądroże Wielkie, within Jawor County, Lower Silesian Voivodeship, in south-western Poland.
