= Skała, Jawor County =

Skała
- Village
- Location within Poland
- Coordinates: 51°5′5″N 16°18′9″E
- Country: Poland
- Voivodeship: Lower Silesian
- County: Jawor
- Gmina: Wądroże Wielkie

Skała [ˈskawa] is a village in the administrative district of Gmina Wądroże Wielkie, within Jawor County, Lower Silesian Voivodeship, in south-western Poland.
