= Postolice =

- Village
- Location within Poland
- Coordinates: 51°7′N 16°26′E
- Country: Poland
- Voivodeship: Lower Silesian
- Powiat: Jawor
- Gmina: Wądroże Wielkie

Postolice [pɔstɔˈlit͡sɛ] is a village in the administrative district of Gmina Wądroże Wielkie, within Jawor County, Lower Silesian Voivodeship, in south-western Poland.
