= Zimnik =

- Village
- Location within Poland
- Coordinates: 51°0′34″N 16°15′26″E
- Country: Poland
- Voivodeship: Lower Silesian
- County: Jawor
- Gmina: Mściwojów

Zimnik [ˈʑimnik] (German: Kalthaus) is a village in the administrative district of Gmina Mściwojów, within Jawor County, Lower Silesian Voivodeship, in south-western Poland.
