= Luboradz, Lower Silesian Voivodeship =

Luboradz
- Village
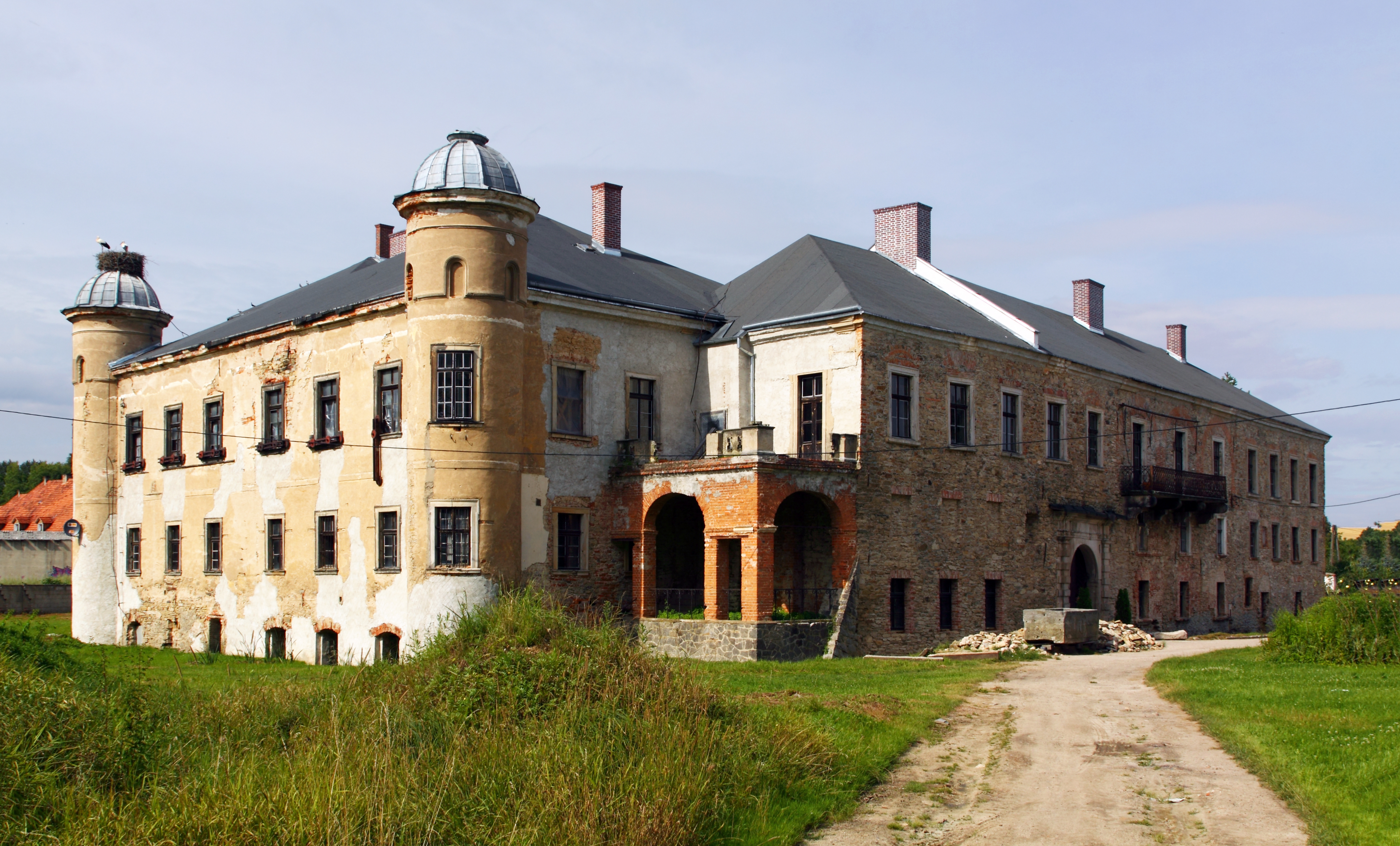
- Castle in Luboradz

- Location within Poland
- Coordinates: 51°3′N 16°17′E
- Country: Poland
- Voivodeship: Lower Silesian
- Powiat: Jawor
- Gmina: Mściwojów
- Time zone: UTC+1 (CET)
  - Summer (DST): UTC+2 (CEST)
- Vehicle registration: DJA

Luboradz [luˈbɔrat͡s] is a village in the administrative district of Gmina Mściwojów, within Jawor County, Lower Silesian Voivodeship, in southwestern Poland.
