= Dobrzany, Lower Silesian Voivodeship =

Dobrzany
- Settlement
- Location within Poland
- Coordinates: 51°5′33″N 16°21′38″E
- Country: Poland
- Voivodeship: Lower Silesian
- County: Jawor
- Gmina: Wądroże Wielkie
- Population: 0

Dobrzany is a former settlement in Gmina Wądroże Wielkie, Jawor County, Lower Silesian Voivodeship, in south-western Poland.

From 1975 to 1998 the village was in Legnica Voivodeship.
