= Mierczyce =

- Village
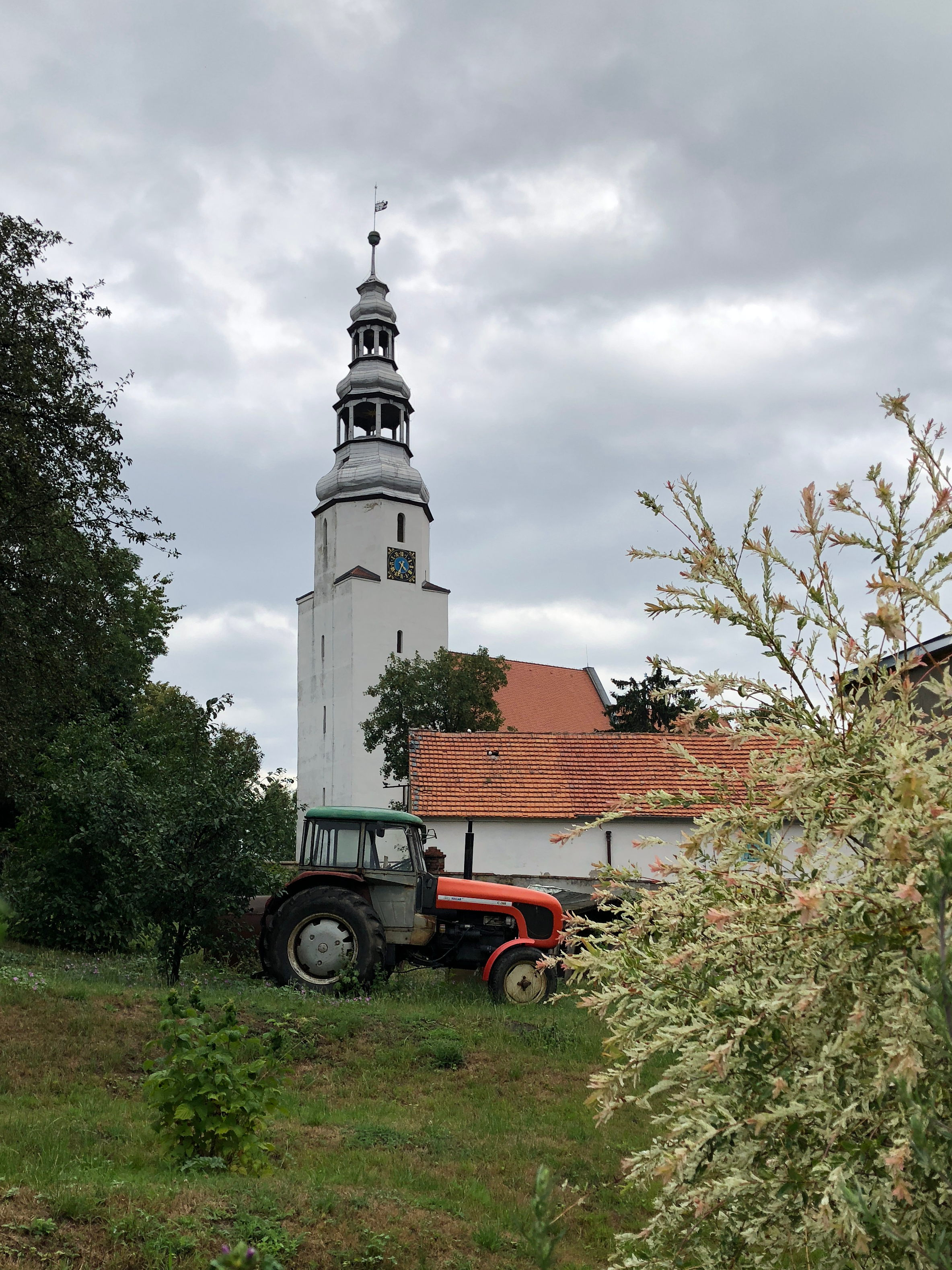
- Church in Mierczyce

- Location within Poland
- Coordinates: 51°5′27″N 16°18′47″E
- Country: Poland
- Voivodeship: Lower Silesian
- County: Jawor
- Gmina: Wądroże Wielkie
- Elevation: 150 m (490 ft)
- Website: http://www.mierczyce.pl/

Mierczyce [mjɛrˈt͡ʂɨt͡sɛ] is a village in the administrative district of Gmina Wądroże Wielkie, within Jawor County, Lower Silesian Voivodeship, in south-western Poland.

== Notable people ==
- Bolko von Richthofen (1899–1983) German archaeologist
