= Wądroże Małe =

- Village
- Location within Poland
- Coordinates: 51°07′N 16°19′E
- Country: Poland
- Voivodeship: Lower Silesian
- Powiat: Jawor
- Gmina: Wądroże Wielkie
- Population: 200

Wądroże Małe [vɔnˈdrɔʐɛ ˈmawɛ] is a village in the administrative district of Gmina Wądroże Wielkie, within Jawor County, Lower Silesian Voivodeship, in south-western Poland.
