= Figlów =

- Settlement
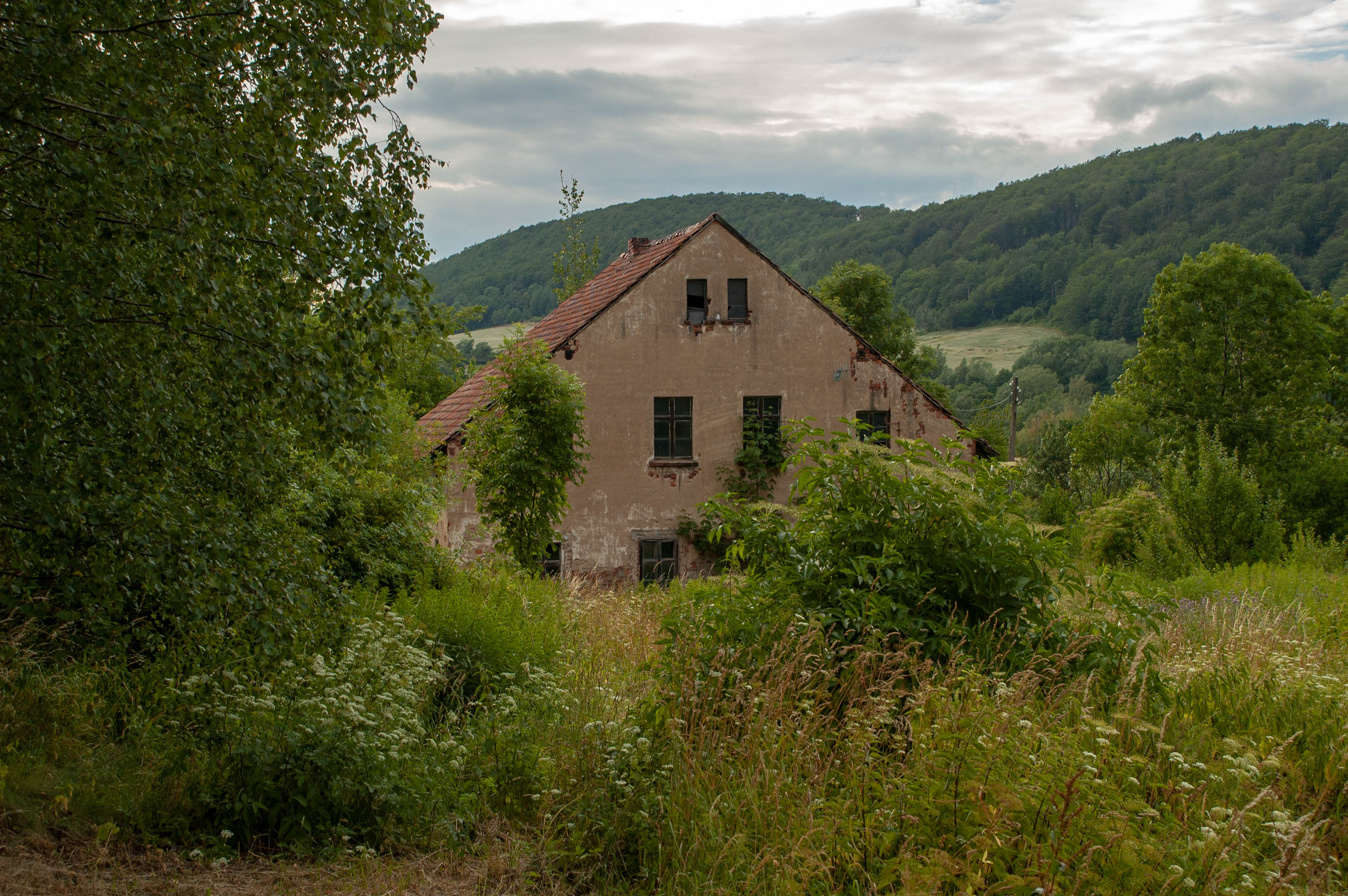
- An abandoned house

- Location within Poland
- Coordinates: 50°52′08″N 16°08′27″E
- Country: Poland
- Voivodeship: Lower Silesian
- County: Jawor
- Gmina: Bolków
- Sołectwo: Sady Górne
- Elevation: 460 m (1,510 ft)

Figlów is a settlement in Gmina Bolków, Jawor County, Lower Silesian Voivodeship, in south-western Poland.

From 1975 to 1998 the village was in Jelenia Góra Voivodeship.

== Gallery ==
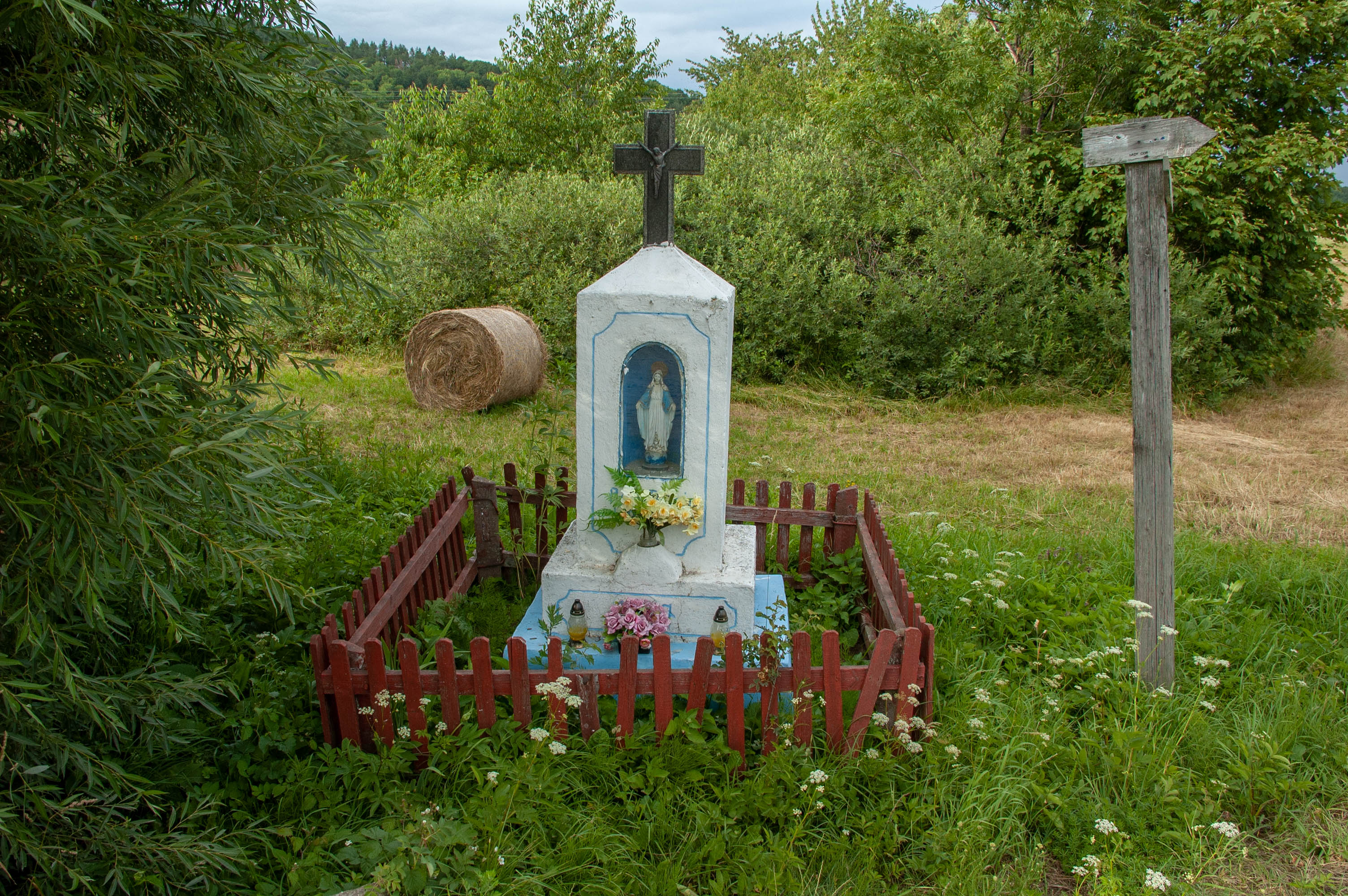
Wayside shrine

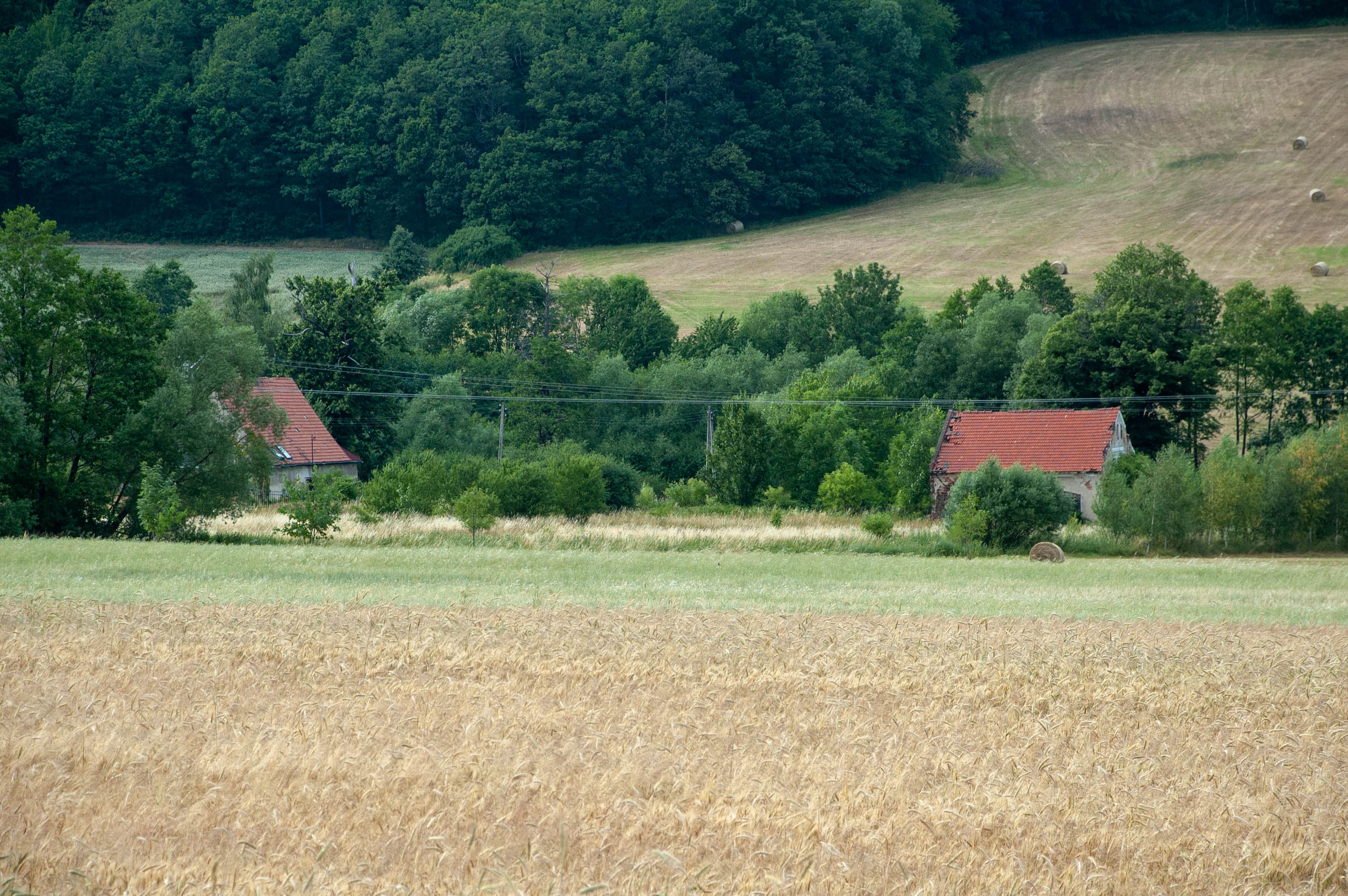
Houses from the distance

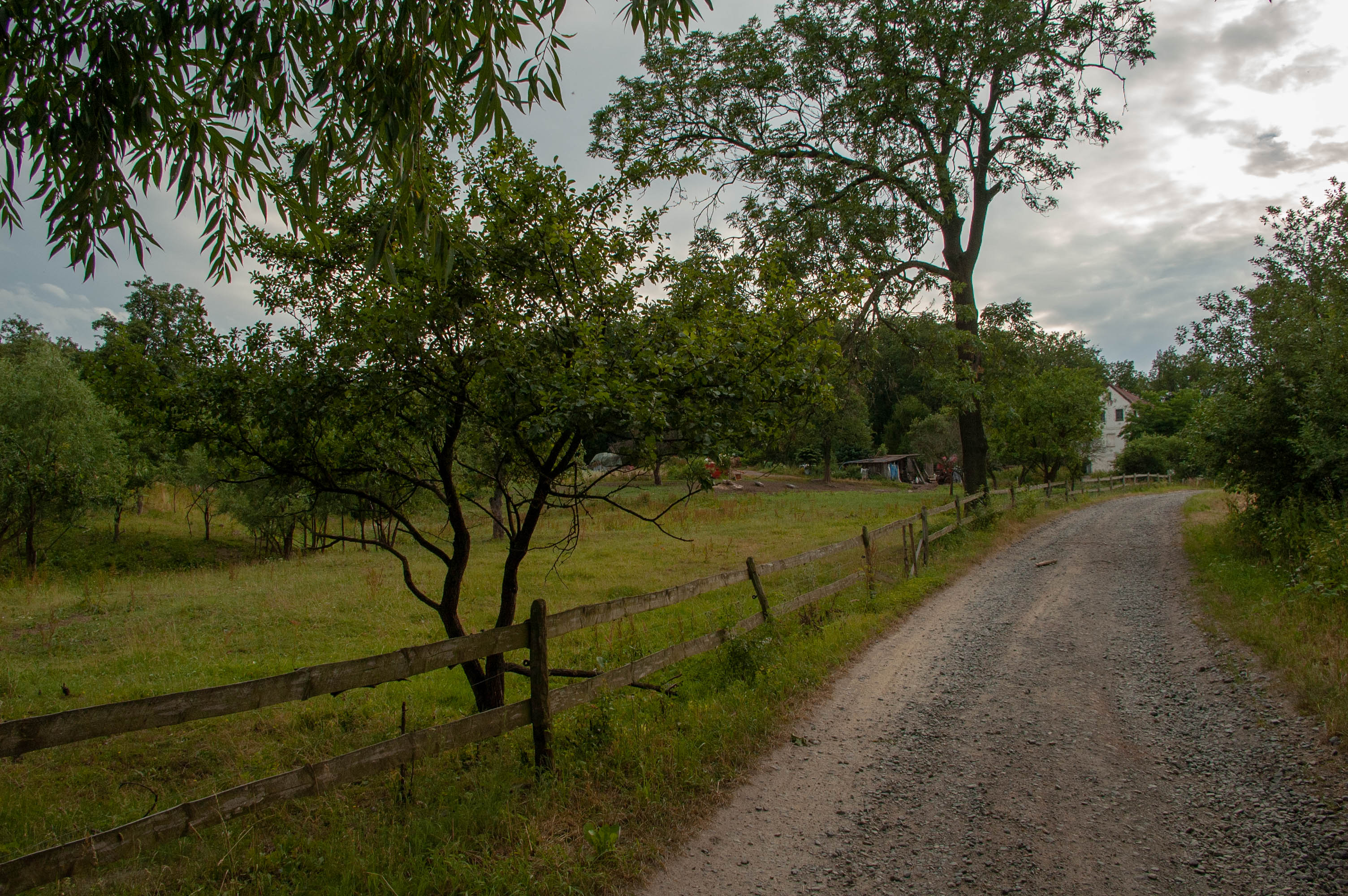
Hardens by the road

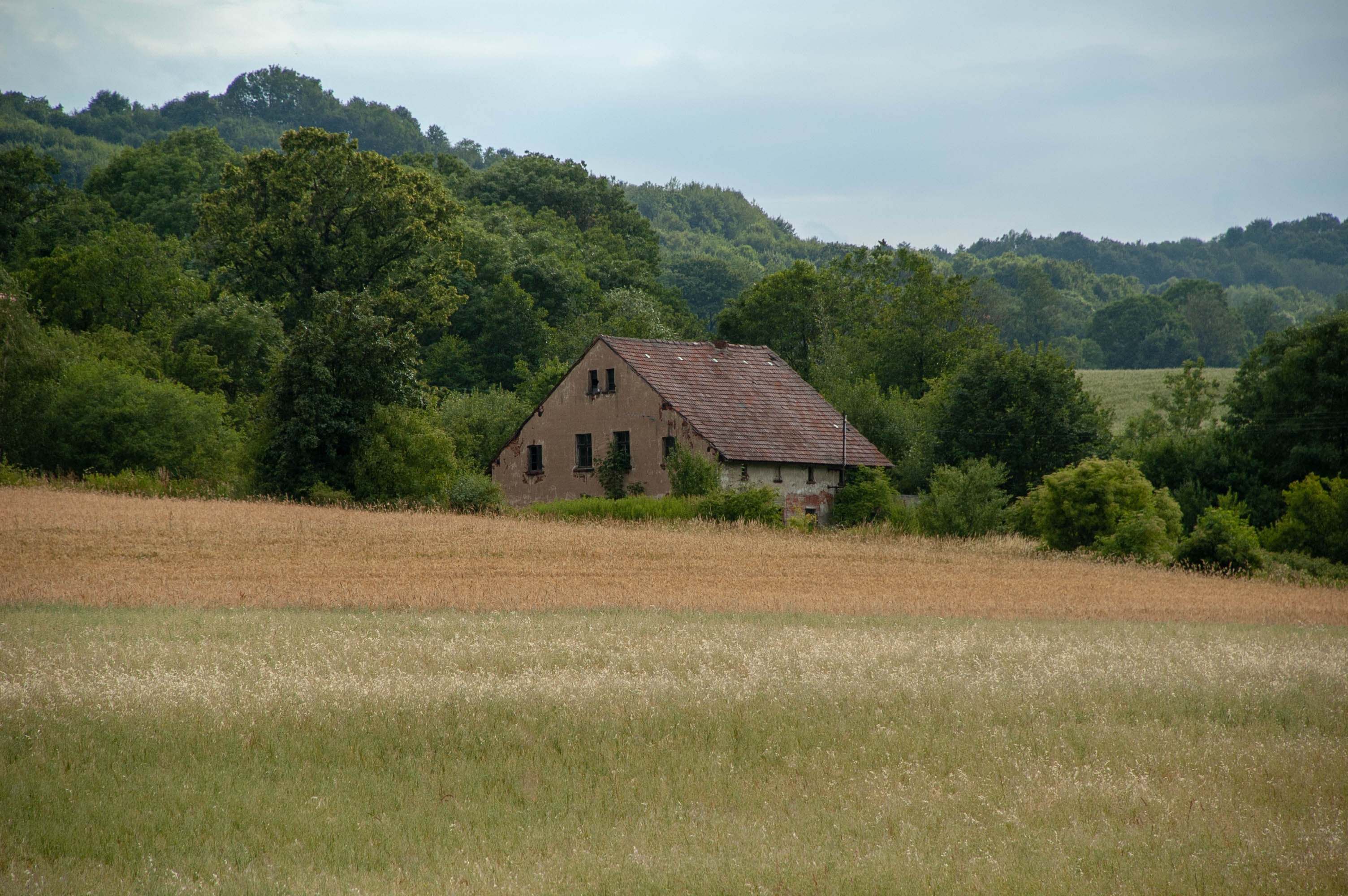
Abandoned house from the distance
