= Rąbienice =

- Village
- Location within Poland
- Coordinates: 51°05′45″N 16°23′54″E
- Country: Poland
- Voivodeship: Lower Silesian
- Powiat: Jawor
- Gmina: Wądroże Wielkie

Rąbienice [rɔmbjɛˈnit͡sɛ] is a village in the administrative district of Gmina Wądroże Wielkie, within Jawor County, Lower Silesian Voivodeship, in south-western Poland.
