= Drzymałowice =

- Village
- Location within Poland
- Coordinates: 51°03′21″N 16°18′38″E
- Country: Poland
- Voivodeship: Lower Silesian
- Powiat: Jawor
- Gmina: Mściwojów

Drzymałowice [dʐɨmawɔˈvit͡sɛ] (German: Dittersdorf) is a village in the administrative district of Gmina Mściwojów, within Jawor County, Lower Silesian Voivodeship, in south-western Poland.
