= Bielany, Lower Silesian Voivodeship =

Bielany
- Village
- Location within Poland
- Coordinates: 51°04′52″N 16°24′47″E
- Country: Poland
- Voivodeship: Lower Silesian
- Powiat: Jawor
- Gmina: Wądroże Wielkie

Bielany [bjɛˈlanɨ] is a village in the administrative district of Gmina Wądroże Wielkie, within Jawor County, Lower Silesian Voivodeship, in south-western Poland.
