= Bolko von Richthofen =

German archaeologist (1899–1983)

Bolko von Richthofen (September 13, 1899 – March 18, 1983) was a German archaeologist and a distant relative of the family of Manfred von Richthofen, the "Red Baron". He is sometimes confused with his distant cousin and namesake, Karl Bolko von Richthofen (1903–1971) – the youngest brother of the fighter ace.

Richthofen was born in Mertschütz (Polish Mierczyce), Silesia, and fought in World War I. After the war ended, he participated as a Freikorps volunteer during the Silesian Uprisings. In the early post-war period he entered tertiary studies and quickly became an eminent scholar.

A member of the NSDAP from 1933, he wrote several antisemitic and anti-Slavic works. During World War II he worked in the antisemitic Ahnenerbe organisation.

He is well known for a bitter dispute about the ethnicity of the Lusatian and Pomeranian cultures with the Polish archaeologist Józef Kostrzewski.

In 1964 he received the Bundesverdienstkreuz. He died in Seehausen am Staffelsee, Bavaria.
