= Mściwojów =

- Village
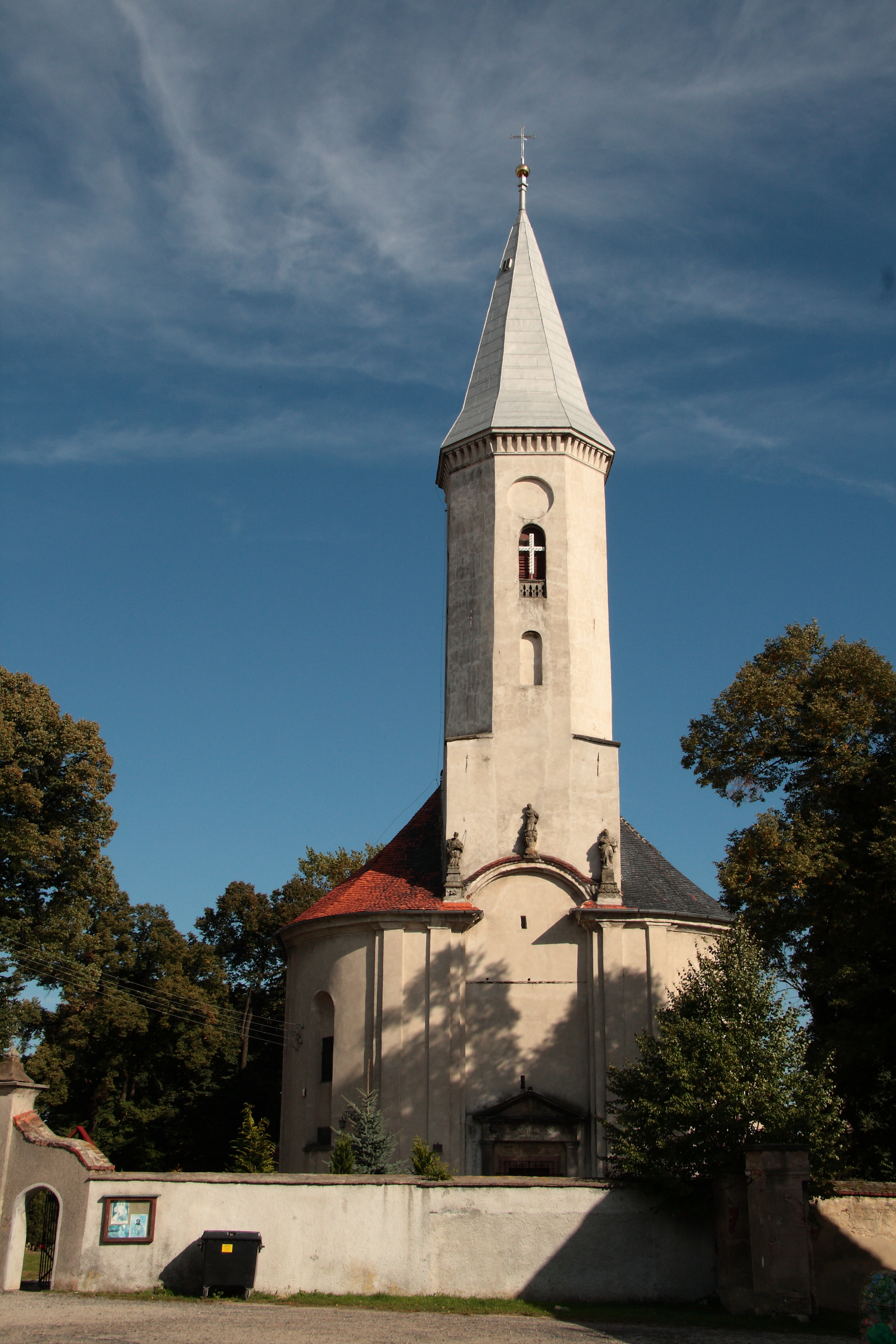
- Church of the Visitation of the Virgin Mary

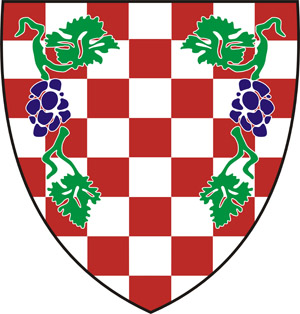
- Coat of arms

- Location within Poland
- Coordinates: 51°02′30″N 16°16′08″E
- Country: Poland
- Voivodeship: Lower Silesian
- County: Jawor
- Gmina: Mściwojów

Mściwojów [mɕt͡ɕiˈvɔjuf] is a village in Jawor County, Lower Silesian Voivodeship, in south-western Poland. It is the seat of the administrative district (gmina) called Gmina Mściwojów.

On the Wierzbiak River flowing through the village, a small retention reservoir was built with a self-cleaning system based on planting appropriate reed vegetation. This body of water is popular with tourists as a place for recreation.

There is an observation tower on the shore of the lake. From the top of the tower, you can see Rogoźnica on the other side of the reservoir very well.
