= Raczkowa =

- Village
- Location within Poland
- Coordinates: 51°08′25″N 16°11′54″E
- Country: Poland
- Voivodeship: Lower Silesian
- County: Legnica
- Gmina: Legnickie Pole

Raczkowa [rat͡ʂˈkɔva] is a village in the administrative district of Gmina Legnickie Pole, within Legnica County, Lower Silesian Voivodeship, in south-western Poland.
