= Günter Simon =

German journalist

- Born: 6 May 1933 (age 93); Großbaudis, Liegnitz, Lower Silesia, Germany
- Occupations: Journalist; Newspaper editor Trades union official writer

Günter Simon (born Großbaudis, Liegnitz 6 May 1933) is a German journalist.

Between 1981 and 1989 he was chief editor of Tribüne, the weekly newspaper of the Free German Trade Union Federation.

== Life ==
=== Early years ===
Born the son of an agricultural worker in Lower Silesia, Simon received an education that included lower, middle and upper schools, successfully obtaining his Abitur. By this time the German Democratic Republic had come into being, based on what had previously been the Soviet occupation zone. The frontier dividing Germany from Poland had moved west, and Simon was among the millions of Germans who had been relocated as part of the process. He joined East Germany's ruling SED (party) in 1950. He studied Journalism at Leipzig University between 1952 and 1955, emerging with a university-level qualification in journalism.

=== The journalist ===
He served an apprenticeship with the newspaper Neuer Tag in Frankfurt an der Oder during 1954/55 before taking a position as a junior editor and foreign news section leader for Tribüne, the weekly newspaper of the Free German Trade Union Federation (FDGB): between 1963 and 1967 he served as a member of Tribüne's editorial collective.

In 1967 Simon was appointed deputy chief editor of Tribüne. In 1975 he was sent to become the Tribüne's Bonn correspondent before returning to his position of deputy chief editor, which was now combined with the "Chief Editor for Trades Union Life" position. On 15 September, he was appointed chief editor of Tribüne, in succession to Claus Friedrich, remaining in the post till 1989.

On 23 September 1981, he was co-opted for the 14th session of the FDGB executive committee and elected to membership of its presidium, another function which he retained till 1989.

== Awards ==
- Fritz Heckert Medal (1967)
- Journalists' Prize of the Free German Trade Union Federation (1973)
- Patriotic Order of Merit (Vaterländischer Verdienstorden) in Silver (1977)
- Hermann Duncker Medal (1985)
