= Psary, Legnica County =

Psary
- Village
- Location within Poland
- Coordinates: 51°09′56″N 16°14′16″E
- Country: Poland
- Voivodeship: Lower Silesian
- County: Legnica
- Gmina: Legnickie Pole

Psary [ˈpsarɨ] is a village in the administrative district of Gmina Legnickie Pole, within Legnica County, Lower Silesian Voivodeship, in south-western Poland.
