= Wądroże Wielkie =

- Village
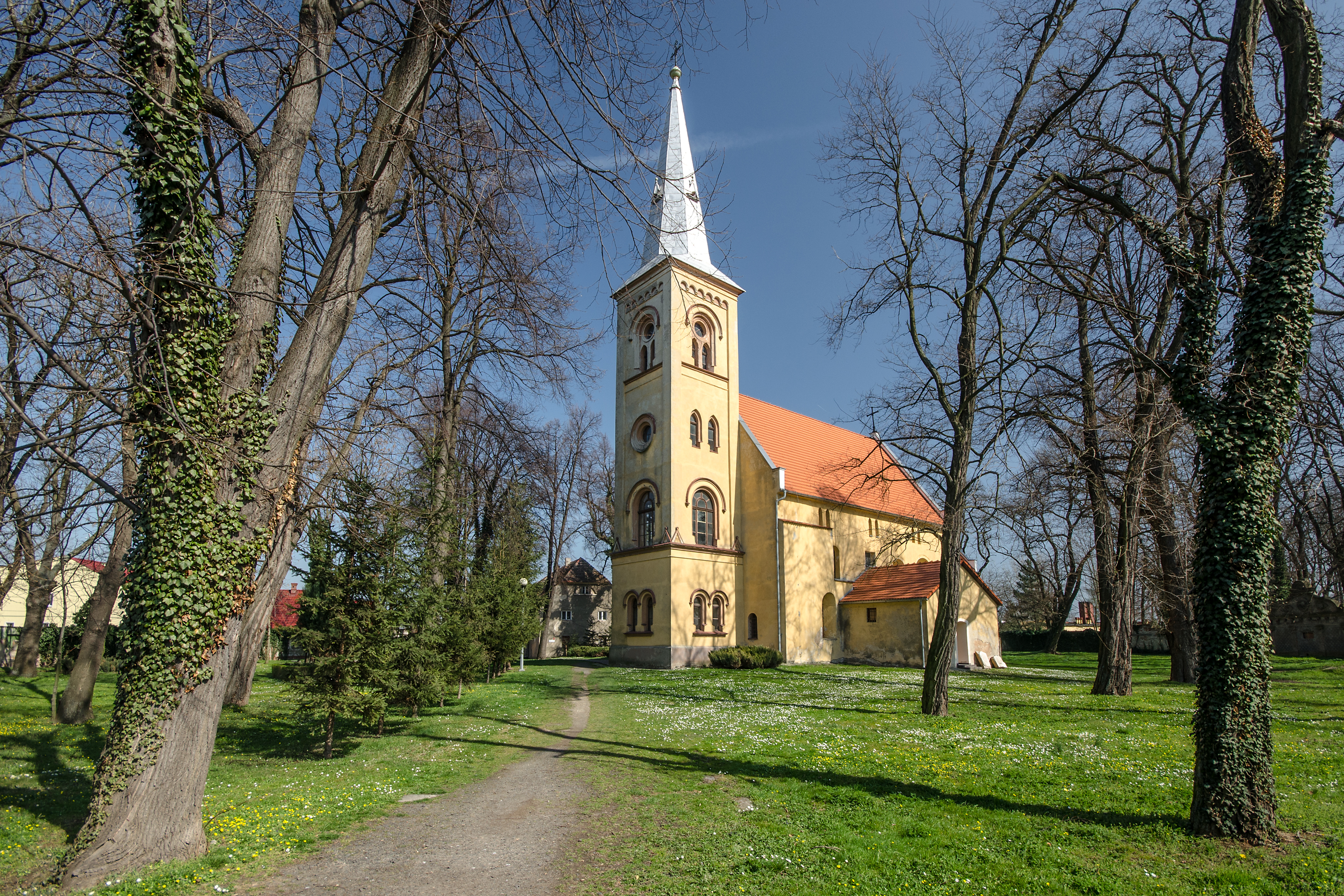
- Church of Our Lady of the Rosary

- Location within Poland
- Coordinates: 51°7′N 16°20′E
- Country: Poland
- Voivodeship: Lower Silesian
- Powiat: Jawor
- Gmina: Wądroże Wielkie

Population
  - Total: 620
- Website: http://wadrozewielkie.eu

Wądroże Wielkie [vɔnˈdrɔʐɛ ˈvjɛlkʲɛ] is a village in Jawor County, Lower Silesian Voivodeship, in south-western Poland. It is the seat of the administrative district (gmina) called Gmina Wądroże Wielkie.
