= Gmina Legnickie Pole =

Gmina Legnickie Pole Gemeinde Wahlstatt Legnickie Pole Commune
- Gmina
- Flag Coat of arms
- Interactive map of Gmina Legnickie Pole; Gemeinde Wahlstatt
- Coordinates (Legnickie Pole): 51°9′N 16°15′E
- Country: Poland
- Voivodeship: Lower Silesian
- County: Legnica County
- Seat: Legnickie Pole
- Sołectwos: Bartoszów, Biskupice, Czarnków, Gniewomierz, Kłębanowice, Koiszków, Koskowice, Księginice, Legnickie Pole, Lubień, Mikołajowice, Nowa Wieś Legnicka, Ogonowice, Raczkowa, Strachowice, Taczalin

Area
  - Total: 85.37 km^{2} (32.96 sq mi)

Population (2019-06-30)
  - Total: 5,233
  - Density: 61.30/km^{2} (158.8/sq mi)
- Website: http://www.legnickiepole.pl/

Gmina Legnickie Pole (German:Wahlstatt Gemeinde) is a rural gmina (administrative district) in Legnica County, Lower Silesian Voivodeship, in south-western Poland. Its seat is the village of Legnickie Pole, which lies approximately 10 kilometres (6 mi) south-east of Legnica, and 56 kilometres (35 mi) west of the regional capital Wrocław.

The gmina covers an area of 85.37 square kilometres (33.0 sq mi), and as of 2019 its total population is 5,233.

== Neighbouring gminas ==
Gmina Legnickie Pole is bordered by the town of Legnica and the gminas of Krotoszyce, Kunice, Męcinka, Mściwojów, Ruja and Wądroże Wielkie.

== Villages ==
The gmina contains the villages of Bartoszów, Biskupice, Czarnków, Gniewomierz, Kłębanowice, Koiszków, Koskowice, Księginice, Legnickie Pole, Lubień, Mąkolice, Mikołajowice, Nowa Wieś Legnicka, Ogonowice, Psary, Raczkowa, Strachowice and Taczalin.
