= Marcinowice, Jawor County =

Marcinowice
- Village
- Location within Poland
- Coordinates: 50°52′44″N 16°34′55″E
- Country: Poland
- Voivodeship: Lower Silesian
- Powiat: Jawor
- Gmina: Mściwojów
- Time zone: UTC+1 (CET)
  - Summer (DST): UTC+2 (CEST)
- Vehicle registration: DJA

Marcinowice [mart͡ɕinɔˈvit͡sɛ] (German: Merzdorf) is a village in the administrative district of Gmina Mściwojów, within Jawor County, Lower Silesian Voivodeship, in south-western Poland.
