= Mikołajowice, Lower Silesian Voivodeship =

Mikołajowice
- Village
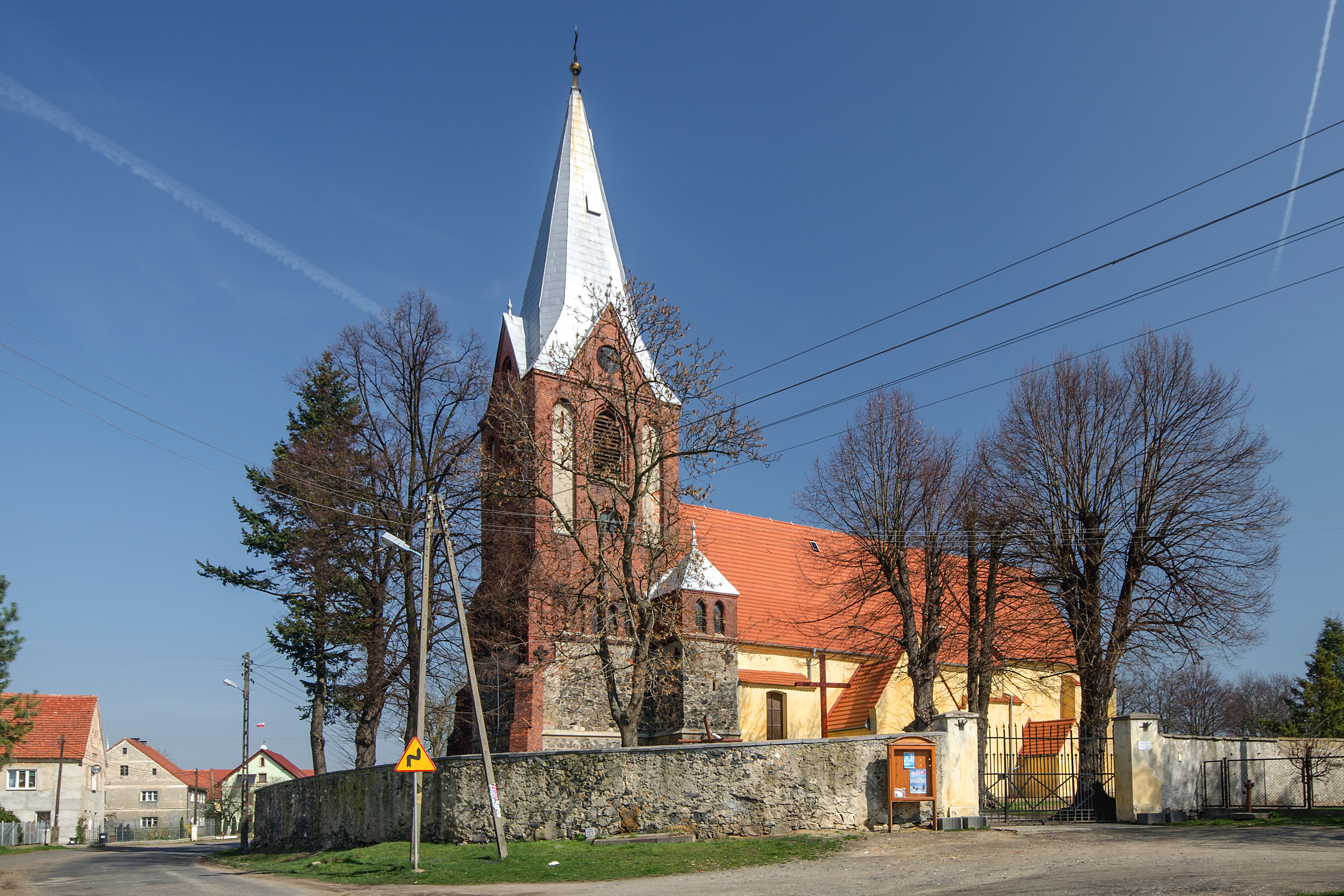
- Church of Our Lady of Częstochowa

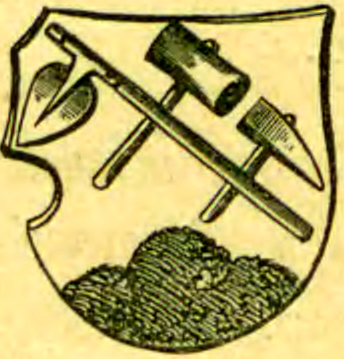
- Coat of arms

- Location within Poland
- Coordinates: 51°8′N 16°17′E
- Country: Poland
- Voivodeship: Lower Silesian
- County: Legnica
- Gmina: Legnickie Pole

Mikołajowice [mikɔwajɔˈvit͡sɛ] is a village in the administrative district of Gmina Legnickie Pole, within Legnica County, Lower Silesian Voivodeship, in south-western Poland.

== Notable residents ==
- Wilhelm Iwan (1871-1958), from 1911 to 1939 local Lutheran pastor
