= Taczalin =

- Village
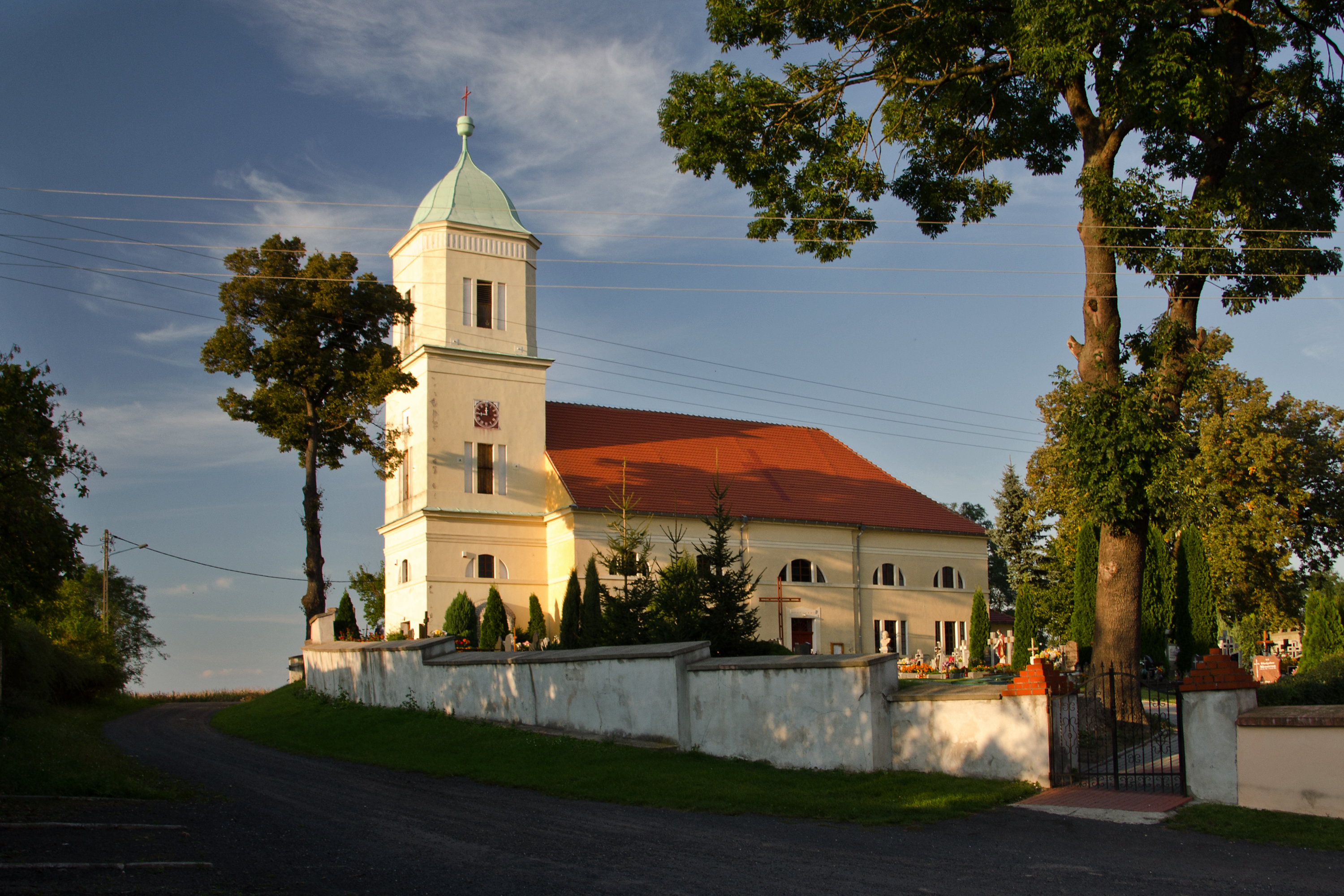
- Catholic church

- Location within Poland
- Coordinates: 51°9′N 16°18′E
- Country: Poland
- Voivodeship: Lower Silesian
- County: Legnica
- Gmina: Legnickie Pole

Taczalin [taˈt͡ʂalin] is a village in the administrative district of Gmina Legnickie Pole, within Legnica County, Lower Silesian Voivodeship, in south-western Poland.
