= Gniewomierz =

- Village
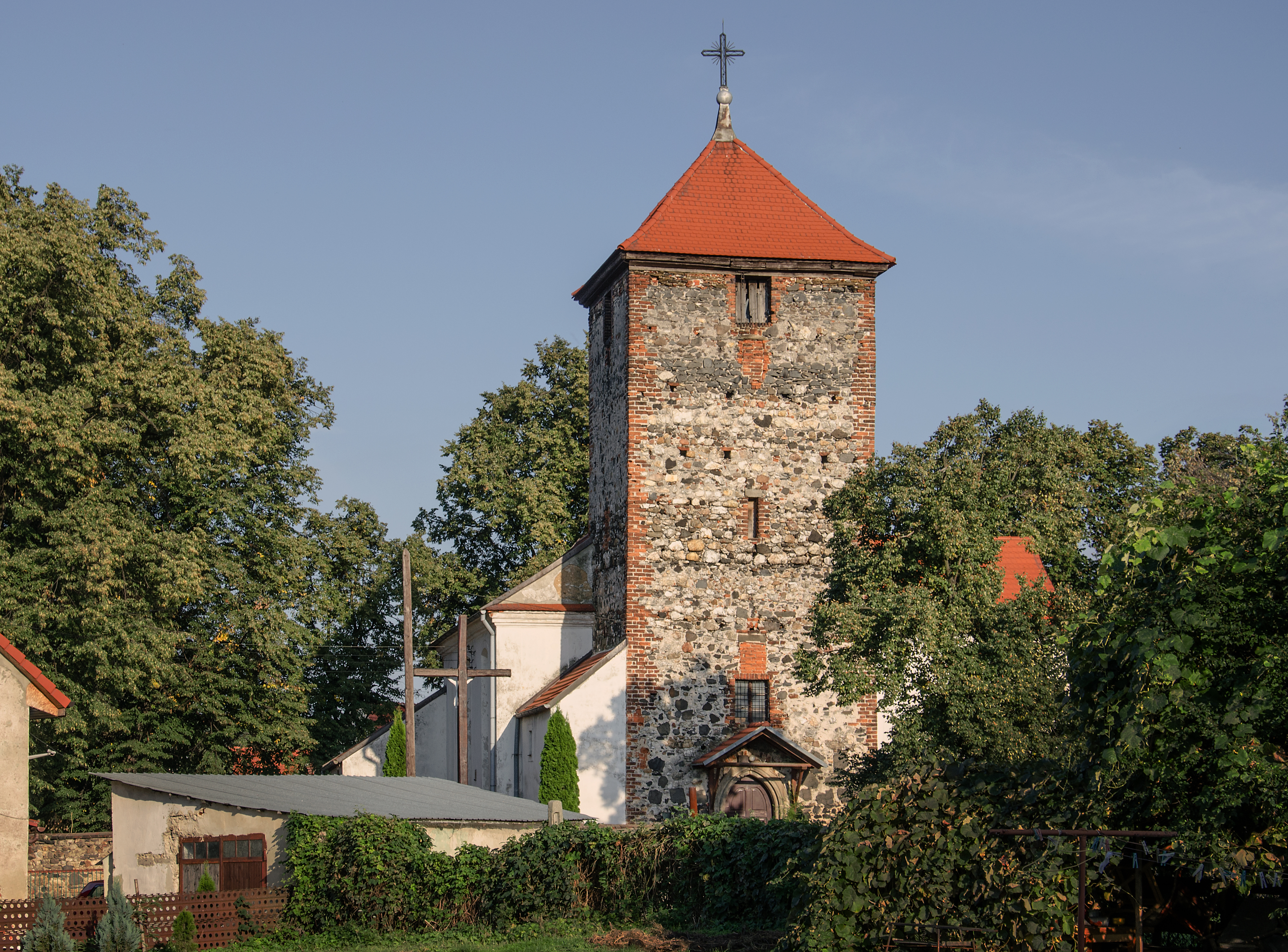
- Catholic church

- Location within Poland
- Coordinates: 51°09′39″N 16°13′04″E
- Country: Poland
- Voivodeship: Lower Silesian
- County: Legnica
- Gmina: Legnickie Pole
- Population: 540

Gniewomierz [ɡɲɛˈvɔmjɛʂ] is a village in the administrative district of Gmina Legnickie Pole, within Legnica County, Lower Silesian Voivodeship, in south-western Poland.
