= Bartoszów =

- Village
- Location within Poland
- Coordinates: 51°11′13″N 16°12′41″E
- Country: Poland
- Voivodeship: Lower Silesian
- County: Legnica
- Gmina: Legnickie Pole

Bartoszów [barˈtɔʂuf] is a village in the administrative district of Gmina Legnickie Pole, within Legnica County, Lower Silesian Voivodeship, in south-western Poland.
