= Biskupice, Legnica County =

Biskupice
- Village
- Location within Poland
- Coordinates: 51°08′06″N 16°12′55″E
- Country: Poland
- Voivodeship: Lower Silesian
- County: Legnica
- Gmina: Legnickie Pole

Biskupice [biskuˈpit͡sɛ] is a village in the administrative district of Gmina Legnickie Pole, within Legnica County, Lower Silesian Voivodeship, in south-western Poland.
