= Koiszków =

Koiszków Koischkau (German)
- Village
- Location within Poland
- Coordinates: 51°08′21″N 16°10′07″E
- Country: Poland
- Voivodeship: Lower Silesian
- County: Legnica
- Gmina: Legnickie Pole

Population
  - Total: 65

Koiszków [ˈkɔi̯ʂkuf] is a village in the administrative district of Gmina Legnickie Pole, within Legnica County, Lower Silesian Voivodeship, in south-western Poland.
