= Koskowice =

- Village
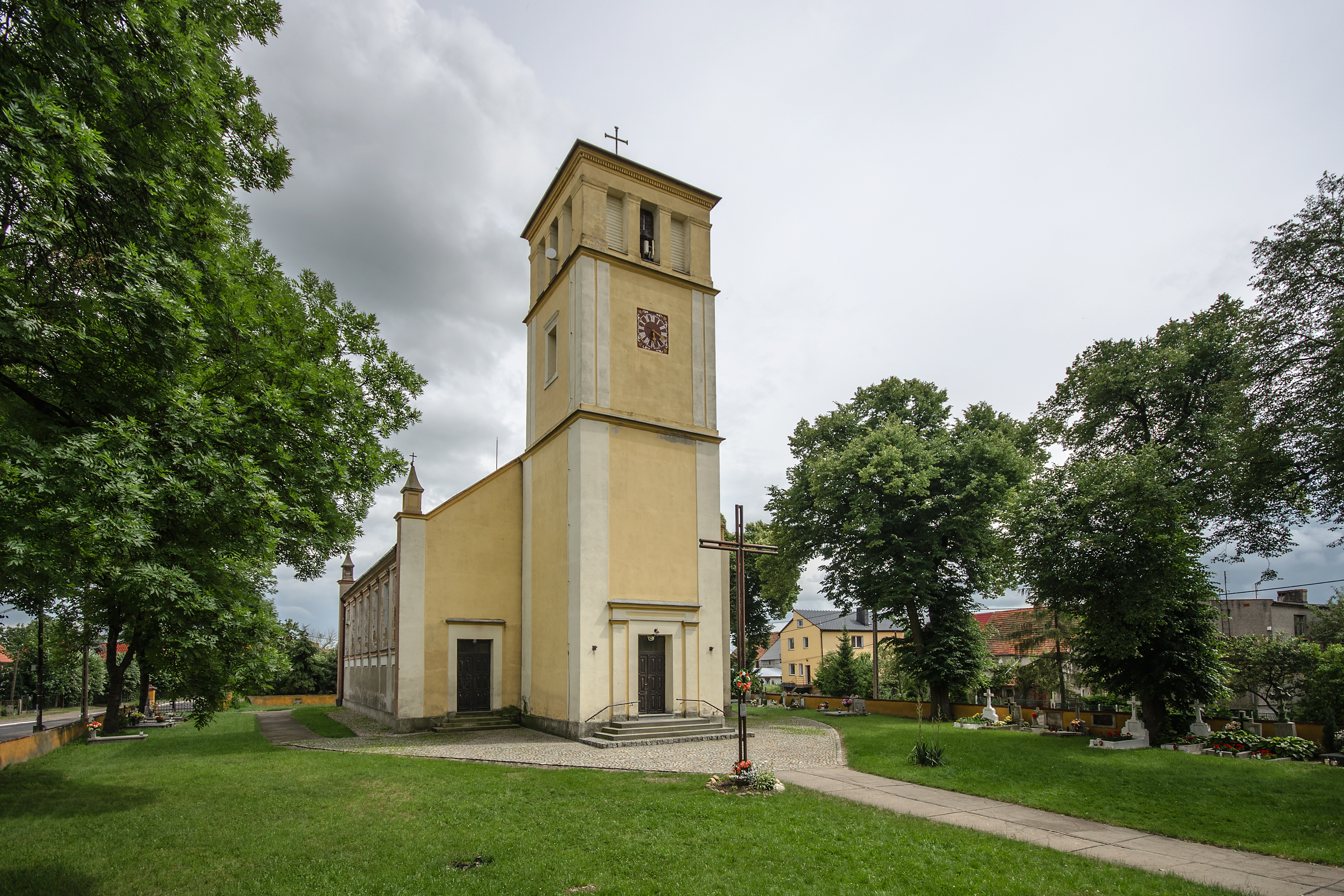
- Catholic church

- Location within Poland
- Coordinates: 51°11′05″N 16°14′41″E
- Country: Poland
- Voivodeship: Lower Silesian
- County: Legnica
- Gmina: Legnickie Pole
- Population: 360

Koskowice [kɔskɔˈvit͡sɛ] is a village in the administrative district of Gmina Legnickie Pole, within Legnica County, Lower Silesian Voivodeship, in south-western Poland.

== Notable residents ==
- Daniel Czepko von Reigersfeld (1605–1660), German Lutheran poet and dramatist
