= Ogonowice, Lower Silesian Voivodeship =

Ogonowice
- Village
- Location within Poland
- Coordinates: 51°06′42″N 16°14′26″E
- Country: Poland
- Voivodeship: Lower Silesian
- County: Legnica
- Gmina: Legnickie Pole

Ogonowice [ɔɡɔnɔˈvit͡sɛ] is a village in the administrative district of Gmina Legnickie Pole, within Legnica County, Lower Silesian Voivodeship, in south-western Poland. Prior to 1945 it was known as Kaudewitz Germany.
