= Nowa Wieś Legnicka =

- Village
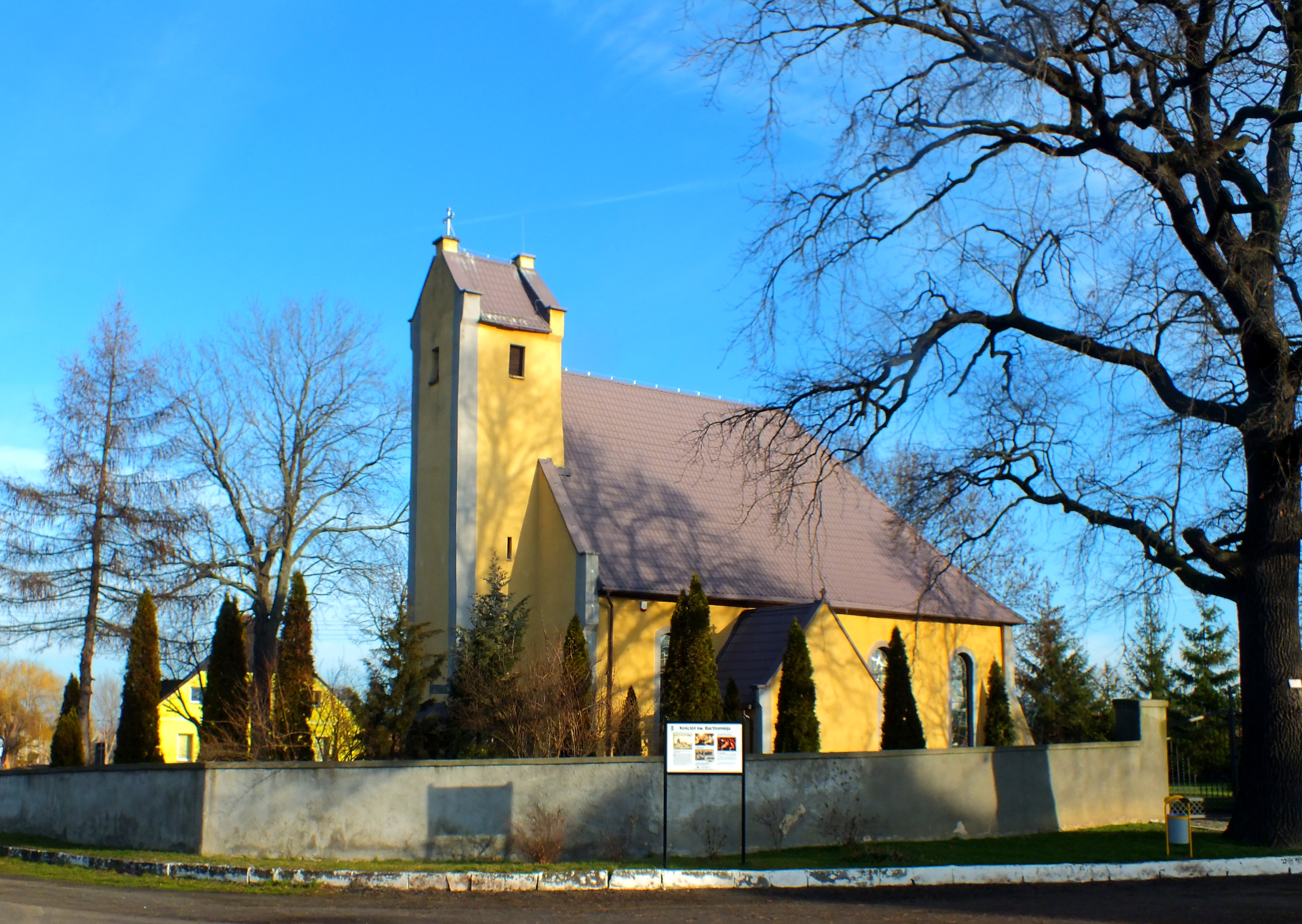
- Church of Saint Bartholomew

- Location within Poland
- Coordinates: 51°9′N 16°11′E
- Country: Poland
- Voivodeship: Lower Silesian
- County: Legnica
- Gmina: Legnickie Pole

Population
  - Total: 560

Nowa Wieś Legnicka [ˈnɔva ˈvjɛɕ lɛɡˈnit͡ska] is a village in the administrative district of Gmina Legnickie Pole, within Legnica County, Lower Silesian Voivodeship, in south-western Poland.
