= Grzegorzów, Jawor County =

Grzegorzów
- Village
- Location within Poland
- Coordinates: 51°03′28″N 16°14′13″E
- Country: Poland
- Voivodeship: Lower Silesian
- County: Jawor
- Gmina: Mściwojów
- Elevation: 196 m (643 ft)
- Population: 100
- Time zone: UTC+1 (CET)
  - Summer (DST): UTC+2 (CEST)
- Vehicle registration: DJA

Grzegorzów [ɡʐɛˈɡɔʐuf] is a village in the administrative district of Gmina Mściwojów, within Jawor County, Lower Silesian Voivodeship, in south-western Poland.
