= Strachowice, Legnica County =

Strachowice
- Village
- Location within Poland
- Coordinates: 51°7′N 16°16′E
- Country: Poland
- Voivodeship: Lower Silesian
- County: Legnica
- Gmina: Legnickie Pole
- Time zone: UTC+1 (CET)
  - Summer (DST): UTC+2 (CEST)
- Vehicle registration: DLE

Strachowice [straxɔˈvit͡sɛ] is a village in the administrative district of Gmina Legnickie Pole, within Legnica County, Lower Silesian Voivodeship, in south-western Poland.

From the Middle Ages, the area was part of Poland, and afterwards it was also part of Bohemia (Czechia), Prussia and Germany. In 1945 it became part of Poland again following World War II.
