= Gmina Mściwojów =

Gmina Mściwojów Mściwojów Commune
- Gmina
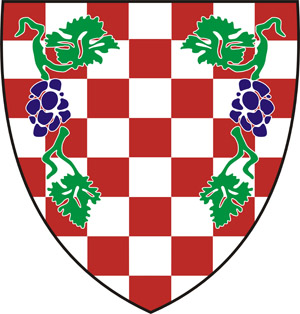
- Flag Coat of arms
- Interactive map of Gmina Mściwojów
- Coordinates (Mściwojów): 51°02′30″N 16°16′08″E
- Country: Poland
- Voivodeship: Lower Silesian
- County: Jawor
- Seat: Mściwojów
- Sołectwos: Barycz, Drzymałowice, Godziszowa, Grzegorzów, Luboradz, Marcinowice, Mściwojów, Niedaszów, Siekierzyce, Snowidza, Targoszyn, Zimnik

Area
  - Total: 71.83 km^{2} (27.73 sq mi)

Population (2019-06-30)
  - Total: 4,065
  - Density: 56.59/km^{2} (146.6/sq mi)
- Website: http://www.msciwojow.pl

Gmina Mściwojów is a rural gmina (administrative district) in Jawor County, Lower Silesian Voivodeship, in south-western Poland. Its seat is the village of Mściwojów, which lies approximately 7 kilometres (4.3 mi) east of Jawor and 55 km (34 mi) west of the regional capital Wrocław.

The gmina covers an area of 71.83 square kilometres (27.73 sq mi), and as of 2019, its total population is 4,065.

== Neighbouring gminas ==
Gmina Mściwojów is bordered by the town of Jawor and the gminas of Dobromierz, Legnickie Pole, Męcinka, Paszowice, Strzegom, Udanin and Wądroże Wielkie.

== Villages ==
The gmina contains the villages of Barycz, Drzymałowice, Godziszowa, Grzegorzów, Luboradz, Marcinowice, Mściwojów, Niedaszów, Siekierzyce, Snowidza, Targoszyn and Zimnik.

== Twin towns – sister cities ==
Gmina Mściwojów is twinned with:

- Jiřetín pod Bukovou, Czech Republic
- Profen (Elsteraue), Germany
