= Czarnków, Lower Silesian Voivodeship =

Czarnków
- Village
- Location within Poland
- Coordinates: 51°07′21″N 16°12′20″E
- Country: Poland
- Voivodeship: Lower Silesian
- County: Legnica
- Gmina: Legnickie Pole

Czarnków [ˈt͡ʂarnkuf] is a village in the administrative district of Gmina Legnickie Pole, within Legnica County, Lower Silesian Voivodeship, in southwestern Poland.
