= Kłębanowice, Legnica County =

Kłębanowice
- Village (Wieś)
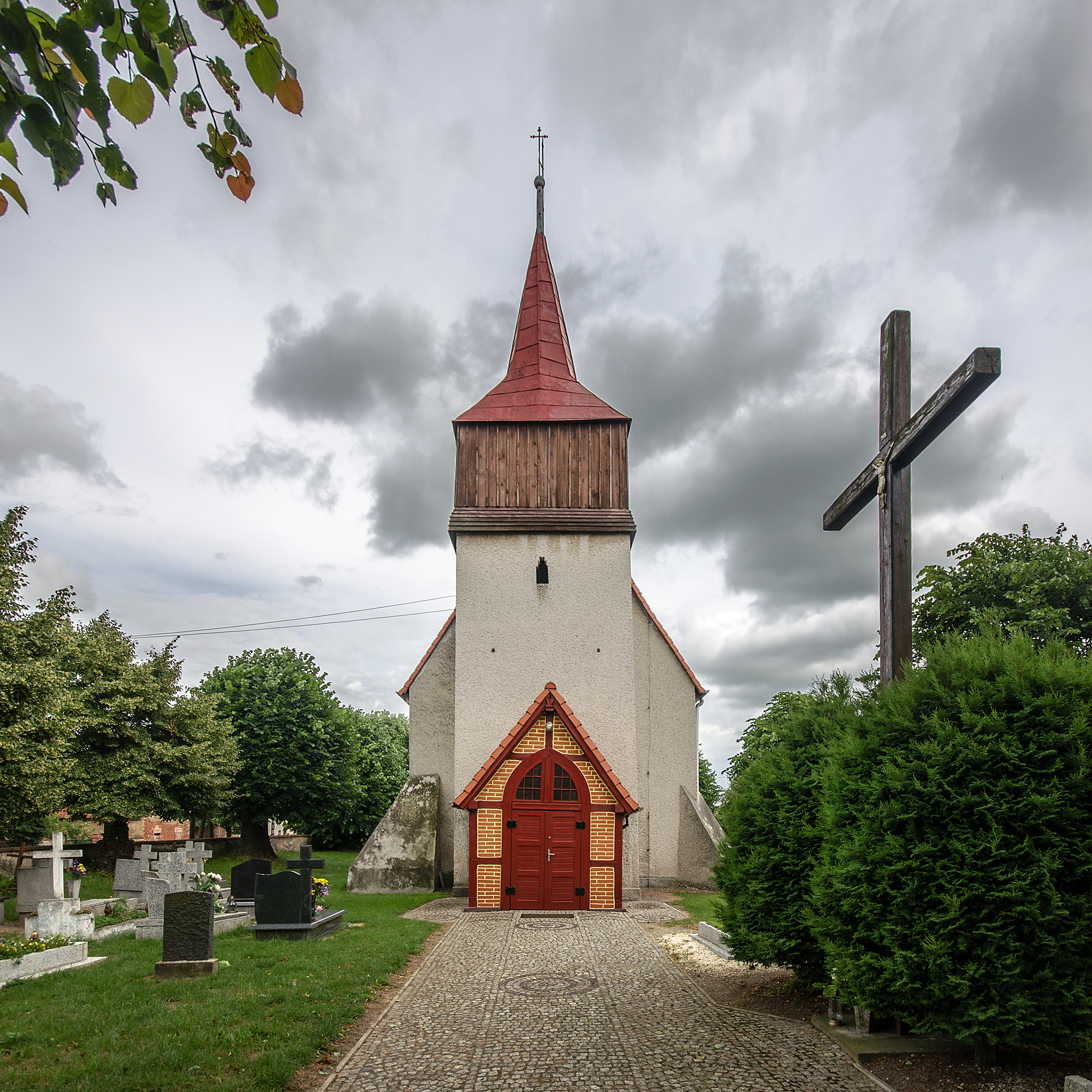
- Saint Hedwig church in Kłębanowice

- Location within Poland
- Coordinates: 51°10′51″N 16°16′44″E
- Country: Poland
- Voivodeship: Lower Silesian
- County: Legnica
- Gmina: Legnickie Pole

Kłębanowice [kwɛmbanɔˈvit͡sɛ] is a village located in Legnica County Gmina Legnickie Pole, Lower Silesian Voivodeship, in south-western Poland.
