= Gmina Wądroże Wielkie =

Gmina Wądroże Wielkie Wądroże Wielkie Commune
- Gmina
- Flag Coat of arms
- Interactive map of Gmina Wądroże Wielkie
- Coordinates (Wądroże Wielkie): 51°7′N 16°20′E
- Country: Poland
- Voivodeship: Lower Silesian
- County: Jawor County
- Seat: Wądroże Wielkie
- Sołectwos: Bielany, Biernatki, Budziszów Mały, Budziszów Wielki, Gądków, Granowice, Jenków, Kępy, Kosiska, Mierczyce, Pawłowice Wielkie, Postolice, Rąbienice, Skała, Sobolew, Wądroże Małe, Wądroże Wielkie, Wierzchowice

Area
  - Total: 89.15 km^{2} (34.42 sq mi)

Population (2019-06-30)
  - Total: 3,931
  - Density: 44.09/km^{2} (114.2/sq mi)
- Website: http://www.wadrozewielkie.pl/

Gmina Wądroże Wielkie is a rural gmina (administrative district) in Jawor County, Lower Silesian Voivodeship, in south-western Poland. Its seat is the village of Wądroże Wielkie, which lies approximately 13 km (8.1 mi) north-east of Jawor and 50 km (31 mi) west of the regional capital Wrocław.

The gmina covers an area of 89.15 square kilometres (34.42 sq mi), and as of 2019 its total population was 3,931.

== Neighbouring gminas ==
Gmina Wądroże Wielkie is bordered by the gminas of Legnickie Pole, Malczyce, Mściwojów, Ruja, Środa Śląska and Udanin.

== Villages ==
The gmina contains the villages of Augustów, Bielany, Biernatki, Budziszów Mały, Budziszów Wielki, Dobrzany, Gądków, Granowice, Jenków, Kępy, Kosiska, Mierczyce, Pawłowice Wielkie, Postolice, Rąbienice, Skała, Sobolew, Wądroże Małe, Wądroże Wielkie and Wierzchowice.
