= Lubień, Lower Silesian Voivodeship =

Lubień
- Village
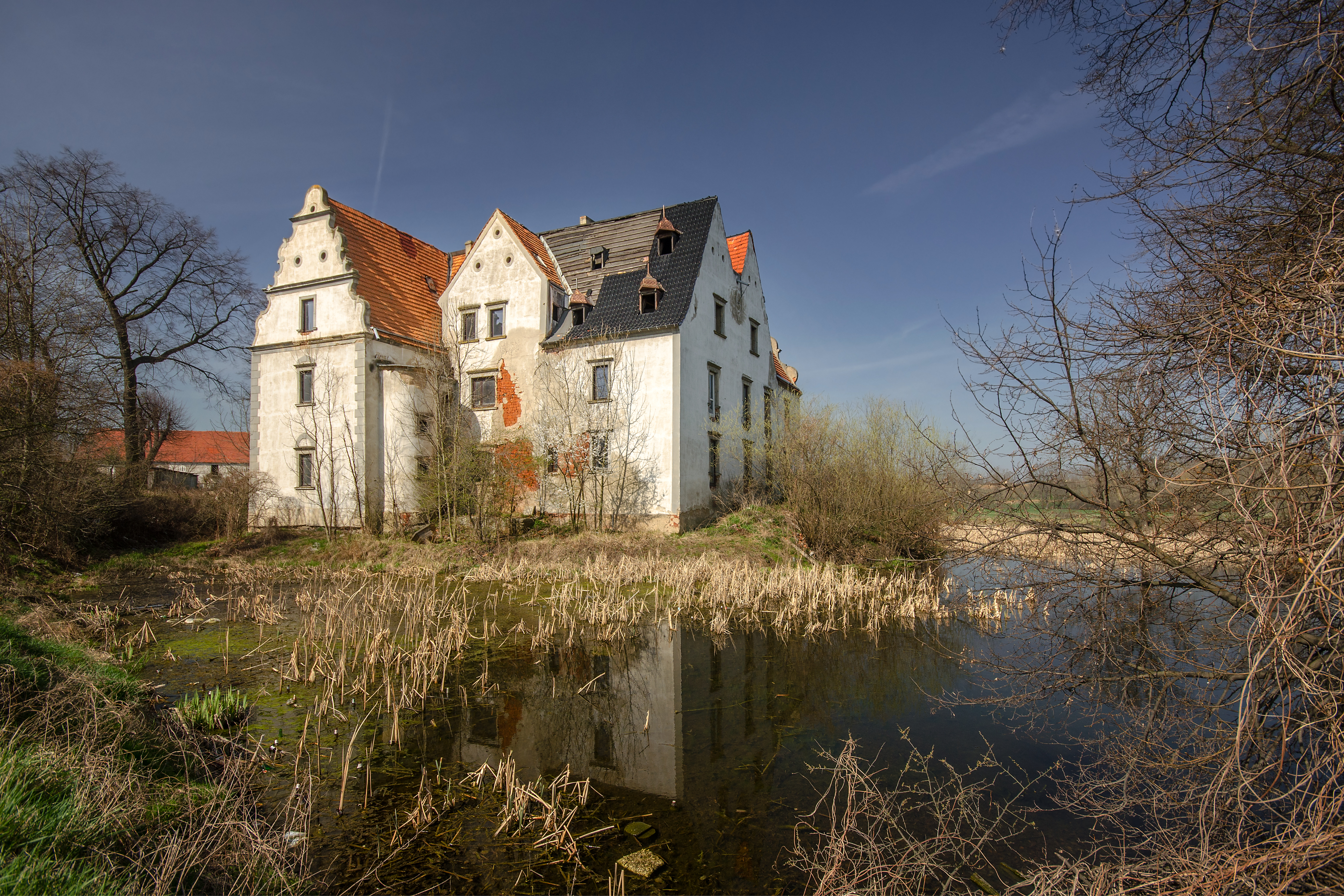
- Renaissance castle of the Counts of Schweinitz

- Location within Poland
- Coordinates: 51°7′N 16°14′E
- Country: Poland
- Voivodeship: Lower Silesian
- County: Legnica
- Gmina: Legnickie Pole

Lubień (Polish pronunciation: [ˈlubjɛj̃]) is a village in the administrative district of Gmina Legnickie Pole, within Legnica County, Lower Silesian Voivodeship, in south-western Poland.
