= Mąkolice, Lower Silesian Voivodeship =

Mąkolice
- Village
- Location within Poland
- Coordinates: 51°07′46″N 16°10′51″E
- Country: Poland
- Voivodeship: Lower Silesian
- County: Legnica
- Gmina: Legnickie Pole
- Population: 50

Mąkolice [mɔŋkɔˈlit͡sɛ] is a village in the administrative district of Gmina Legnickie Pole, within Legnica County, Lower Silesian Voivodeship, in south-western Poland.
