= Lubień, Greater Poland Voivodeship =

Lubień
- Village
- Location within Poland
- Coordinates: 52°24′6″N 15°58′48″E
- Country: Poland
- Voivodeship: Greater Poland
- County: Nowy Tomyśl
- Gmina: Miedzichowo

Lubień (Polish pronunciation: [ˈlubjɛj̃]) is a village in the administrative district of Gmina Miedzichowo, within Nowy Tomyśl County, Greater Poland Voivodeship, in west-central Poland.
