= Legnica Voivodeship =

Former administrative division of Poland

Coordinates: 51°12′30″N 16°09′37″E

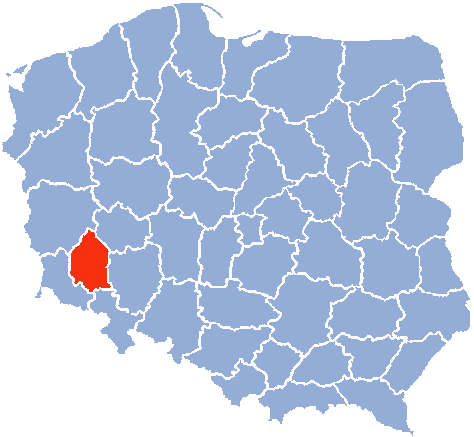
Legnica Voivodeship

Legnica Voivodeship (Polish: województwo legnickie) was a unit of administrative division and local government in Poland in the years 1975–1998, superseded by Lower Silesian Voivodeship. Its capital city was Legnica.

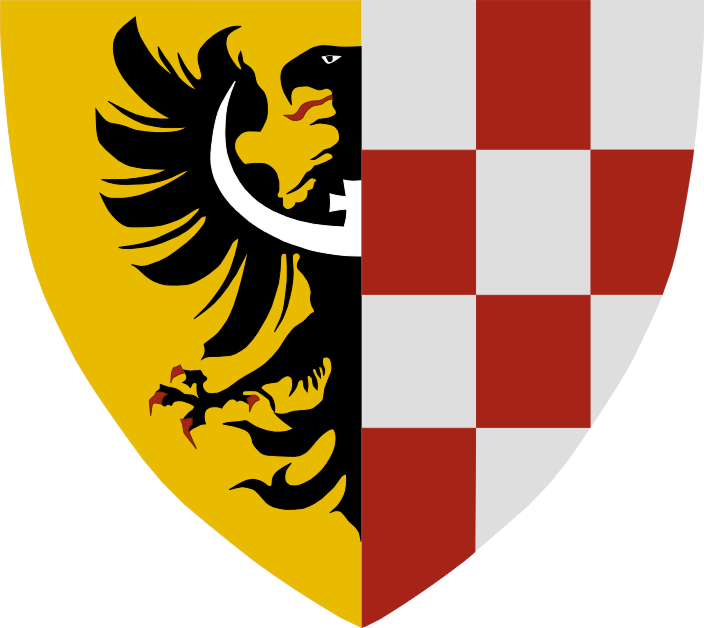
Coat of Arms of the Legnica Voivodeship

== Major cities and towns (population in 1995) ==
- Legnica (108,000)
- Lubin (83,500)
- Głogów (74,200)
- Jawor (25,600)
- Polkowice (21,600)

== See also ==
- Voivodeships of Poland
