= Jawor County =

Coordinates: 51°03′N 16°11′E

Jawor County Powiat jaworski
- County
- Flag Coat of arms

- Location within the voivodeship
- Country: Poland
- Voivodeship: Lower Silesian
- Seat: Jawor
- Gminas: Total 6 (incl. 1 urban): Jawor; Gmina Bolków; Gmina Męcinka; Gmina Mściwojów; Gmina Paszowice; Gmina Wądroże Wielkie

Area
  - Total: 581.25 km^{2} (224.42 sq mi)

Population (2019-06-30)
  - Total: 50,315
  - Density: 86.563/km^{2} (224.20/sq mi)
  - Urban: 27,880
  - Rural: 22,435
- Time zone: UTC+1 (CET)
  - Summer (DST): UTC+2 (CEST)
- Car plates: DJA
- Website: www.powiat-jawor.org.pl

Jawor County (Polish: powiat jaworski) is a unit of territorial administration and local government (powiat) in Lower Silesian Voivodeship, south-western Poland. It came into being on January 1, 1999, as a result of the Polish local government reforms passed in 1998. The county covers an area of 581.2 square kilometres (224.4 sq mi). Its administrative seat is the town of Jawor; the only other town in the county is Bolków.

As of 2019 the total population of the county is 50,315, out of which the population of Jawor is 22,890, the population of Bolków is 4,990, and the rural population is 22,435.

== Neighbouring counties ==
Jawor County is bordered by Legnica County to the north, Środa County to the east, Świdnica County to the south-east, Wałbrzych County and Kamienna Góra County to the south, and Karkonosze County and Złotoryja County to the west.

== Administrative divisions ==
The county is subdivided into six gminas (one urban, one urban-rural and four rural). These are listed in the following table, in descending order of population.

Gmina	Type	Area (km^{2})	Population (2019)	Seat
Jawor	urban	18.8	22,890	
Gmina Bolków	urban-rural	152.9	10,458	Bolków
Gmina Męcinka	rural	147.8	4,995	Męcinka
Gmina Mściwojów	rural	71.8	4,065	Mściwojów
Gmina Paszowice	rural	100.8	3,976	Paszowice
Gmina Wądroże Wielkie	rural	89.2	3,931	Wądroże Wielkie
