= Konrad Wytrychowski =

Polish judge and legal scholar (born 1976)

The Honourable Konrad Wytrychowski

Justice of the Supreme Court of Poland
- In office 19 September 2018 – 23 July 2022
- Appointed by: Andrzej Duda
- Succeeded by: Seat abolished

President of the Court of Appeal in Wrocław
- In office 19 December 2017 – 20 September 2018
- Preceded by: Grazyna Szyburska-Walczak
- Succeeded by: Jan Gibiec (acting)

Personal details
- Born: 11 May 1976 (age 50) Legnica, Polish People's Republic
- Education: University of Wroclaw (LL.M, JSD)

Konrad Kamil Wytrychowski (born 11 May 1976) is a Polish lawyer and jurist. He served as a justice of the Supreme Court of Poland from 2018 to 2022. He also served as president of the Court of Appeal in Wrocław from 2017 to 2018. He retired from the high court in 2022.

== Early life and education ==
Wytrychowski was born on 11 May, 1976, in Legnica, Lower Silesia, Poland. He attended the University of Wroclaw and graduated from the Faculty of Law and Administration with a Master of Laws in 2000.

From 2001 to 2003, he completed judicial training within the jurisdiction of the Regional Court in Legnica. In April 2003, he passed the judicial examination with honours.

He later pursued doctoral studies at the University of Wroclaw and received a doctorate in jurisprudence in 2006. His dissertation, Funkcja zgody pokrzywdzonego w polskim prawie karnym (The Function of the Victim's Consent in Polish Criminal Law), examined role of plaintiff consent in Polish criminal civil law.

== Juridical career ==
Wytrychowski began his judicial career on 21 July 2003, when he was appointed a judicial assessor at the District Court in Legnica. He initially worked in the court's commercial division before transferring to its criminal division in later November of 2005.

On 1 February 2007, Wytrychowski was appointed a judge of the District Court in Legnica. He became chair of the court's Second Criminal Division on September 1, 2008. Between 2009 and 2012, he was also periodically assigned to hear cases in the Third Criminal Division of the Regional Court in Legnica.

On 1 June 2016, Wytrychowski was appointed vice president of the District Court in Legnica.

On 18 November 2016, the National Council of the Judiciary recommended his appointment to the Regional Court in Legnica to the President of Poland. He was appointed to the Regional Court on March 23, 2017.

Later that year, Wytrychowski was appointed the chief justice of the appellate court in Wroclaw. He took office on December 19, 2017, and remained in the position until September 20, 2018.

== Supreme Court of Poland ==
On September 19, 2018, President Andrzej Duda appointed Wytrychowski to the Supreme Court of Poland, where he was assigned to the Polish Supreme Court Disciplinary Chamber. He served on the high court until July 23, 2022, when he retired from active judicial service, after legislative restructuring of the Polish Supreme Court.

Since retiring from judicial service, Wytrychowski has remained active in academia, foreign policy, and politics.

== See also ==
- Polish constitutional crisis
