= Legnica =

City in Lower Silesian Voivodeship, Poland

- City county
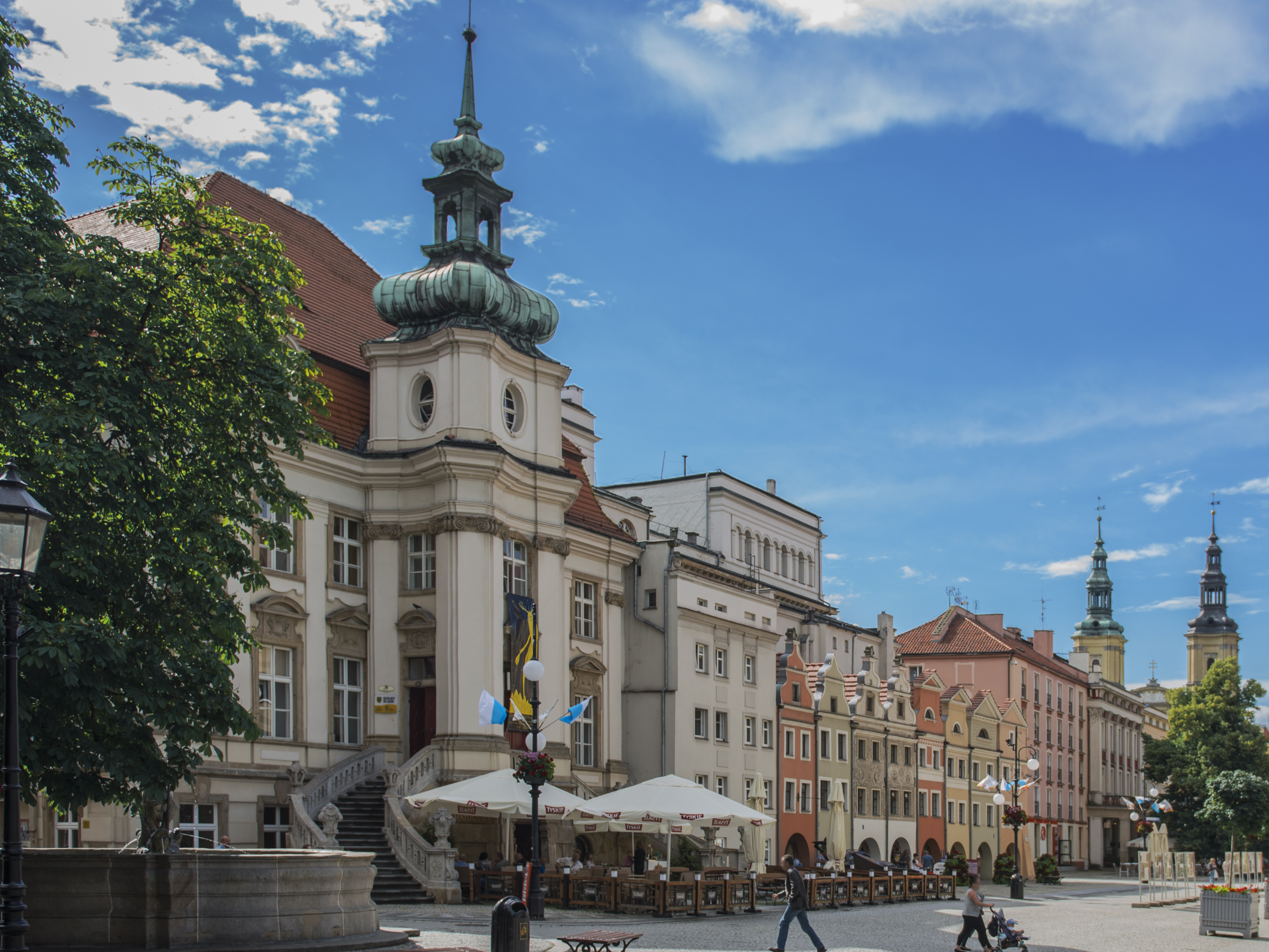
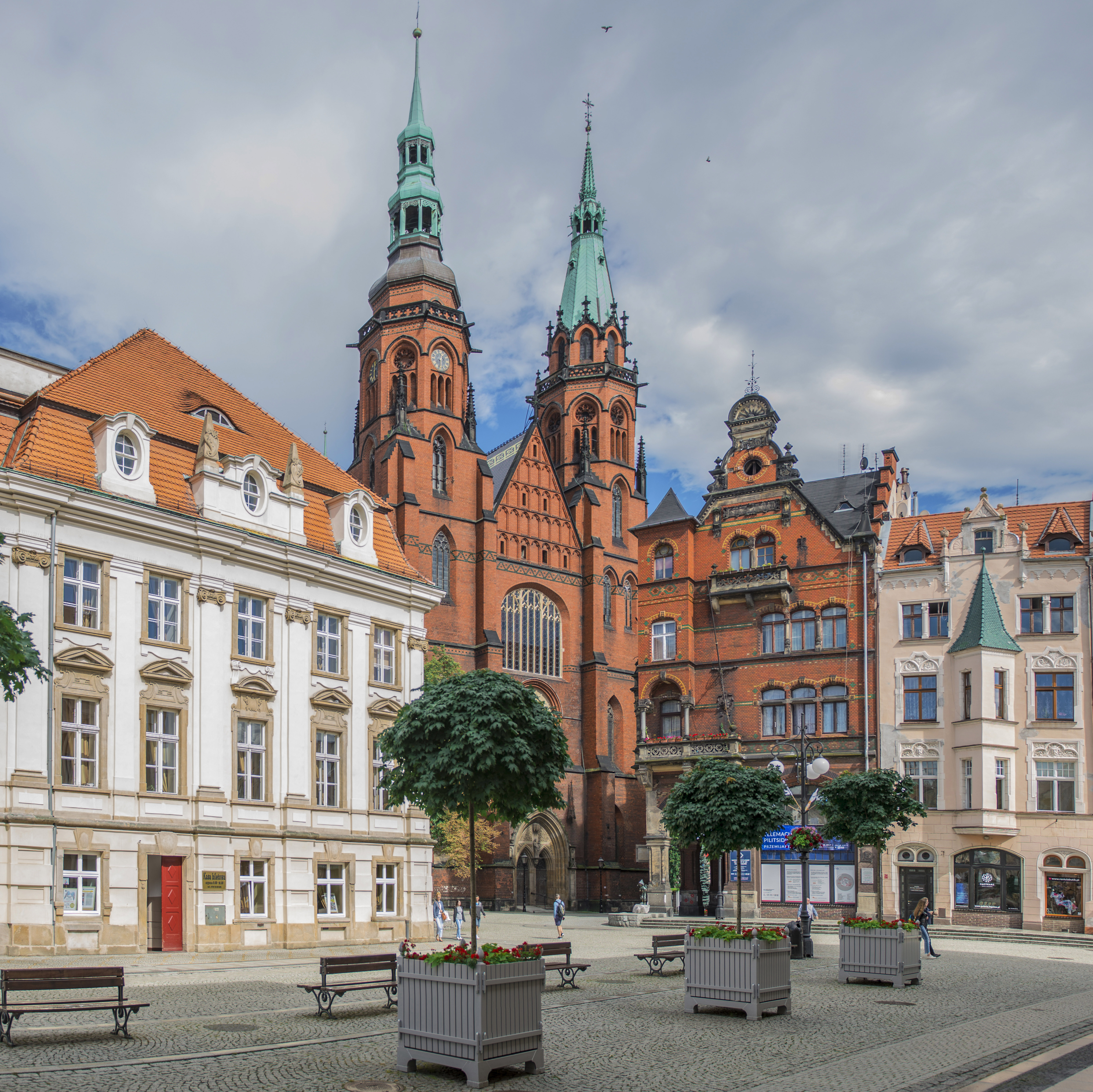
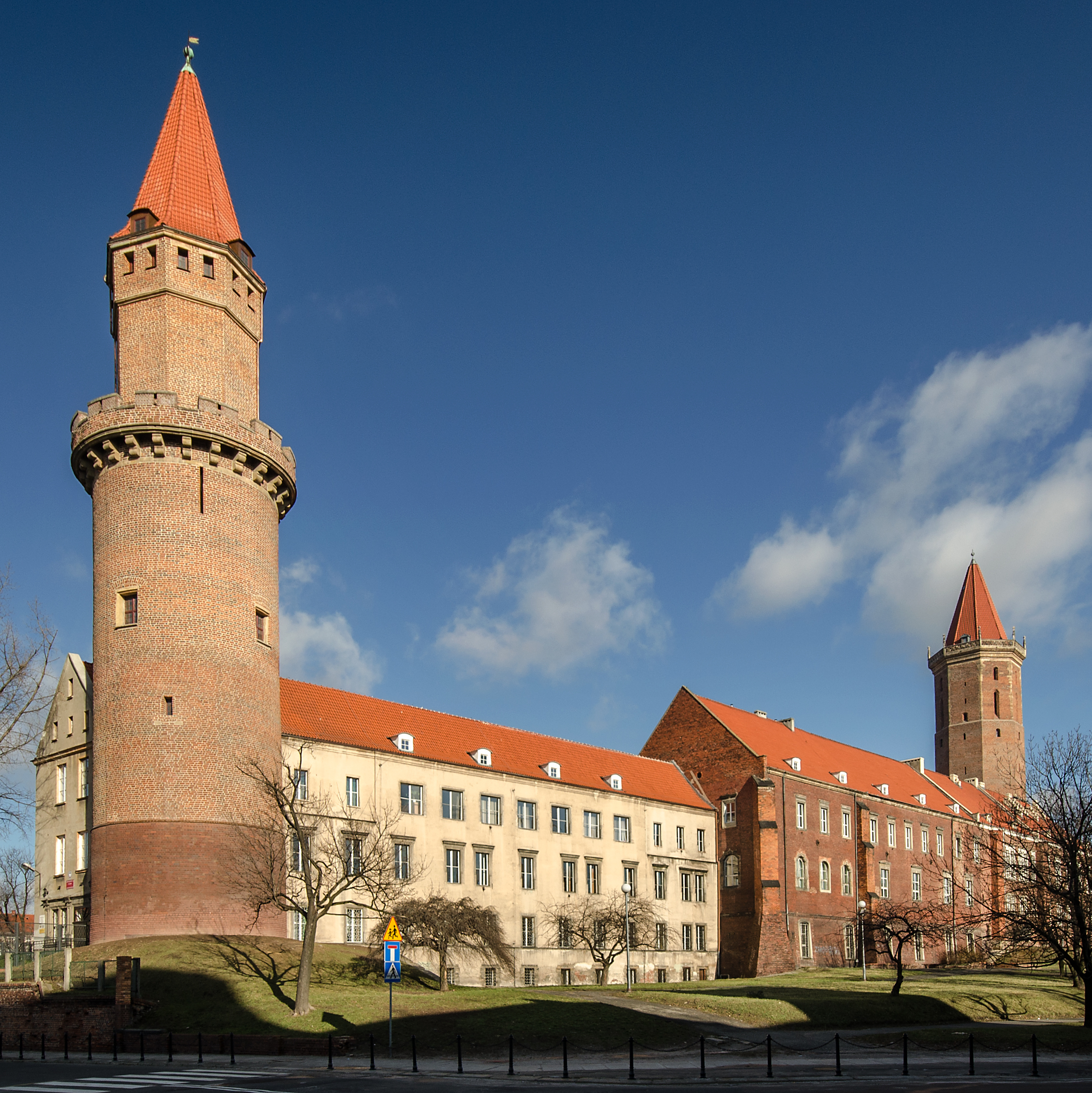
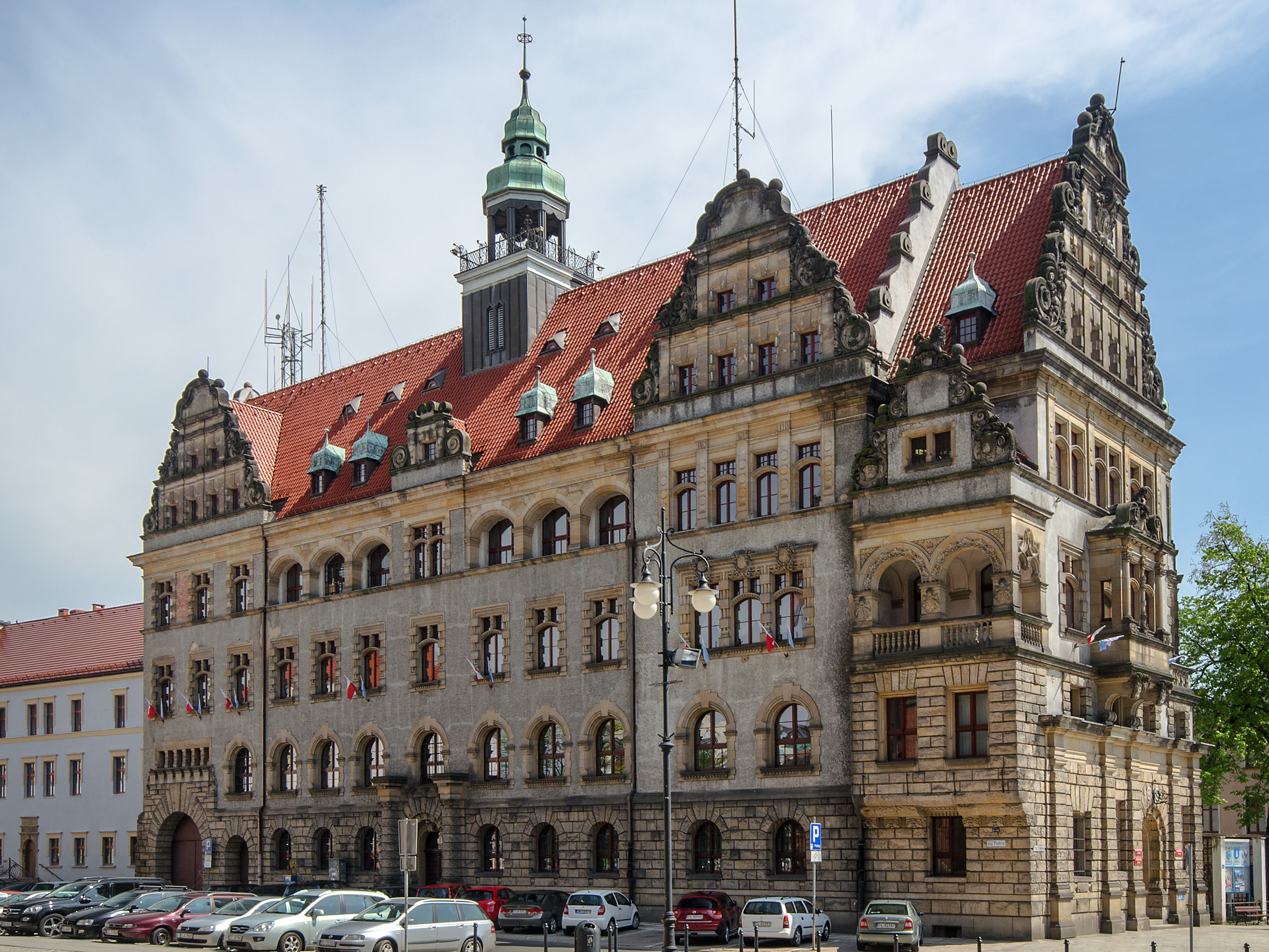
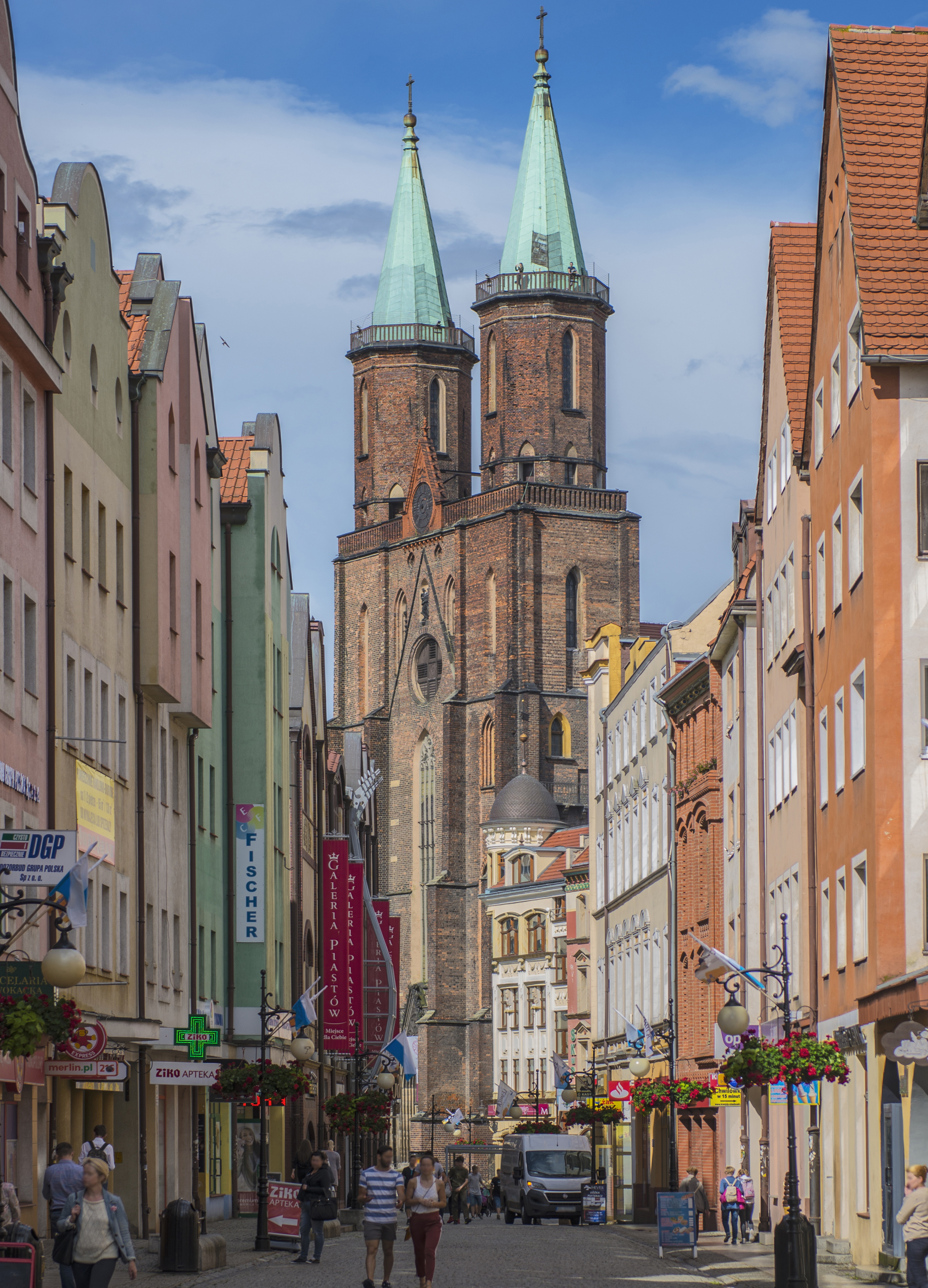
- Market Square and Baroque Old Town Hall Legnica Cathedral Piast Castle New City Hall Saint Mary church

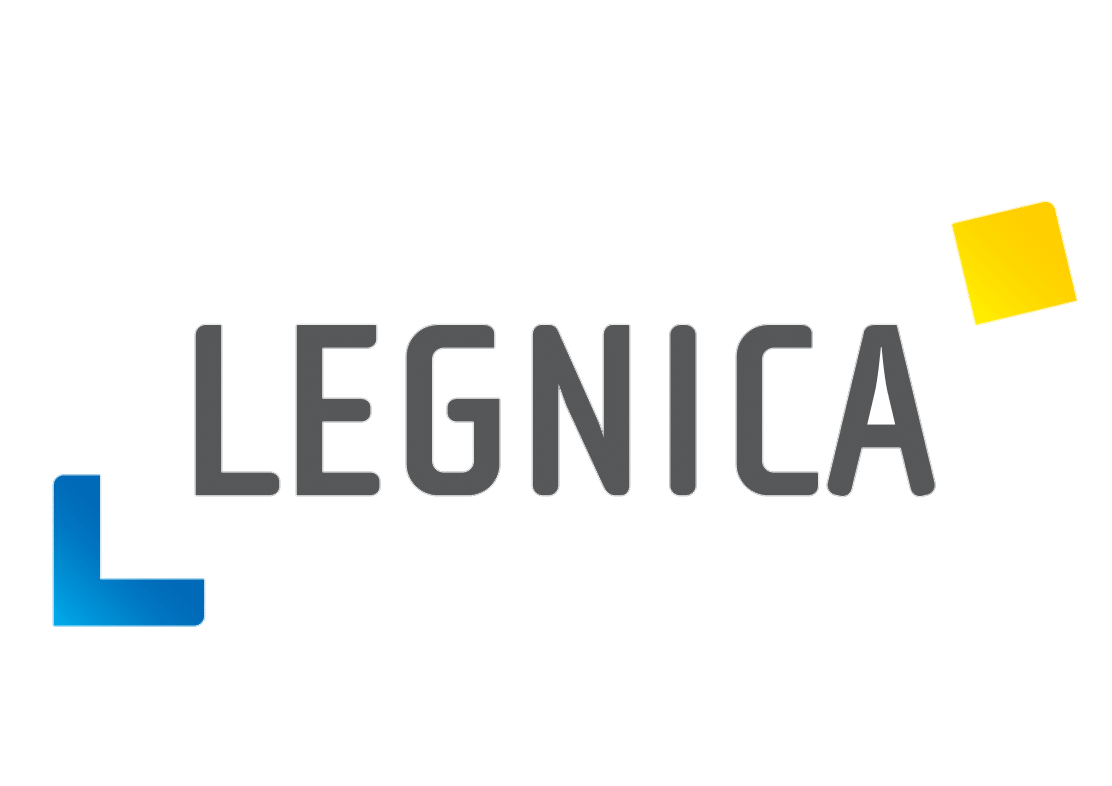
- Flag Coat of arms Wordmark

- Location within Poland
- Coordinates: 51°12′30″N 16°9′37″E
- Country: Poland
- Voivodeship: Lower Silesian
- County: city county
- First mentioned: 1004
- City rights: 1264

Government
  - City mayor: Maciej Kupaj (KO)

Area
  - Total: 56.29 km^{2} (21.73 sq mi)
- Elevation: 113 m (371 ft)

Population (31 December 2021)
  - Total: 97,300 ▼ (39th)
  - Density: 1,765/km^{2} (4,570/sq mi)
- Time zone: UTC+1 (CET)
  - Summer (DST): UTC+2 (CEST)
- Postal code: 59-200 to 59-220
- Area code: +48 76
- Car plates: DL
- Website: www.legnica.um.gov.pl

Legnica (Polish: [lɛɡˈɲit͡sa]; German: Liegnitz, [ˈliːɡnɪts]; Czech: Lehnice) is a city in southwestern Poland, in the central part of Lower Silesia, on the Kaczawa River and the Czarna Woda. As well as being the seat of the county, since 1992 the city has been the seat of the Diocese of Legnica. As of 2023, Legnica had a population of 97,300 inhabitants.

The city was first referenced in chronicles dating from the year 1004, although previous settlements could be traced back to the 7th century. The name "Legnica" was mentioned in 1149 under High Duke of Poland Bolesław IV the Curly. Legnica was most likely the seat of Bolesław and it became the residence of the dukes of Legnica from 1248 until 1675. Legnica is a city over which the Piast dynasty reigned the longest, for about 700 years, from the time of ruler Mieszko I of Poland after the creation of the Polish state in the 10th century, until 1675 and the death of the last Piast duke George William. Legnica is one of the historical burial sites of Polish monarchs and consorts.

Legnica became renowned for the fierce battle that took place at Legnickie Pole near the city on 9 April 1241 during the first Mongol invasion of Poland, which ended in the defeat of the Polish-led Christian coalition by the Mongols. It is the westernmost battle by the Mongol Empire, although they did not occupy or annex the land.

Legnica is an economic, cultural and academic centre in Lower Silesia, together with Wrocław. The city is renowned for its varied architecture, spanning from early medieval to modern period, and its partially reconstructed Old Town with the Piast Castle, one of the largest in Poland. According to the Foreign direct investment ranking (FDI) from 2016, Legnica is one of the most progressive high-income cities in the Silesian region.

== Population ==
As of 31 December 2012 Legnica has 102,708 inhabitants and is the third largest city in the voivodeship (after Wrocław and Wałbrzych) and 38th in Poland. It also constitutes the southernmost and the largest urban center of a copper deposit (Legnicko-Głogowski Okręg Miedziowy) with agglomeration of 448,617 inhabitants. Legnica is the largest city of the conurbation and is a member of the Association of Polish Cities.

== History ==
=== Pre-history ===
Archaeological research conducted in eastern Legnica in the late 1970s, showed the existence of a bronze foundry and the graves of three metallurgists. The find indicates a time interval about year 1000 BC.

A settlement of the Lusatian culture people existed in the 8th century BC. After invasions of Celts beyond upper Danube basin, the area of Legnica and north foothills of Sudetes was infiltrated by Celtic settlers and traders.

Tacitus and Ptolemy recorded the ancient nation of Lugii (Lygii) in the area, and mentioned their town of Lugidunum, which has been attributed to both Legnica and Głogów.

=== Early Poland ===
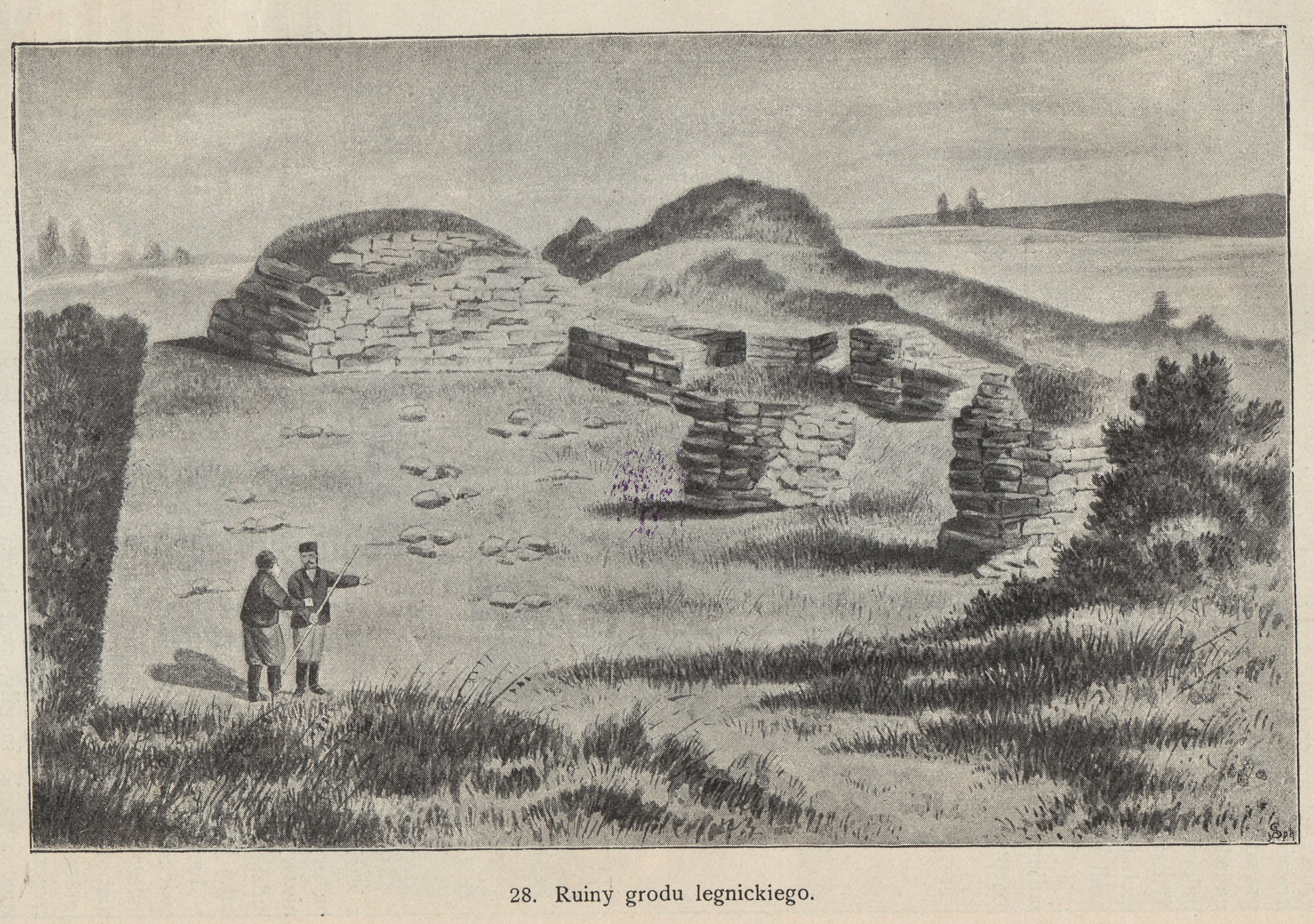
19th-century illustration of the remains of the early Piast stronghold in Legnica

Slavic Lechitic tribes moved into the area in the 8th century.

The city was first officially mentioned in chronicles from 1004, although settlement dates to the 7th century. Dendrochronological research proves that during the reign of Mieszko I of Poland, a new fortified settlement was built here in a style typical of the early Piast dynasty.

At the beginning of the 12th century, Legnica was an important castellan stronghold in Silesia, strategically located within rivers Czarna/Kaczawa marshland. After the death of Bolesław III Wrymouth in 1138, which began a period of feudal fragmentation of Poland, Legnica and all of Silesia first fell under the rule of Władysław II the Exile. Then, after Władysław's expulsion in 1146, it came under the control of Bolesław IV the Curly, who already was the Senior Duke of Poland.

During this time, Legnica essentially became Bolesław the Curly's important residence, especially in his dyplomatic activity context. His frequent sometimes long-lasting presence here helped the settlement at the foot of the stronghold grow quickly. It began to take on the characteristics of a proto-city, developing as a natural support center for the ducal court. Here, merchants and artisans thrived, serving the needs of the duke, his retinue, and the local population. The court's demand for goods and services boosted the settlement's growth. Although it wasn't formally a city under municipal charter yet, it increasingly resembled an urban economic hub. Evidence of its early urban development also includes the construction of the Church of the Blessed Virgin Mary. Its initial building phases, likely dating back to the 12th century, show the settlement's growing importance and its residents' spiritual needs.It is known that High Duke Bolesław IV the Curly funded here at the St. Benedict monastery chapel in year 1149. Also archaeological discoveries, such as a 13th-century mosaic found near this church in Legnica's Old Town, further illustrate the increasing cultural and urban significance of this place in the later Middle Ages, continuing trends that began in the 12th century. Based on fields as medieval economic history, historical demography, medieval urbanisation, historical analogy its logical to assume that around 1160 Legnica reached circa 2,500-2,700 inhabitants (including the main groups: craftsmen, fishers, servants, traders, clergy, retinue, knights, and the garrison).

Bolesław's period in Legnica, as the Poland senior's residence, lasted until around the mid-1160s, when Bolesław I the Tall, son of Władysław the Exile, returned to Silesia. In 1163, Emperor Frederick Barbarossa, through diplomatic channels (the treaty was signed in Nuremberg), forced Bolesław the Curly to return the sons of Władysław the Exile to their father's district. The reason Bolesław the Curly agreed to accept the exiles this time was that after Władysław's death, his sons, being younger than him and lacking support in Poland, did not pose a direct threat to his Senior position, and Bolesław's return to Silesia ultimately neutralized the threat of Imperial intervention. Bolesław the Curly adequately secured his position by retaining military garrisons in the main strongholds of the Silesian province (Legnica, as well as Głogów, Wrocław, Opole, and Racibórz). By the late 12th century, Legnica was one of the largest cities in Silesia and south-western Poland.

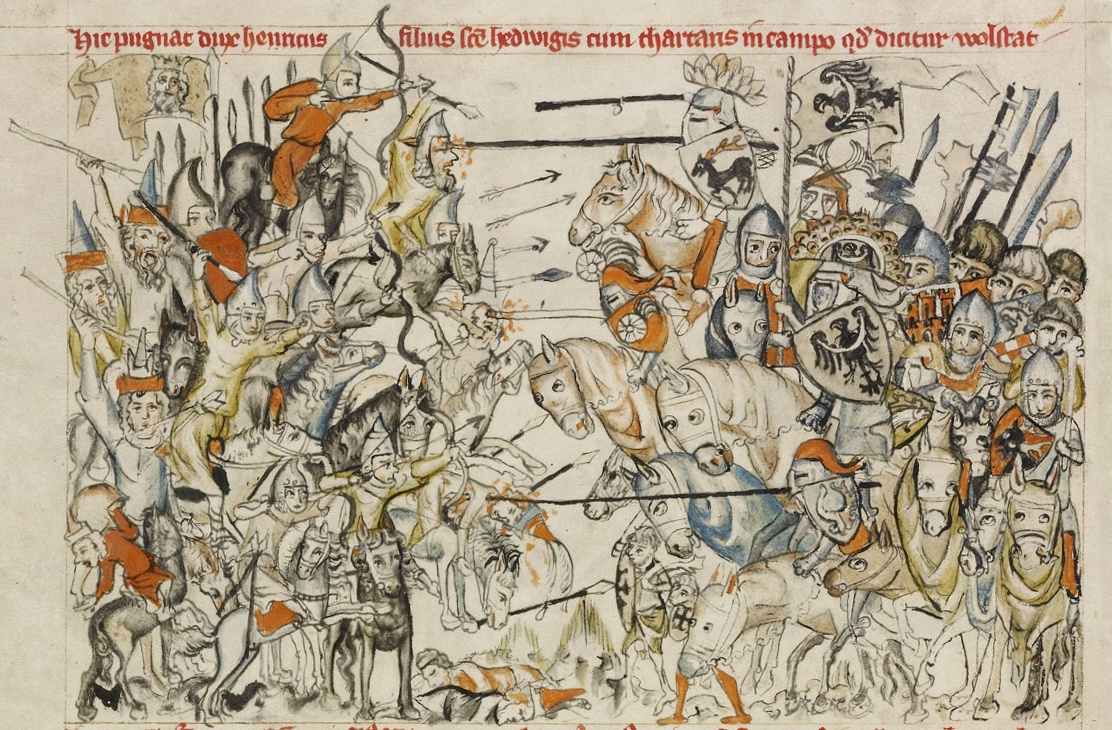
Battle of Legnica, medieval illuminated manuscript, collection of the J. Paul Getty Museum in Los Angeles, California

Later Legnica became famous for the battle that took place at Legnickie Pole near the city on 9 April 1241 during the First Mongol invasion of Poland. The Christian army of the Polish duke Henry II the Pious of Silesia, supported by feudal nobility, which included in addition to Poles, Bavarian miners and military orders and Czech troops, was decisively defeated by the Mongols. The Mongols killed Henry and destroyed his forces, then turned south to rejoin the rest of the Mongol armies, which were massing at the Plain of Mohi in Hungary via Moravia against a coalition of King Bela IV and his armies, and Bela's Kipchak allies.

=== Duchy of Legnica ===
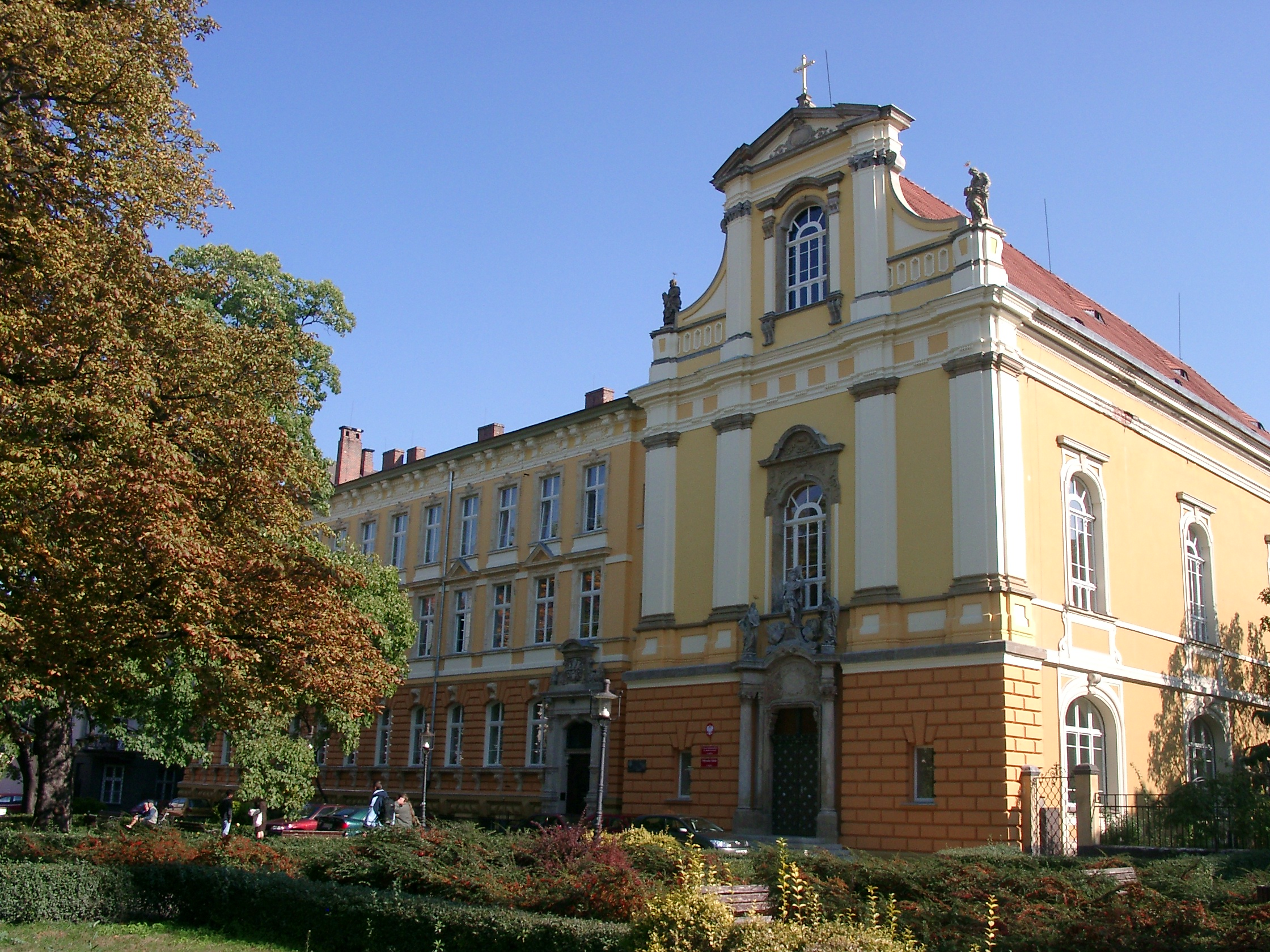
Former Dominican monastery and burial site of Bolesław II the Horned

As a result of further fragmentation of Poland into smaller duchies, Legnica was the seat of an eponymous principality that lasted from 1248 until 1675.

After the war, nonetheless, the city was developing rapidly. In 1258 at the church of St. Peter, a parish school was established, probably the first of its kind in Poland. Around 1278 a Dominican monastery was founded by Bolesław II the Horned, who was buried there as the only monarch of Poland to be buried in Legnica. Already by 1300 there was a city council in Legnica. Duke Bolesław III the Generous granted new trade privileges in 1314 and 1318 and allowed the construction of a town hall, and in 1337 the first waterworks were built. In the years 1327–1380 a new Gothic church of Saint Peter (today's Cathedral) was erected in place of the old one, and is one of Legnica's landmarks since. Also by the 14th century the city walls were erected. In 1345 the first coins were produced in the local mint. In 1374, the potters' guild was founded, as one of the oldest in Silesia. Queen consort of Poland Hedwig of Sagan died in Legnica in 1390 and was buried in the local collegiate church, which has not survived to this day.

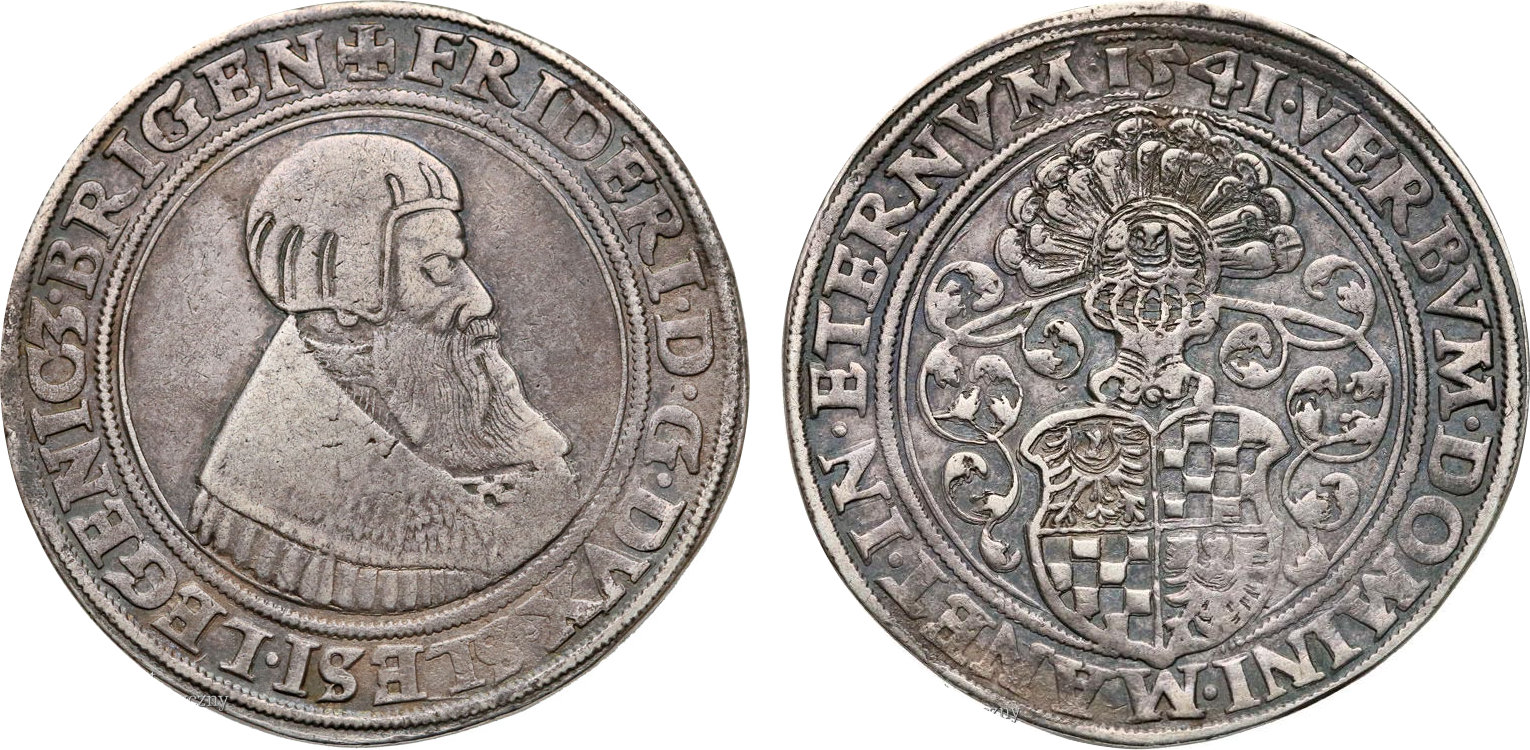
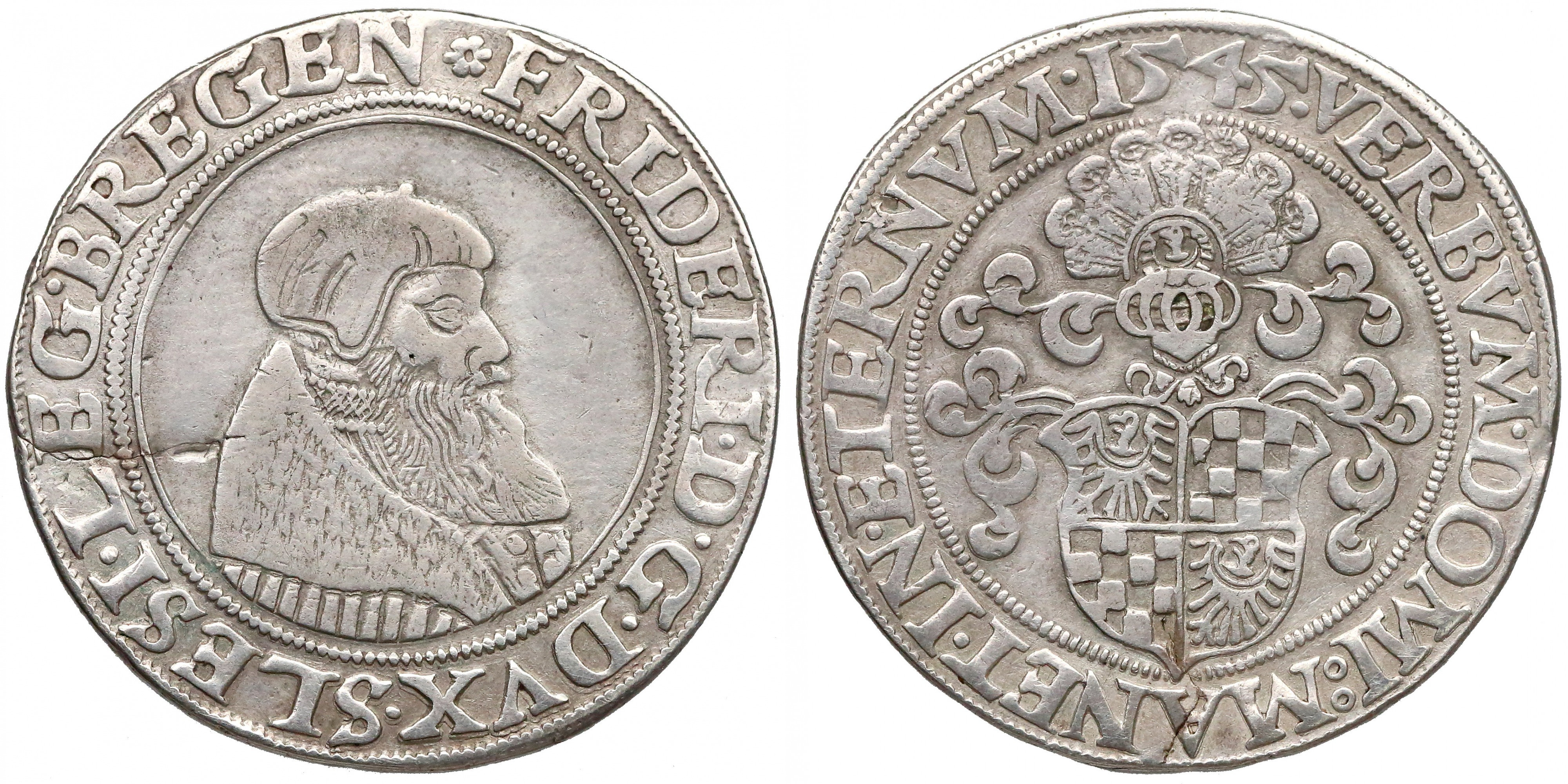
16th-century coins of the Duchy of Legnica from the local mint

As the capital of the Duchy of Legnica at the beginning of the 14th century, Legnica was one of the most important cities of Central Europe, having a population of nearly 16,000 residents. The city began to expand quickly after the discovery of gold in the Kaczawa River between Legnica and Złotoryja (Goldberg). Unfortunately, such a growth rate can not be maintained long. Shortly after the city reached its maximum population increase, wooden buildings which had been erected during this period of rapid growth were devastated by a huge fire. The fire decreased the number of inhabitants in the city and halted any significant further development for many decades.

The Duchy of Legnica became a vassal of the Kingdom of Bohemia during the 14th century, and later of Hungary, however remained ruled by local dukes of the Polish Piast dynasty. In 1454, a local rebellion prevented Legnica from falling under direct rule of the Bohemian kings. In 1505, Duke Frederick II of Legnica met in Legnica with the duke of nearby Głogów, Sigismund I the Old, the future king of Poland.

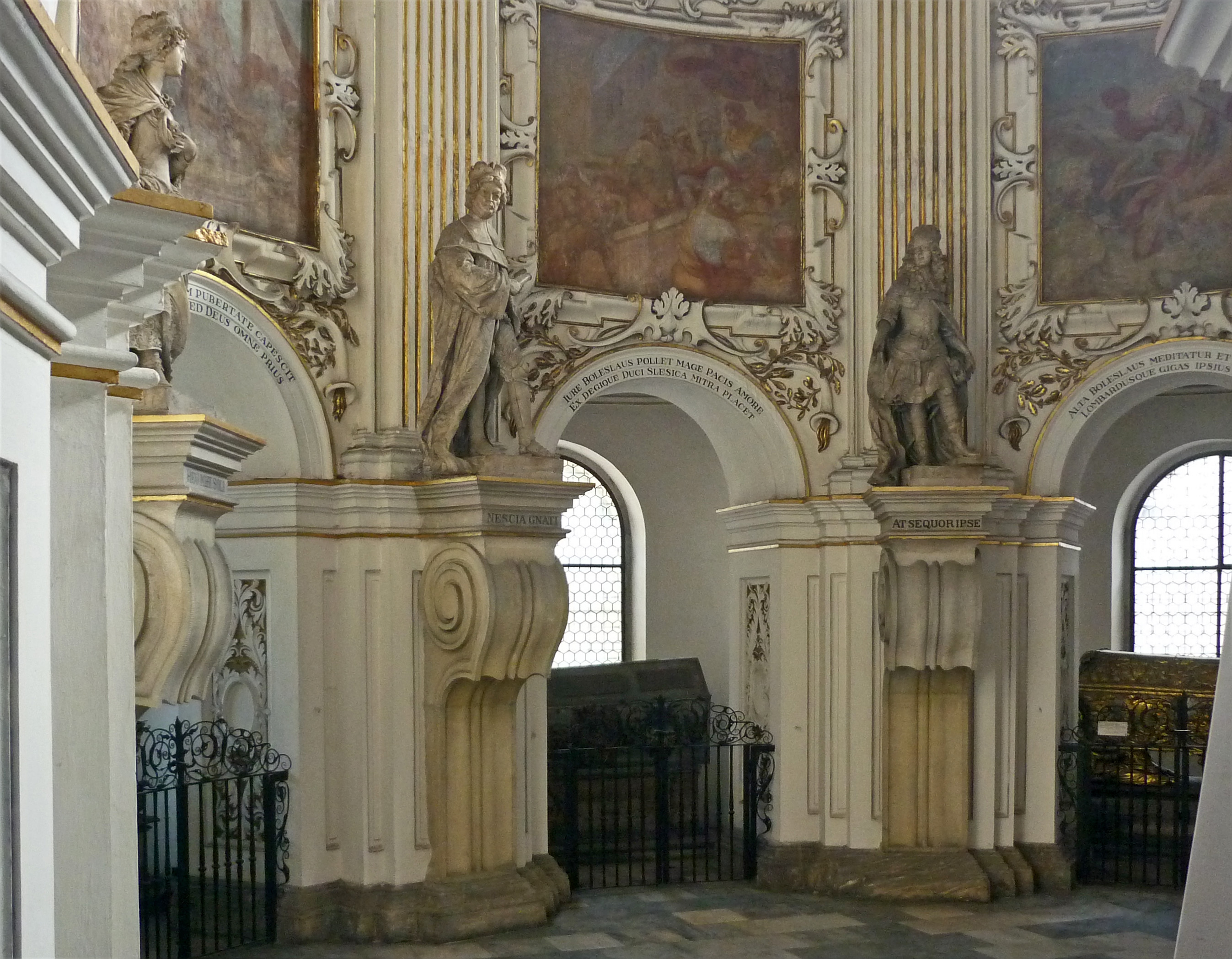
Mausoleum of the last Piast dukes in the Saint John the Baptist church

The Protestant Reformation was introduced in the duchy as early as 1522 and the population became Lutheran. In 1526, a Protestant university was established in Legnica, which, however, was closed in 1529. In 1528 the first printing house in Legnica was established. After the death of King Louis II of Hungary and Bohemia at Mohács in 1526, Legnica became a fief of the Habsburg monarchy of Austria. The first map of Silesia was made by native son Martin Helwig. The city suffered during the Thirty Years' War. In 1633 a plague epidemic broke out, and in 1634 the Austrian army destroyed the suburbs. A Jesuit college was based in the city in the 17th and 18th centuries.

In 1668 Duke of Legnica Christian presented his candidacy to the Polish throne, however, in the 1669 Polish–Lithuanian royal election he wasn't chosen as King. In 1676, Legnica passed to direct Habsburg rule after the death of the last Silesian Piast duke and the last Piast duke overall, George William (son of Duke Christian), despite the earlier inheritance pact by Brandenburg and Silesia, by which it was to go to Brandenburg. The last Piast duke was buried in the St. John's church in Legnica in 1676.

=== 18th and 19th centuries ===
In the early 18th century, the Liegnitz Ritter-Akademie was established. It educated the sons of magnates and nobles from Silesia, the Polish-Lithuanian Commonwealth, the Habsburg Monarchy, and from German states. One of two main routes connecting Warsaw and Dresden ran through the city in the 18th century and Kings Augustus II the Strong and Augustus III of Poland traveled that route many times. The postal milestone of King Augustus II comes from that period.

In 1742 most of Silesia, including Liegnitz, became part of the Kingdom of Prussia after King Frederick the Great's defeat of Austria in the War of the Austrian Succession. In 1760 during the Seven Years' War, Liegnitz was the site of the Battle of Liegnitz when Frederick's army defeated an Austrian army led by Laudon.

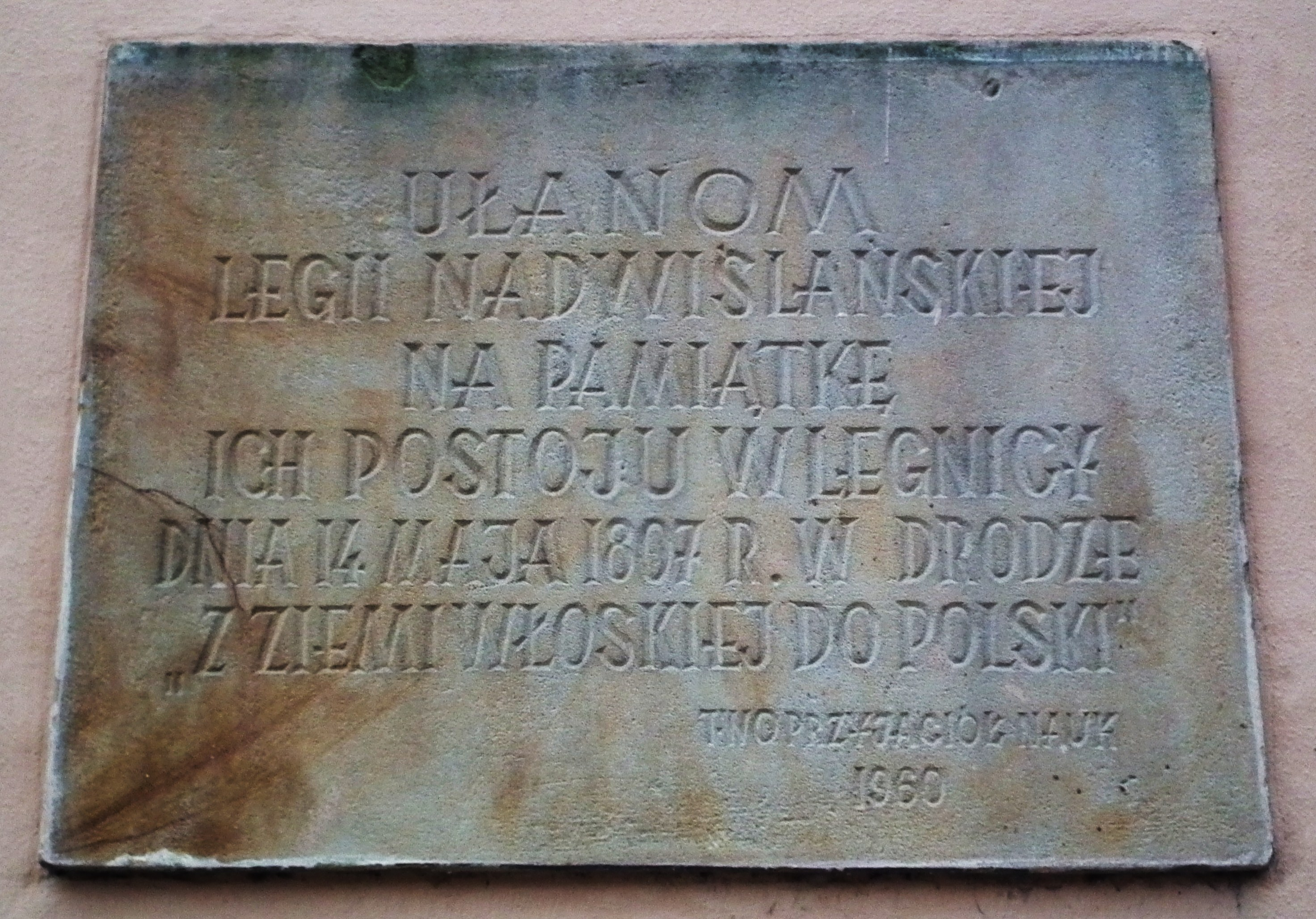
Plaque commemorating the stay of Polish uhlans in 1807

During the Napoleonic Wars and Polish national liberation fights, in 1807 Polish uhlans were stationed in the city, and in 1813, the Prussians, under Field Marshal Blücher, defeated the French forces of MacDonald in the Battle of Katzbach (Kaczawa) nearby. After the administrative reorganization of the Prussian state following the Congress of Vienna, Liegnitz and the surrounding territory (Landkreis Liegnitz) were incorporated into the Regierungsbezirk (administrative district) of Liegnitz, within the Province of Silesia on 1 May 1816. In 1843, a theater was established. The city was visited by writers Fryderyk Skarbek and Stanisław Wyspiański.

Along with the rest of Prussia, the town became part of the German Empire in 1871 during the unification of Germany. On 1 January 1874 Liegnitz became the third city in Lower Silesia (after Breslau and Görlitz) to be raised to an urban district, although the district administrator of the surrounding Landkreis of Liegnitz continued to have his seat in the city. Its military garrison was home to Königsgrenadier-Regiment Nr. 7 a military unit formed almost exclusively out of Polish soldiers.

=== The 20th century ===
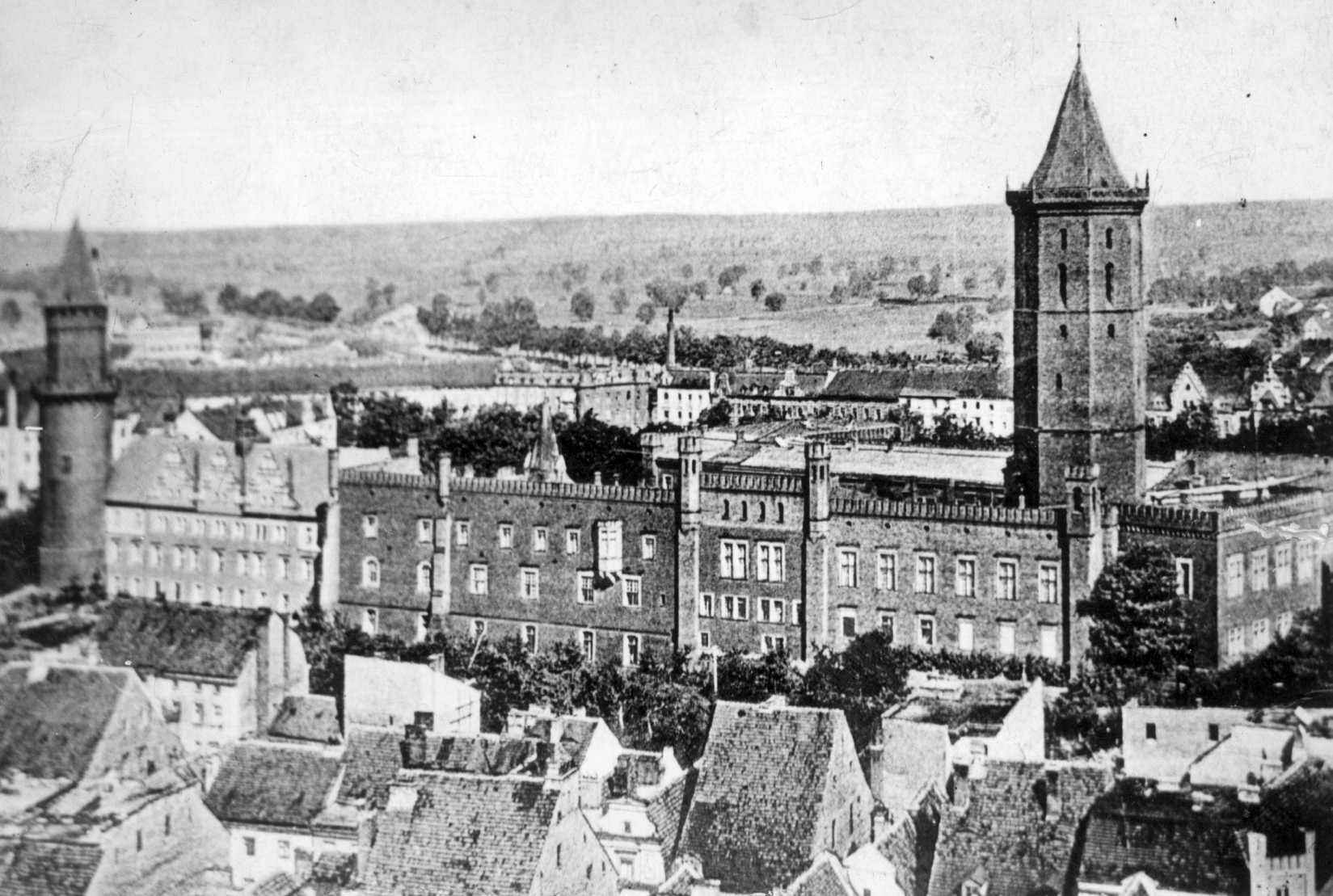
Old view of the Piast Castle

The census of 1910 gave Liegnitz's population as 95.86% German, 0.15% German and Polish, 1.27% Polish, 2.26% Wendish, and 0.19% Czech. On 1 April 1937 parts of the Landkreis of Liegnitz communities of Alt Beckern (Piekary), Groß Beckern (Piekary Wielkie), Hummel, Liegnitzer Vorwerke, Pfaffendorf (Piątnica) und Prinkendorf (Przybków) were incorporated into the city limits. After the Treaty of Versailles following World War I, Liegnitz was part of the newly created Province of Lower Silesia from 1919 to 1938, then of the Province of Silesia from 1938 to 1941, and again of the province of Lower Silesia from 1941 to 1945. After the Nazi Party came to power in Germany, as early as 1933, a boycott of local Jewish premises was ordered, during the Kristallnacht in 1938 the synagogue was burned down, and in 1939 the local Polish population was terrorized and persecuted. A Nazi court prison was operated in the city with a forced labour subcamp. During World War II, several members of the Polish resistance movement were imprisoned and sentenced to death there. The Germans also established two forced labour camps in the city, as well as two prisoner of war labor subcamps of the POW camp located in Żagań (then Sagan), and one labor subcamp of the Stalag VIII-A POW camp in Zgorzelec (then Görlitz).

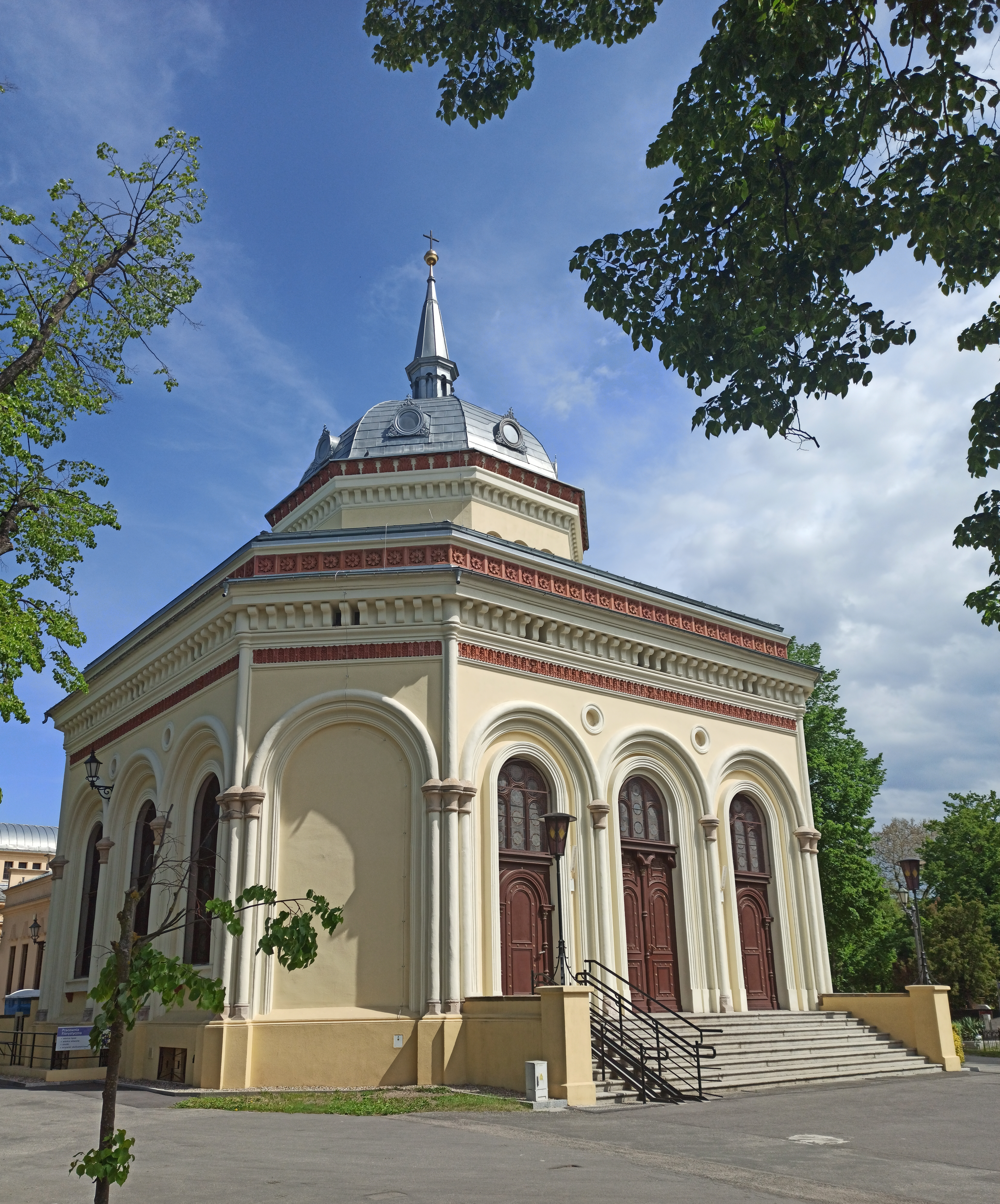
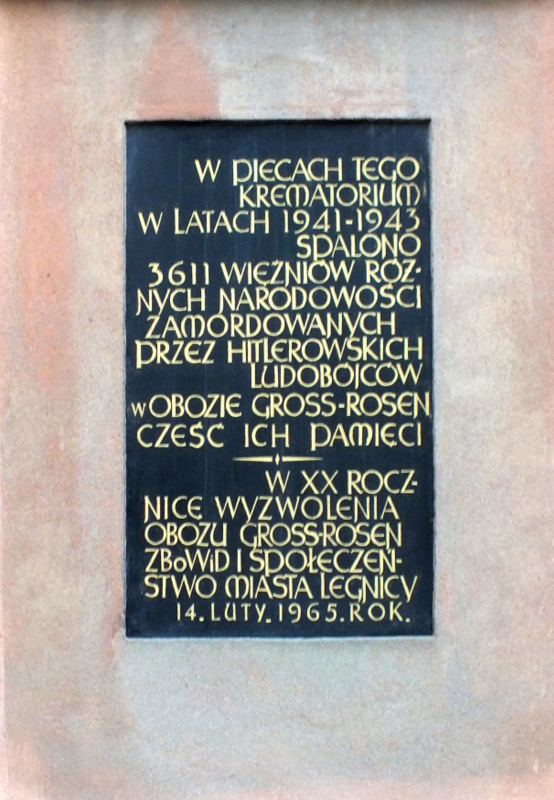
Cemetery chapel with a plaque honoring 3,611 prisoners of the Gross-Rosen concentration camp cremated there by Nazi Germany

After the defeat of Nazi Germany, the city was transferred to Poland following the Potsdam Conference in 1945, although with a Soviet-installed communist regime, which stayed in power until the Fall of Communism in the 1980s. The majority of the German population either fled or was expelled from the city.

The city was repopulated with Poles, including expellees from pre-war eastern Poland after its annexation by the Soviet Union. Also Greeks, refugees of the Greek Civil War, settled in Legnica in 1950. As the medieval Polish name Lignica was considered archaic, the town was renamed Legnica. The transfer to Poland decided at Potsdam in 1945 was officially recognized by East Germany in 1950, by West Germany under Chancellor Willy Brandt in the 1970 Treaty of Warsaw, and finally by the reunited Germany by the Two Plus Four Agreement in 1990. By 1990 only a handful of Polonized Germans, prewar citizens of Liegnitz, remained of the pre-1945 German population. In 2010, the city administration and local officials marked the 65th anniversary of what they officially designated as the "return of Legnica to the Motherland" and its "liberation from Nazi Germany."

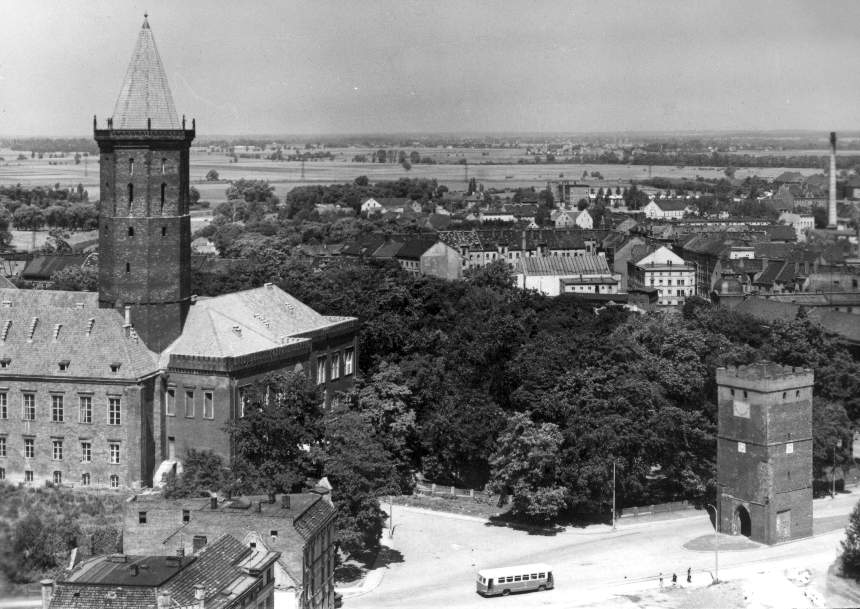
Post-war view of the Piast Castle (on the left) and the Głogów Gate (on the right)

The city was only partly damaged in World War II. Some 75% of industry and 15% of buildings were destroyed. In June 1945 Legnica was briefly the capital of the Lower Silesian District, after the administration was moved there from Trzebnica and before it was finally moved to Wrocław. In 1947, the Municipal Library was opened, in 1948 a piano factory was founded, and in the years 1951-1959 Poland's first copper smelter was built in Legnica. After 1965 most parts of the preserved old town with its town houses were demolished, the historical layout was abolished, and the city was rebuilt in modern form.

From 1945 to 1990, during the Cold War, the headquarters of the Soviet forces in Poland, the so-called Northern Group of Forces, was located in the city. This fact had a strong influence on the life of the city. For much of the period, the city was divided into Polish and Soviet areas, with the latter closed to the public. These were first established in July 1945, when the Soviets forcibly ejected newly arrived Polish inhabitants from the parts of the city they wanted for their own use. The ejection was perceived by some as a particularly brutal action, and rumours circulated exaggerating its severity, though no evidence of anyone being killed in the course of it has come to light. In April 1946 city officials estimated that there were 16,700 Poles, 12,800 Germans, and 60,000 Soviets in Legnica. The last Soviet units left the city in 1993.

The Polish anti-communist resistance was active in Legnica. Władysław Dybowski, former leader of the Kraków National Defense Brigade, a Polish resistance organization from World War II, has been appointed deputy mayor of the city. As deputy mayor, he established contacts with Soviet generals stationed in the city, and gathered intelligence on the Soviet army, which he then passed on to the Polish government-in-exile in London, before he was arrested in October 1946 and sentenced to death in June 1947. In the following years, the resistance remained active in Legnica, including the nationwide Home Army and Freedom and Independence Association, and seven local youth organizations. In October 1956, the largest anti-Soviet demonstrations in Lower Silesia took place in Legnica.

In 1959, the Society of Friends of Science in Legnica was founded, and in 1964, a regional museum was established. Since 1961, the annual cultural event "Legnica Days" has been held. In 1967, the Legnica Poetry Days were launched.

Between 1 June 1975 and 31 December 1998 Legnica was the capital of the Legnica Voivodeship. In 1992 the Roman Catholic Diocese of Legnica was established, Tadeusz Rybak became the first bishop of Legnica. New local newspapers and a radio station were founded in the 1990s. In 1997, Legnica was visited by Pope John Paul II. The city suffered in the 1997 Central European flood.

== Climate ==
Legnica has an oceanic climate (Köppen climate classification: Cfb).

Climate data for Legnica (1991–2020 normals, extremes 1951–present)
Month	Jan	Feb	Mar	Apr	May	Jun	Jul	Aug	Sep	Oct	Nov	Dec	Year
Record high °C (°F)	18.4 (65.1)	20.0 (68.0)	24.8 (76.6)	29.5 (85.1)	31.4 (88.5)	36.9 (98.4)	37.3 (99.1)	38.4 (101.1)	35.1 (95.2)	29.3 (84.7)	20.6 (69.1)	18.1 (64.6)	38.4 (101.1)
Mean daily maximum °C (°F)	3.1 (37.6)	4.6 (40.3)	8.9 (48.0)	15.1 (59.2)	19.6 (67.3)	23.0 (73.4)	25.6 (78.1)	25.5 (77.9)	20.0 (68.0)	14.2 (57.6)	8.1 (46.6)	4.2 (39.6)	14.3 (57.7)
Daily mean °C (°F)	0.2 (32.4)	1.2 (34.2)	4.4 (39.9)	9.5 (49.1)	13.9 (57.0)	17.3 (63.1)	19.5 (67.1)	19.2 (66.6)	14.5 (58.1)	9.7 (49.5)	4.8 (40.6)	1.4 (34.5)	9.6 (49.3)
Mean daily minimum °C (°F)	−2.8 (27.0)	−2.0 (28.4)	0.5 (32.9)	3.9 (39.0)	8.1 (46.6)	11.6 (52.9)	13.5 (56.3)	13.2 (55.8)	9.6 (49.3)	5.6 (42.1)	1.8 (35.2)	−1.5 (29.3)	5.1 (41.2)
Record low °C (°F)	−27.8 (−18.0)	−29.7 (−21.5)	−21.4 (−6.5)	−7.6 (18.3)	−2.1 (28.2)	0.5 (32.9)	3.4 (38.1)	3.4 (38.1)	−3.2 (26.2)	−6.3 (20.7)	−16.8 (1.8)	−24.7 (−12.5)	−29.7 (−21.5)
Average precipitation mm (inches)	25.0 (0.98)	22.3 (0.88)	33.3 (1.31)	25.9 (1.02)	57.8 (2.28)	65.9 (2.59)	89.6 (3.53)	64.4 (2.54)	48.4 (1.91)	35.7 (1.41)	28.9 (1.14)	24.5 (0.96)	521.6 (20.54)
Average extreme snow depth cm (inches)	4.4 (1.7)	4.3 (1.7)	3.2 (1.3)	0.4 (0.2)	0.1 (0.0)	0.0 (0.0)	0.0 (0.0)	0.0 (0.0)	0.0 (0.0)	0.4 (0.2)	1.8 (0.7)	3.1 (1.2)	4.4 (1.7)
Average precipitation days (≥ 0.1 mm)	15.47	13.10	14.03	10.80	13.00	13.90	13.50	11.97	11.37	12.97	13.70	14.63	158.43
Average snowy days (≥ 0 cm)	11.6	9.2	4.3	0.4	0.1	0.0	0.0	0.0	0.0	0.2	2.7	6.6	35.1
Average relative humidity (%)	83.6	80.6	76.9	70.5	72.3	72.6	70.4	70.5	77.2	81.5	86.1	84.9	77.3
Mean monthly sunshine hours	58.2	81.7	126.0	196.7	238.3	237.6	249.2	242.6	162.5	119.1	66.3	53.3	1,831.4
Source 1: Institute of Meteorology and Water Management
Source 2: Meteomodel.pl (records, relative humidity 1991–2020)

== Sights ==
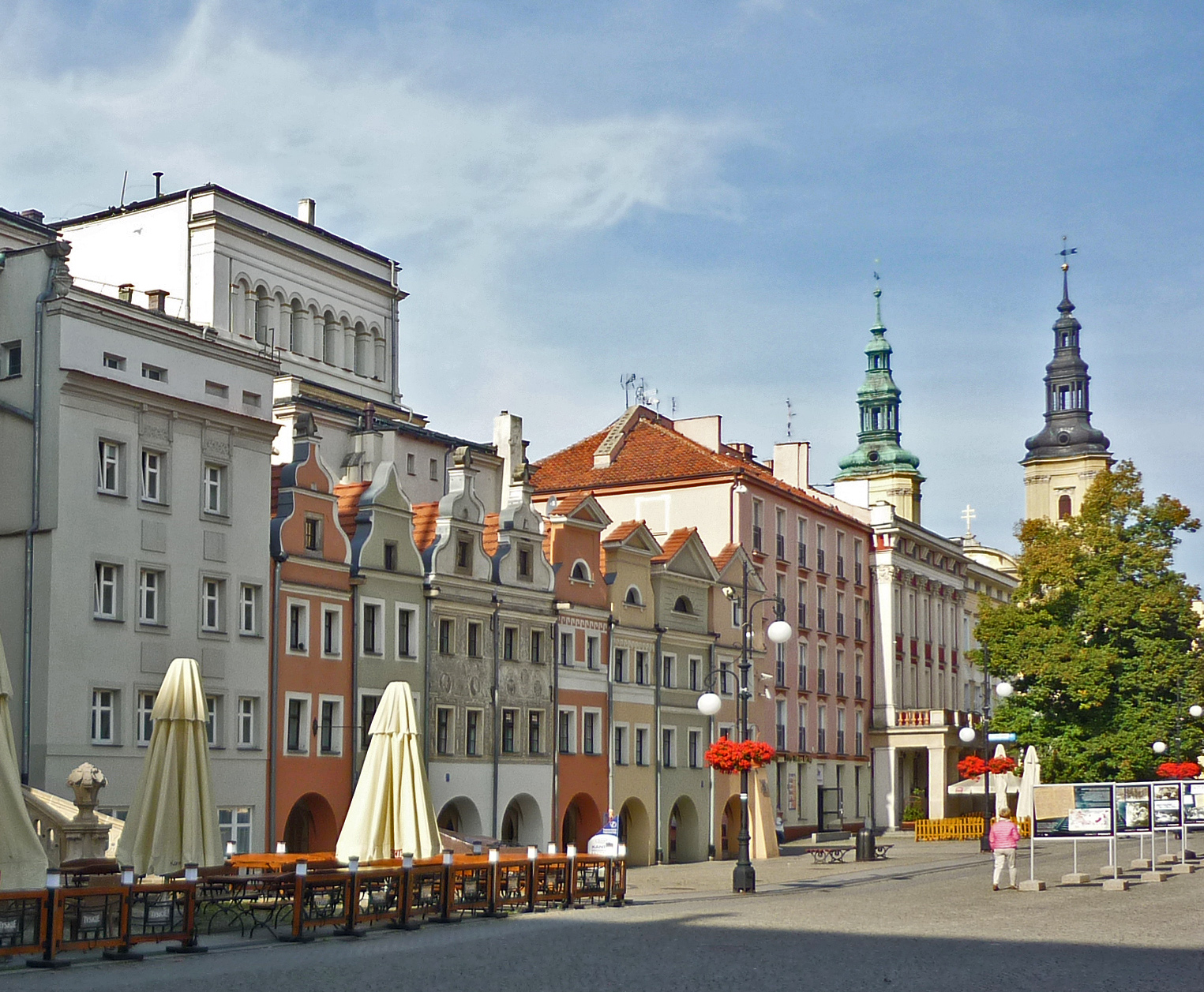
Market Square filled with baroque and neoclassical architecture

Legnica is a city with rich historical architecture, ranging from Romanesque and Gothic through the Renaissance and Baroque to Historicist styles. Among the landmarks of Legnica are:

- the Piast Castle, former seat of the local dukes of the Piast dynasty
- Cathedral of Saints Peter and Paul
- Market Square (Rynek) with:
  - Baroque Old Town Hall (Stary Ratusz)
  - Helena Modrzejewska Theatre
  - Kamienice Śledziowe ("Herring Houses")
  - Dom Pod Przepiórczym Koszem ("Under the Quail Basket House")
- former Dominican and later Benedictine monastery, founded by Bolesław II the Horned, who was buried there as the only monarch of Poland to be buried in Legnica; nowadays housing the I Liceum Ogólnokształcące im. Tadeusza Kościuszki (high school)
- Saint John the Baptist Church with a mausoleum of the last Piast dukes
- New Town Hall (Nowy Ratusz), seat of city authorities
- Saint Mary church
- Copper Museum (Muzeum Miedzi)
- Medieval Chojnów and Głogów Gates, remnants of the medieval city walls
- Scultetus Tenement House
- Former Knight Academy, now housing municipal offices and a branch of the Copper Museum
- Public Library and archive
- Park Miejski ("City Park"), the oldest and largest park of Legnica

There is also a monument of Pope John Paul II and a postal milestone of King Augustus II the Strong from 1725 in Legnica.

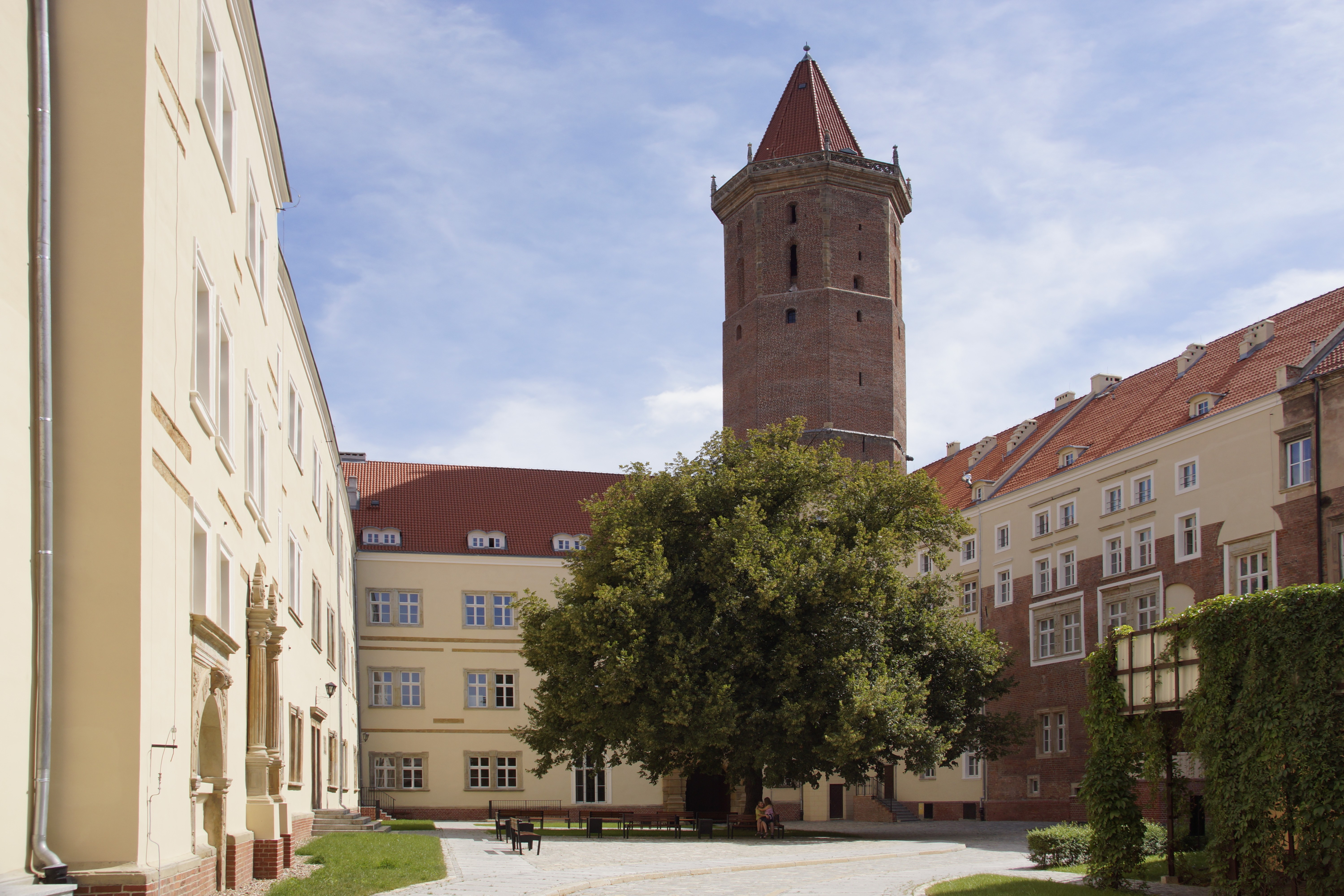
Piast Castle courtyard

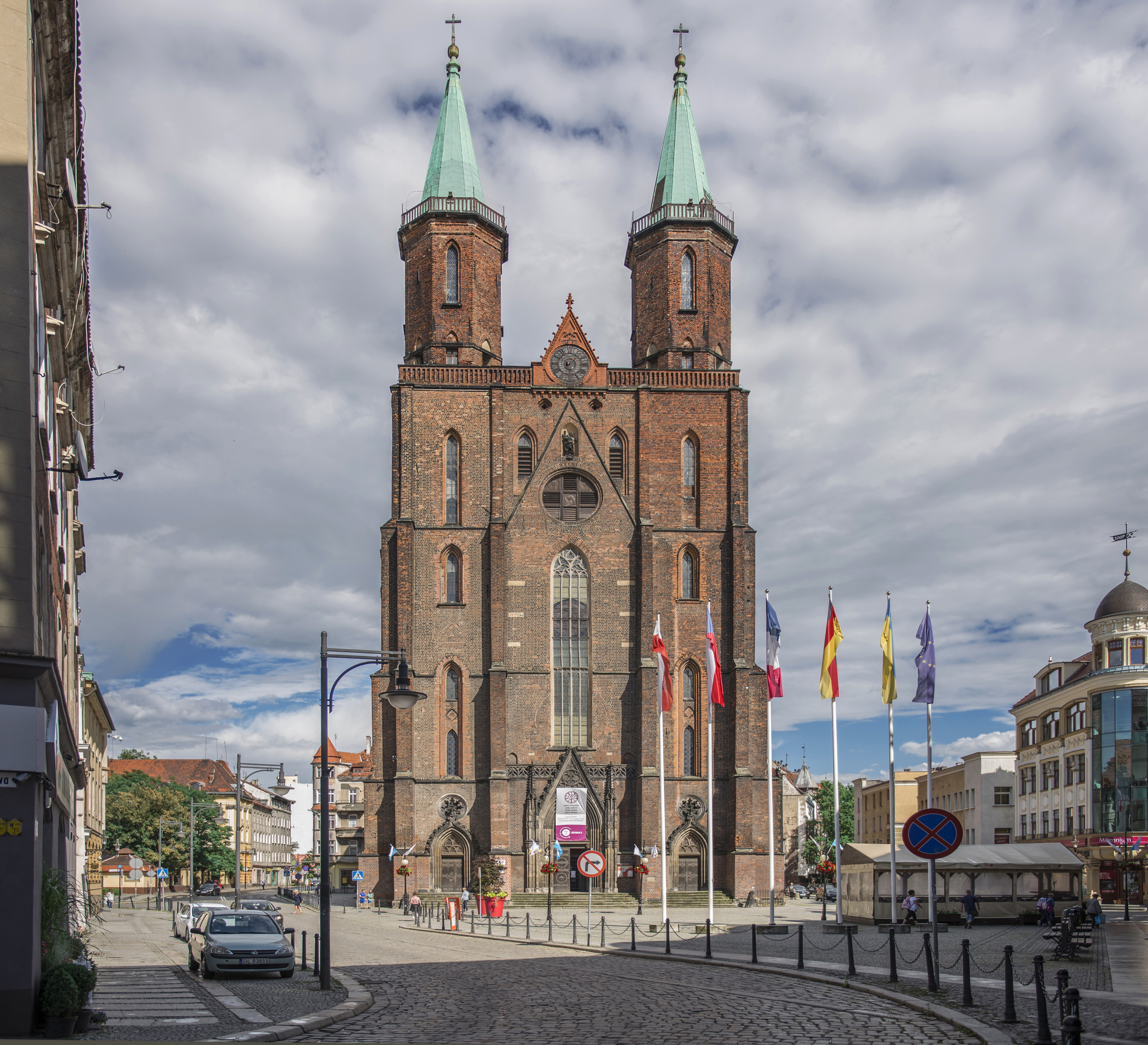
Saint Mary church

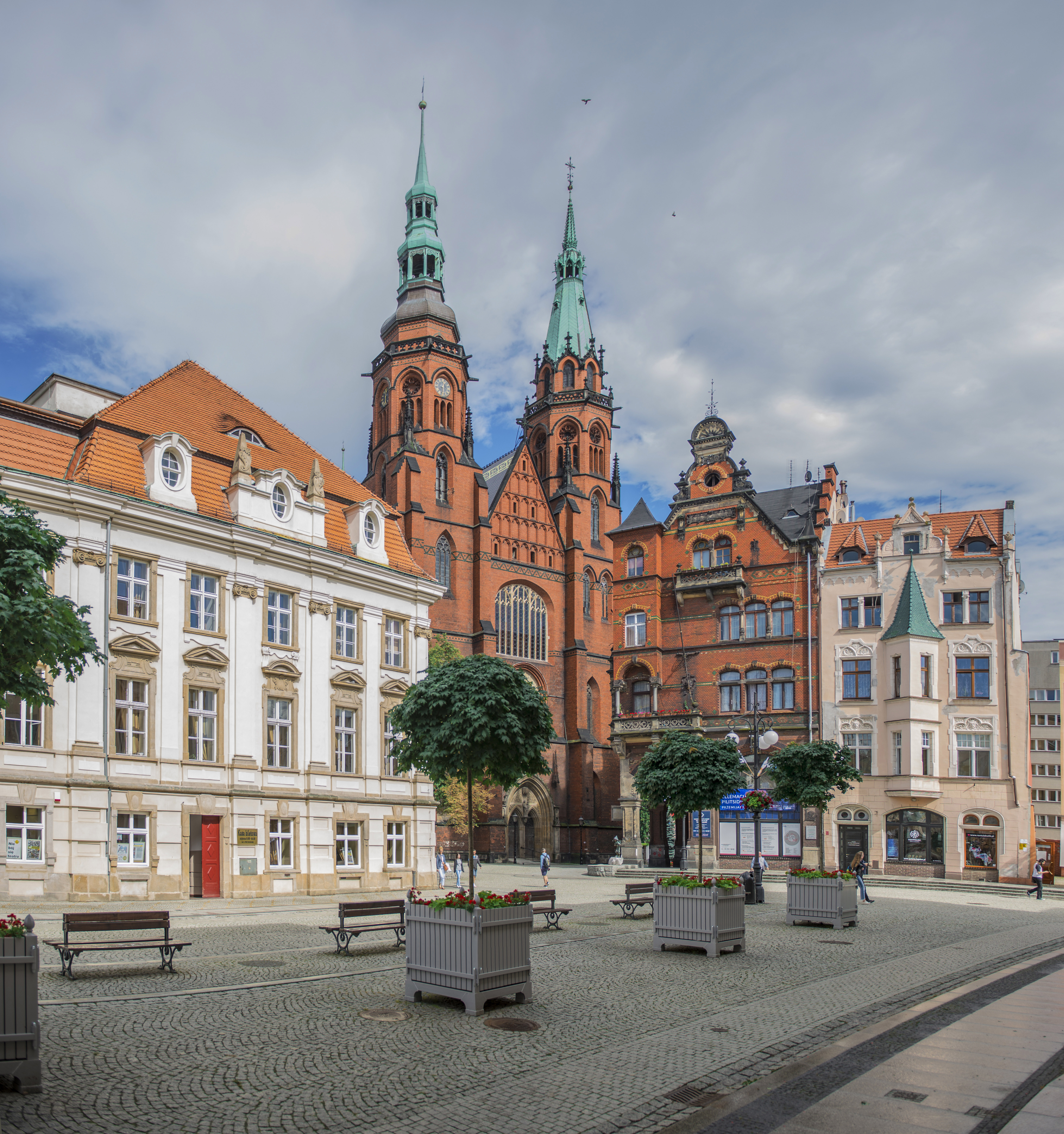
Cathedral of Saint Apostles Peter and Paul

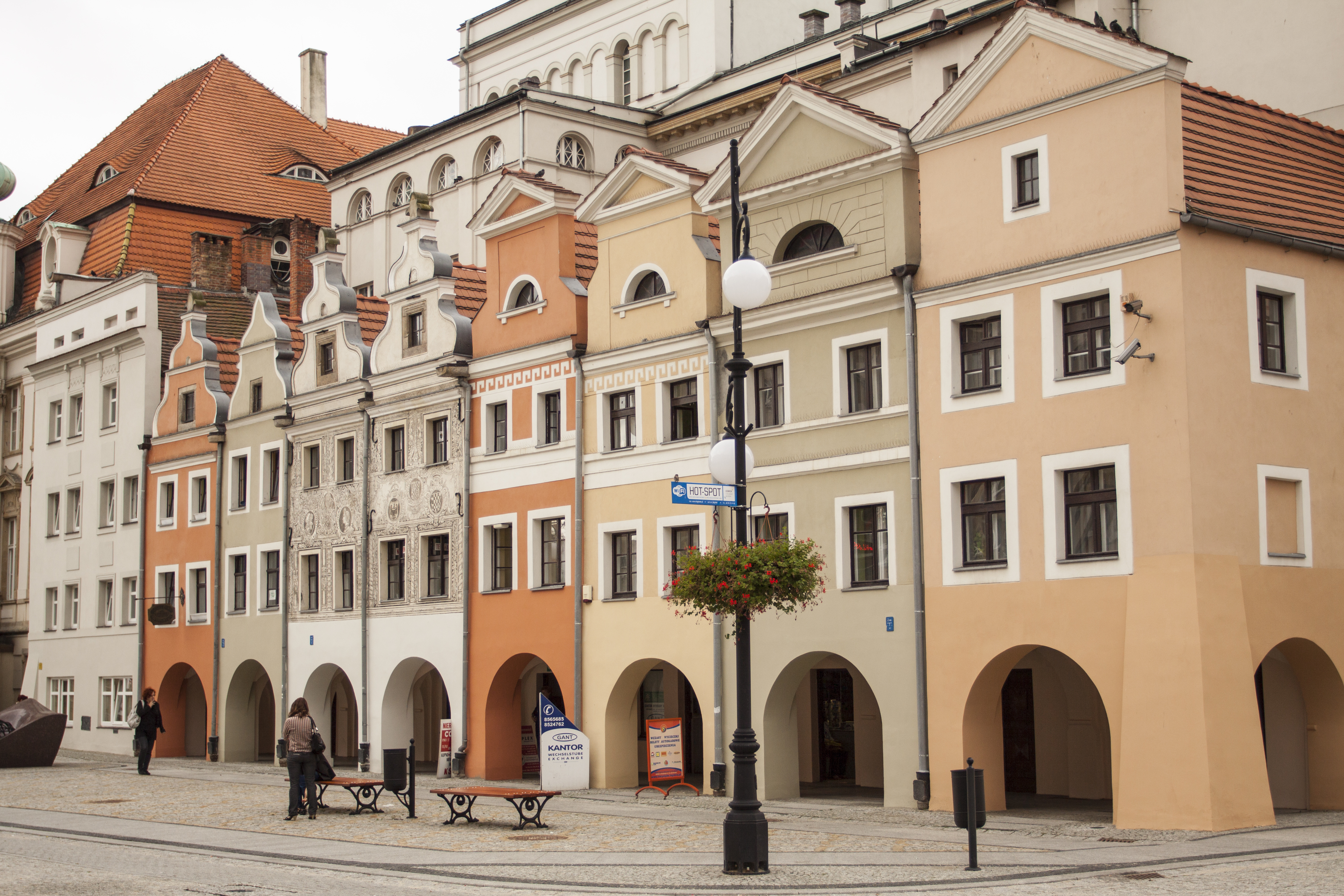
Kamienice Śledziowe at the Market Square

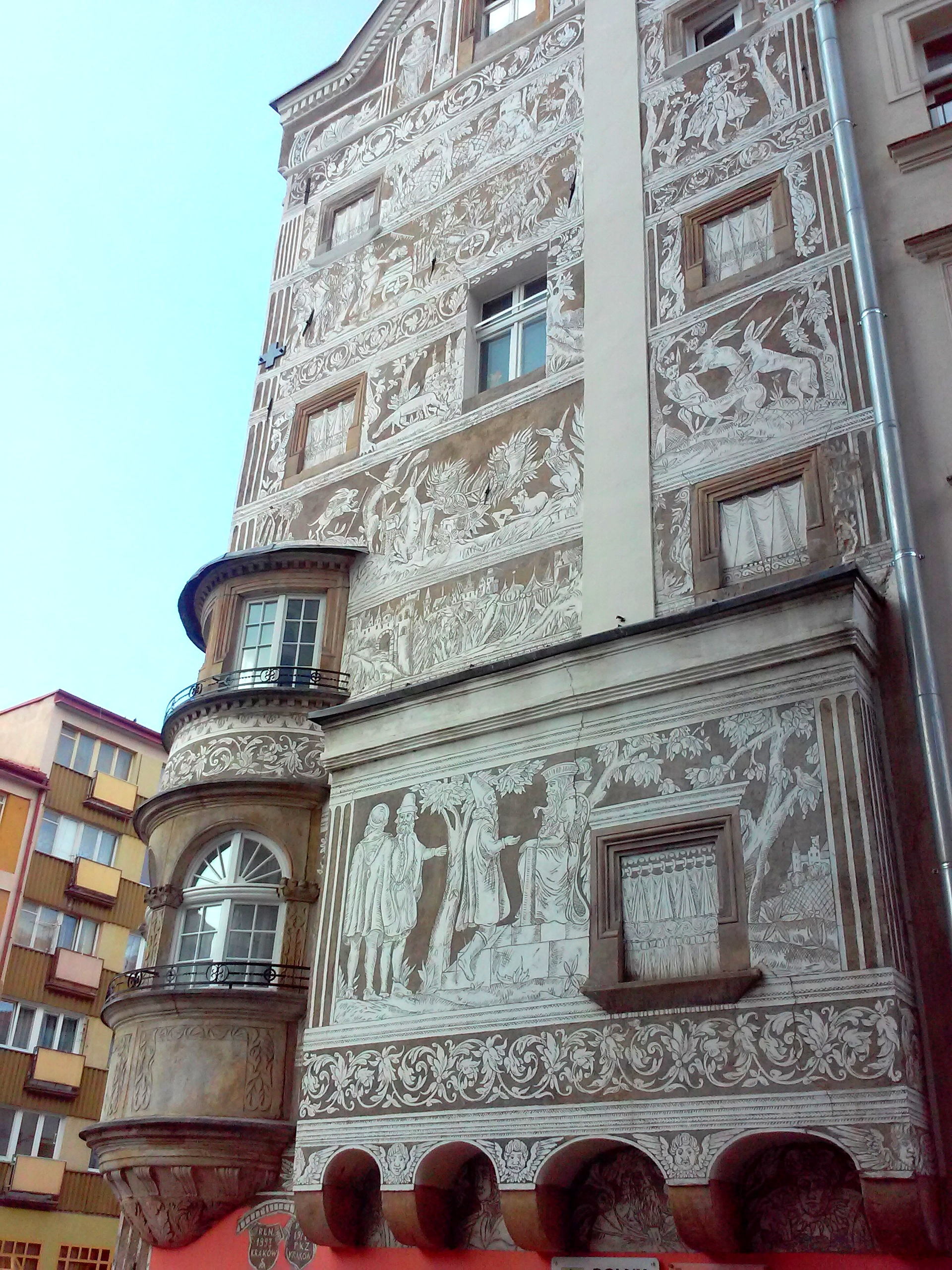
Under the Quail Basket House

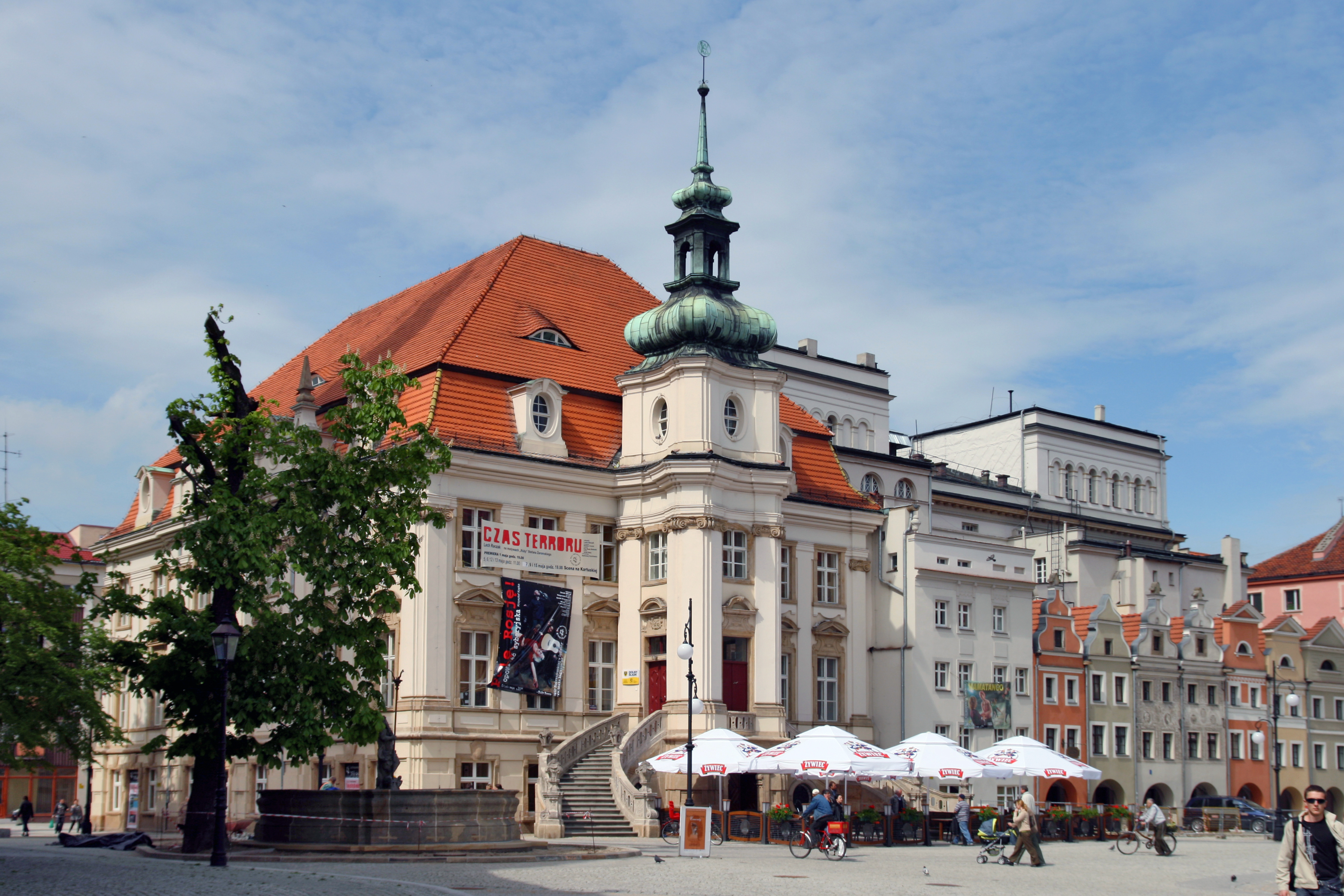
Old City Hall

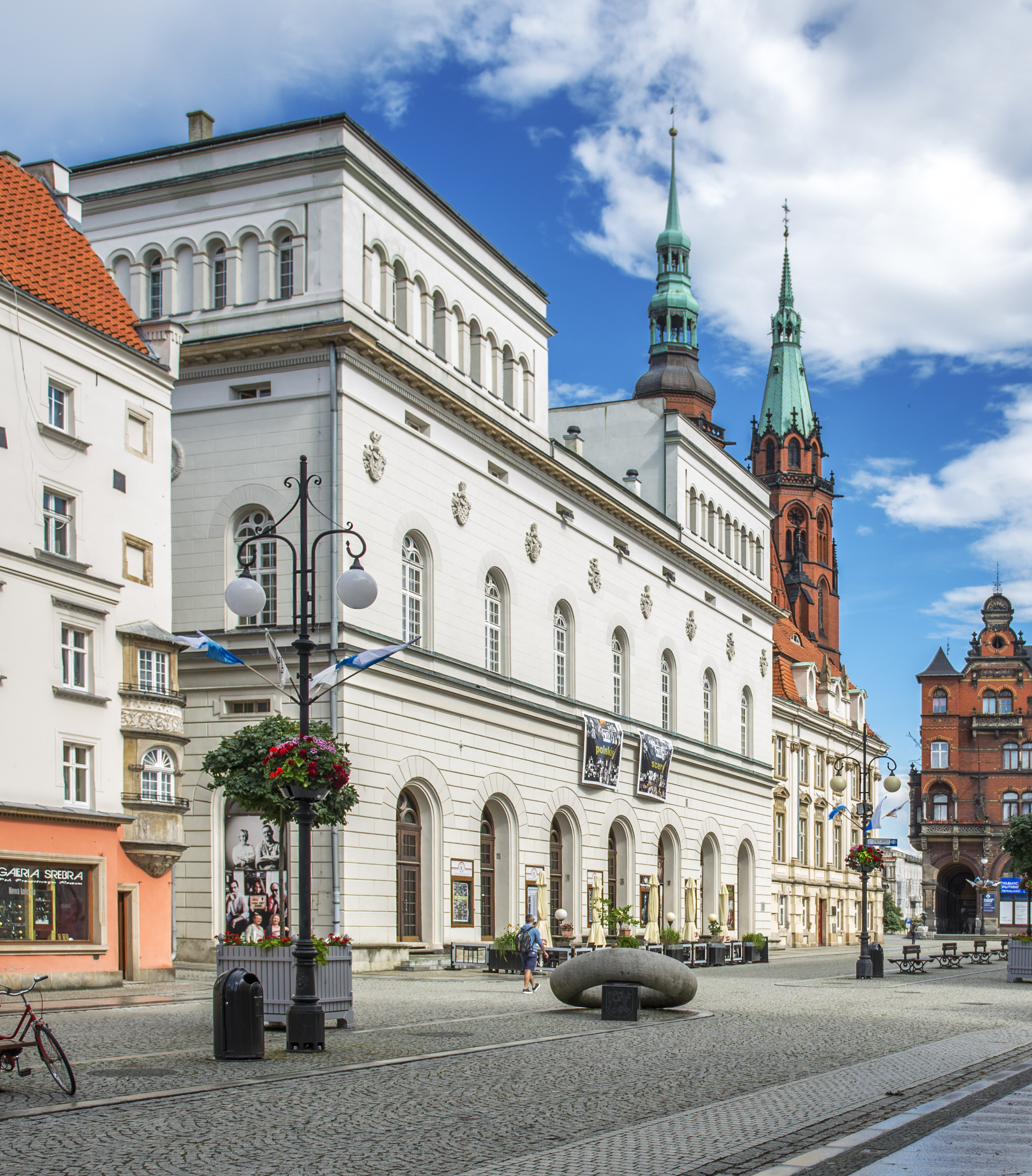
Helena Modrzejewska Theatre

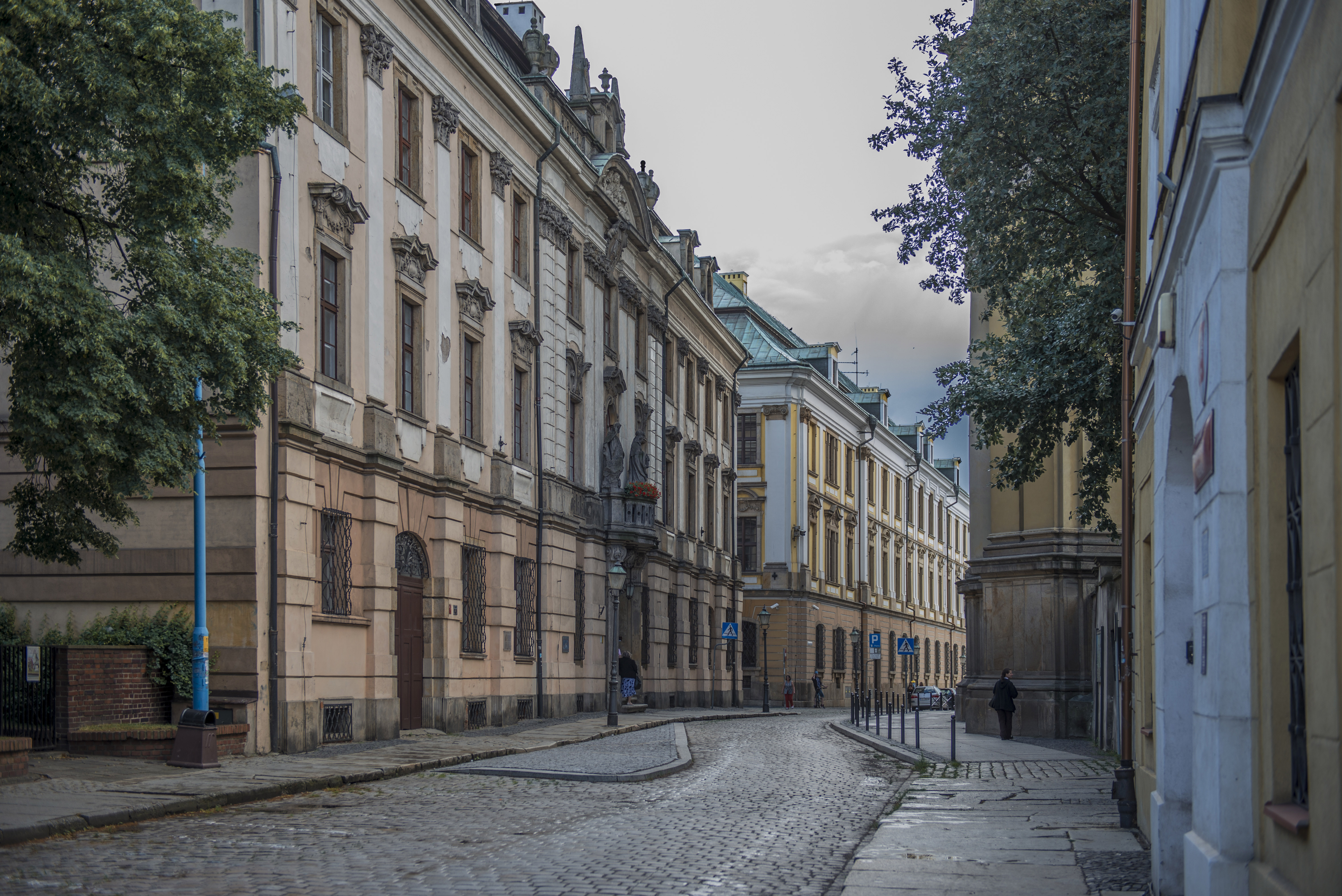
Copper Museum

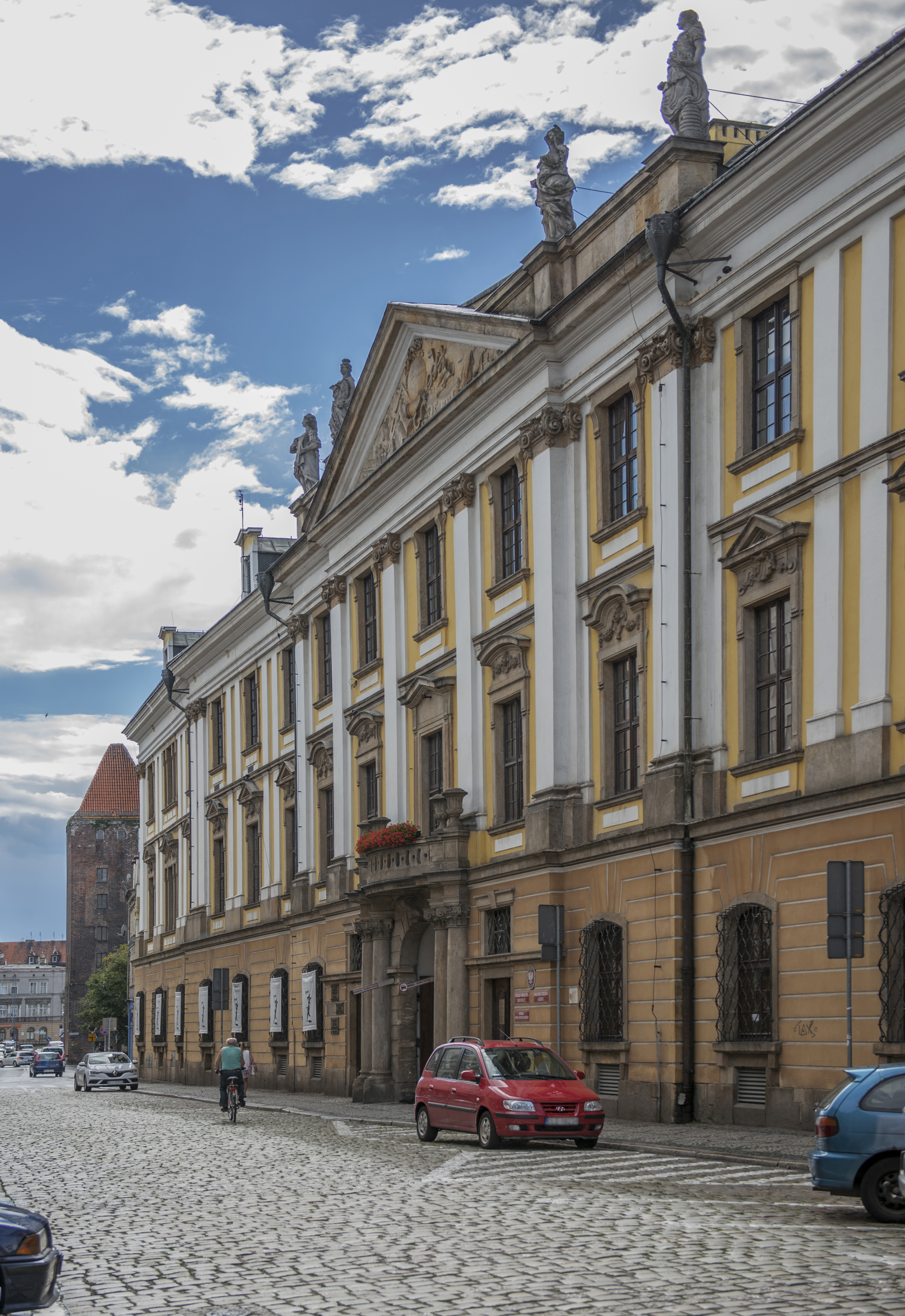
Former knight academy

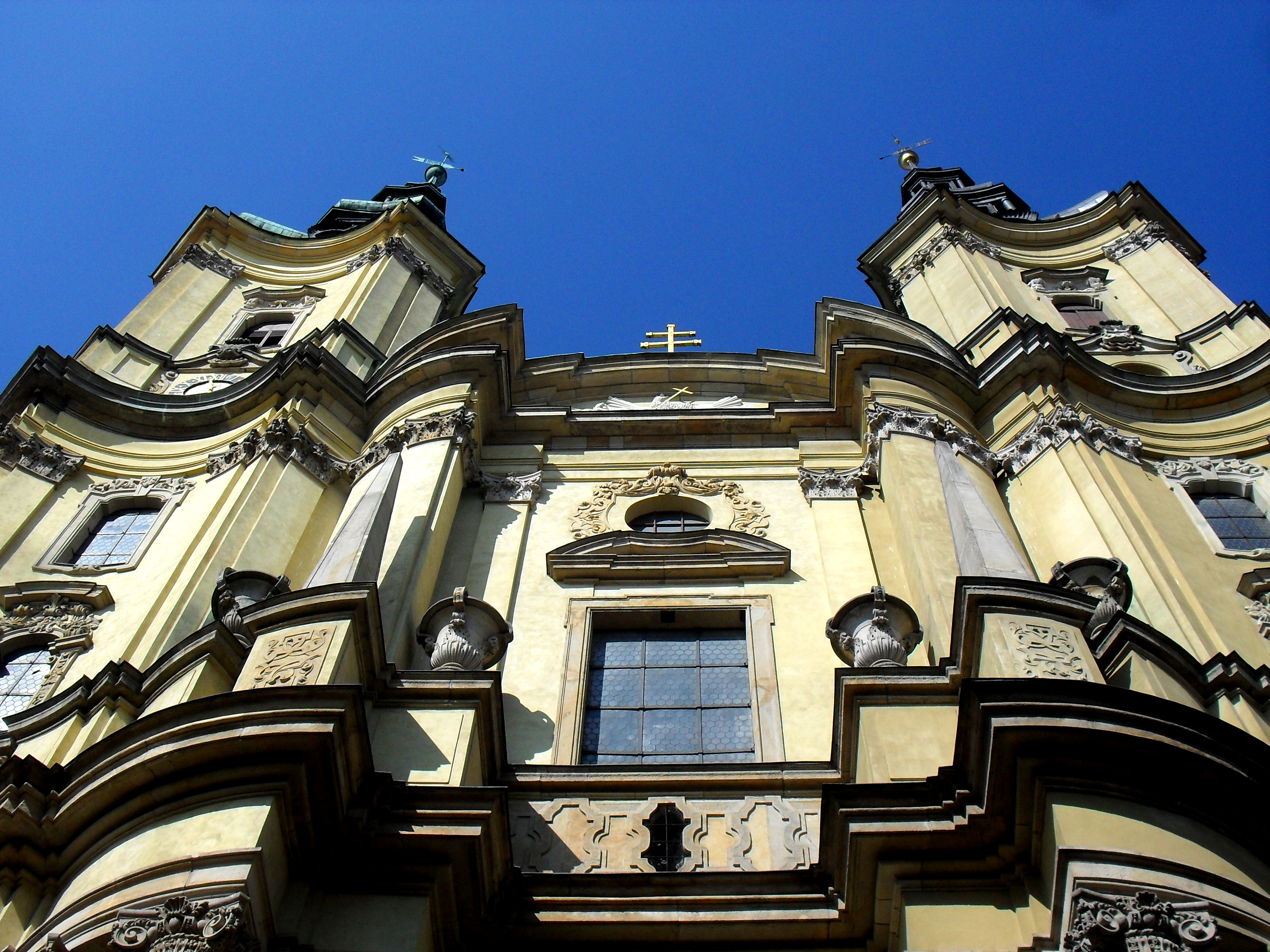
Church of St. John the Baptist

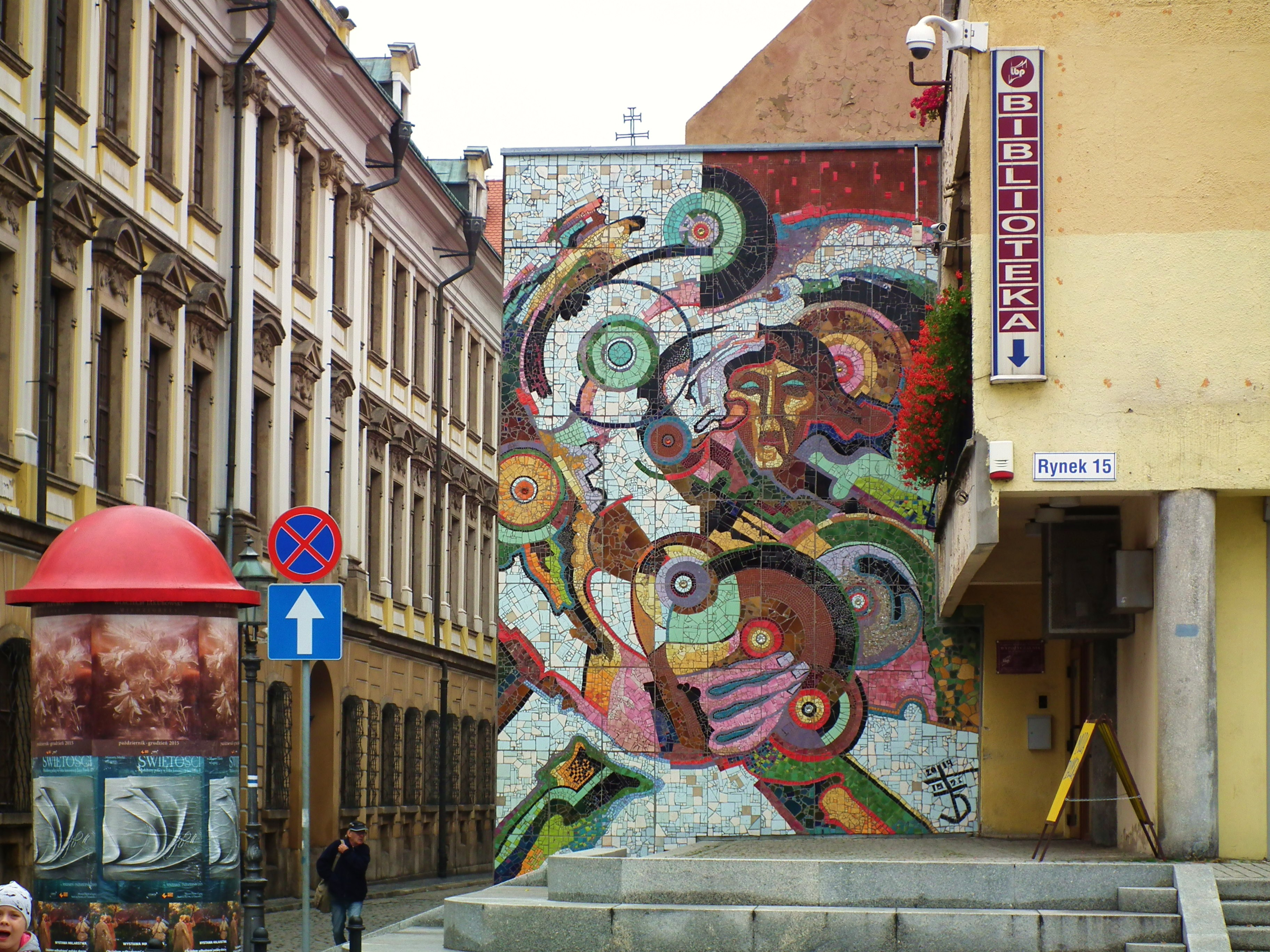
Nicolaus Copernicus mosaic on Market Square (1973)

== Economy ==
In the 1950s and 1960s, the local copper and nickel industries became a major factor in the economic development of the area. Legnica houses industrial plants belonging to KGHM Polska Miedź, one of the largest producers of copper and silver in the world. The company owns a large copper mill on the western outskirts of town. Legnica Special Economic Zone was established in 1997.

== Education ==
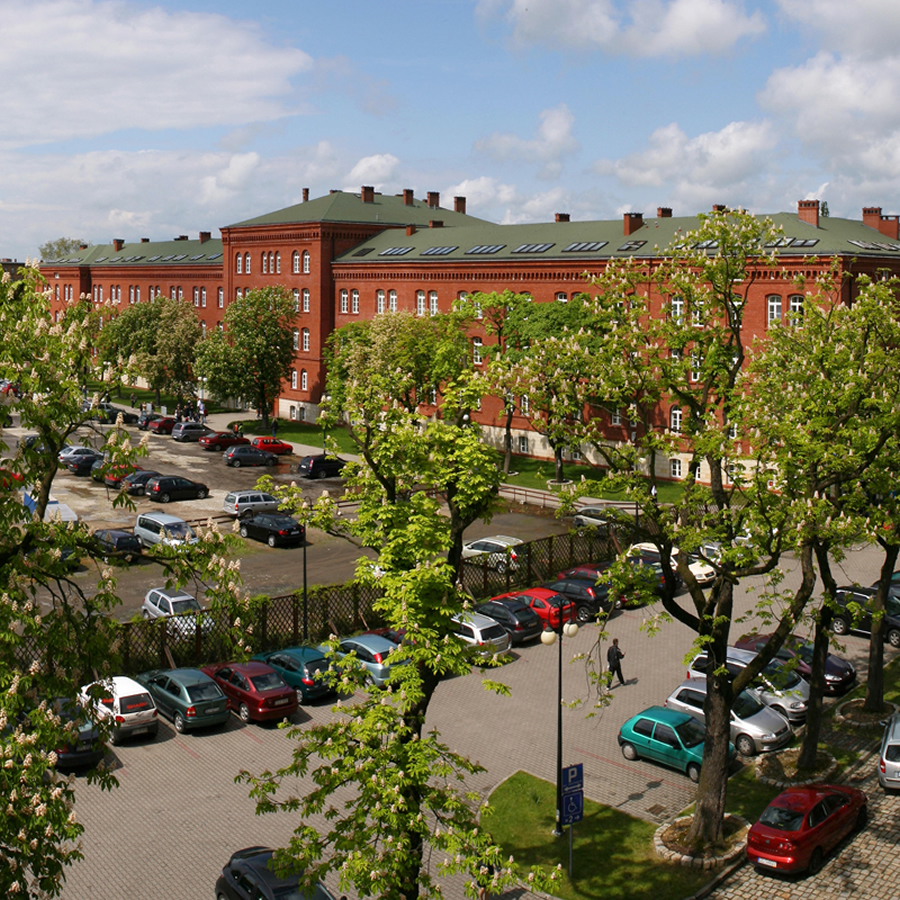
Witelon State University of Applied Sciences

Legnica is a regional academic center with seven universities enrolling approximately 16,000 students.

- State-run colleges and universities
  - Witelon University of Applied Sciences (Państwowa Wyższa Szkoła Zawodowa im. Witelona)
  - Wrocław University of Technology
  - Foreign Language Teacher Training College in Legnica
- Other
  - Wyższa Szkoła Zarządzania / The Polish Open University
  - Legnica University of Management
  - Wyższe Seminarium Duchowne / Seminary

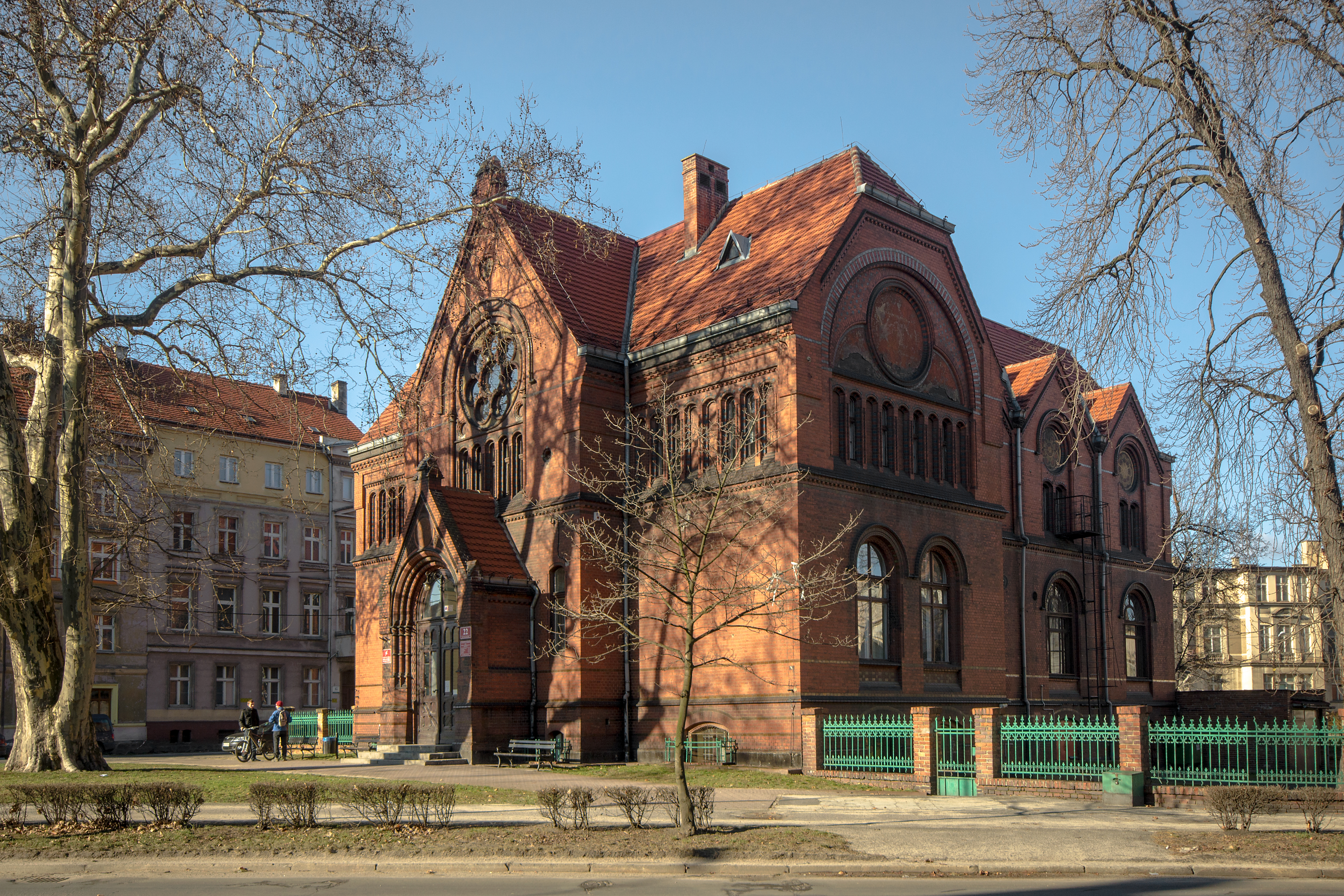
Legnica public library

== Environment ==
Legnica is noted for its parks and gardens, and has seven hundred hectares of green space, mostly along the banks of the Kaczawa; the Tarninow district is particularly attractive.

== Roads ==
To the south of Legnica is the A4 motorway. Legnica has also a district, which is a part of national road no 3. The express road S3 building has been planned nearby.

== Public transport ==
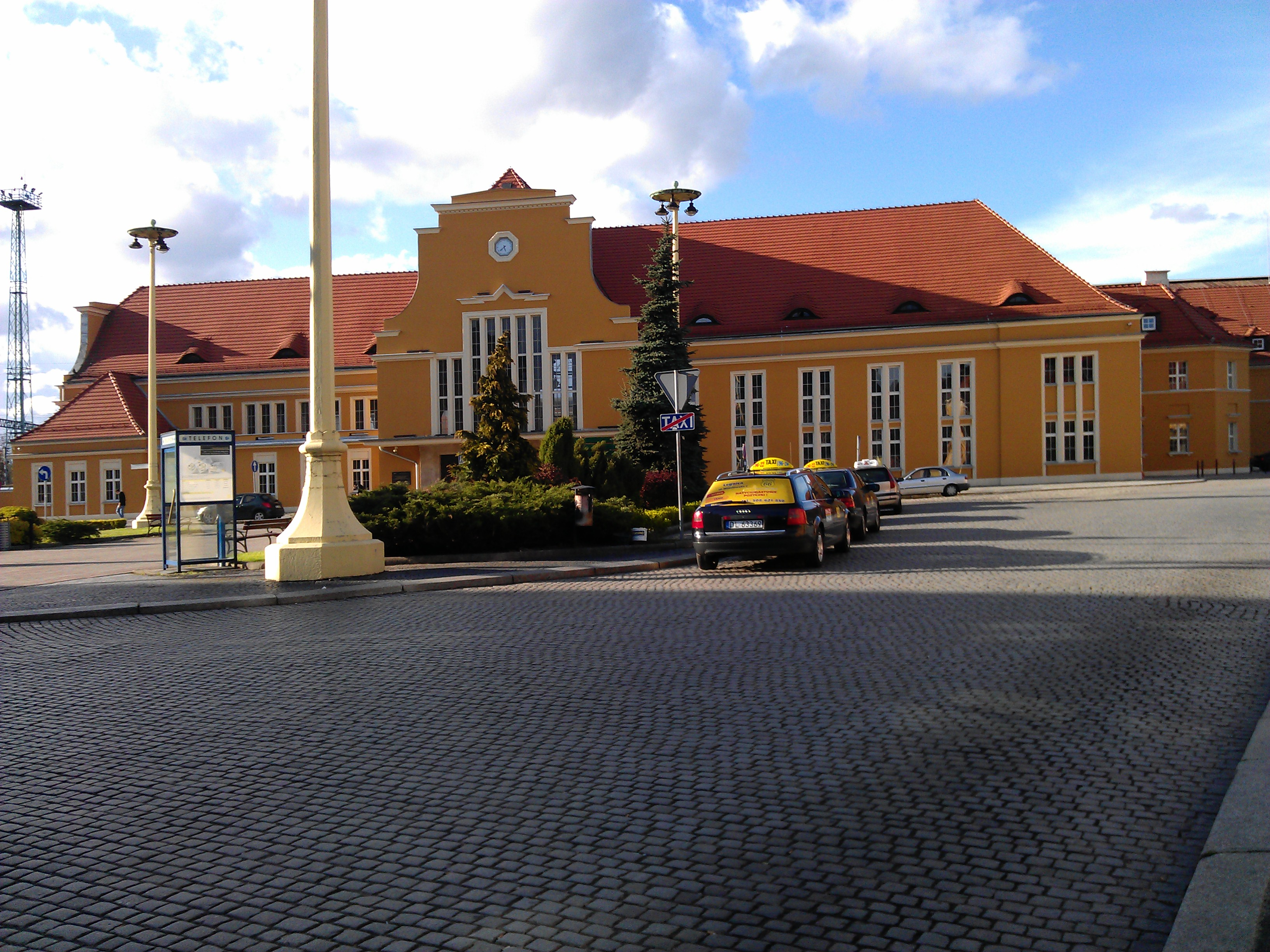
Legnica main railway station

In the city there are 20 regular bus lines, 1 belt-line, 2 night lines and 3 suburban.

The town has an airport (airport code EPLE) with a 1600-metre runway, the remains of a former Soviet air base, but it is (as of 2007) in a poor state and not used for commercial flights.

== Sports ==
- Miedź Legnica – men's football team (Polish Cup winner 1992; played in the Ekstraklasa in season 2018–19)
- White Eagle Municipal Stadium

== Eucharistic miracle ==
On Christmas day 2013, in the Church of Saint Hyacinth in Legnica, a priest dropped a consecrated Host on the floor. It was then put in a dish with water. After some time spent in the aforementioned dish, the Host partially dissolved, and a red substance appeared on it.

== Films produced in Legnica ==
In recent years Legnica has been frequently used as a film set for the following films as a result of its well preserved Old Town, proximity to Germany and low costs:

- Przebacz (dir. M. Stacharski) – 2005
- A Woman in Berlin (dir. M. Färberböck) – 2007
- Wilki (dir. F. Fromm) – 2007
- Little Moscow (dir. W. Krzystek) – 2008
- The Author of Himself: The Life of Marcel Reich-Ranicki (dir. D. Zahavi) – 2008
- Die Wölfe (dir. F. Fromm) – 2009
- Jack Strong (dir. W. Pasikowski) – 2014

== Politics ==
=== Municipal politics ===
Legnica tends to be a left-of-center town with a considerable influence of workers' unions. The Municipal Council of Legnica (Rada miejska miasta Legnica) is the legislative branch of the local government and is composed of 25 members elected in local elections every five years. The mayor or town president (Prezydent miasta) is the executive branch of the local government and is directly elected in the same municipal elections.

=== Legnica – Jelenia Góra constituency ===
Members of Parliament (Sejm) elected from Legnica-Jelenia Gora constituency:

- Ryszard Bonda, Samoobrona
- Bronisława Kowalska, SLD-UP
- Adam Lipiński, PiS
- Tadeusz Maćkała, PO
- Ryszard Maraszek, SLD-UP
- Olgierd Poniźnik, SLD-UP
- Władysław Rak, SLD-UP
- Tadeusz Samborski, PSL
- Jerzy Szmajdziński, SLD-UP
- Halina Szustak, LPR
- Michał Turkiewicz, SLD-UP
- Ryszard Zbrzyzny, SLD-UP

== Notable people ==
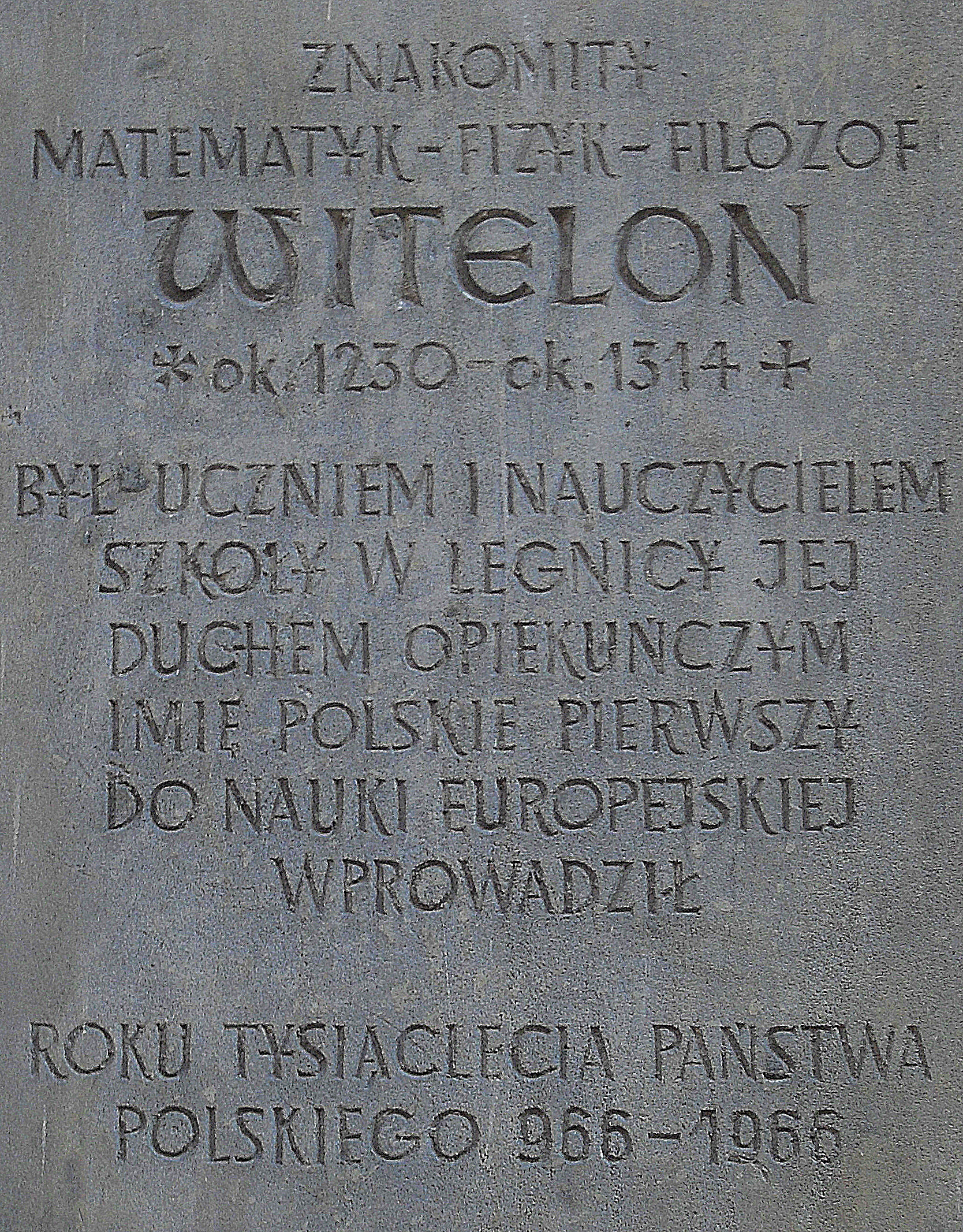
Memorial plaque to scientist and philosopher Witelo (Vitello) on the facade of the Copper Museum

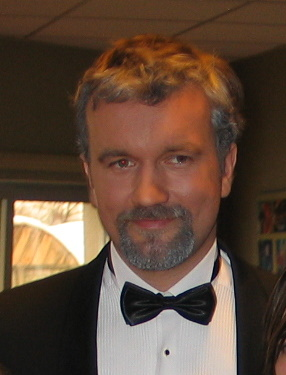
Tomasz Kot

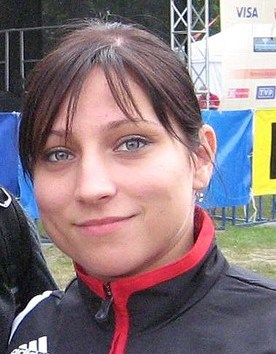
Aleksandra Klejnowska

- Henry II the Pious (1196/1207–1241), High Duke of Poland
- Witelo (Vitello; 1230–died 1280–1314), philosopher and scientist
- Bolesław II the Bald (1220–1278), High Duke of Poland
- Hans Aßmann Freiherr von Abschatz (1646–1699), lyricist and translator
- Georg Rudolf Böhmer (1723–1803), physician and botanist
- Johann Wilhelm Ritter (1776–1810), scientist, philosopher, discoverer of ultraviolet radiation
- Heinrich Wilhelm Dove (1803–1879) physicist
- Benjamin Bilse (1816–1902), conductor and composer
- Karl von Vogelsang (1818–1890), Catholic journalist, politician and social reformer
- Leopold Kronecker (1823–1891), mathematician
- Hugo Rühle (1824–1888), physician
- Gustav Winkler (1867–1954), textile manufacturer
- Wilhelm Schubart (1873–1960) classical philologist, historian and papyrologist
- Paul Löbe (1875–1967), social democratic politician
- Erich von Manstein (1887–1973), field marshal
- Hans Hayn (1896–1934), SA general and politician
- Gert Jeschonnek (1912–1999), an officer of the Navy, Vice Admiral, Chief of Navy
- Hans-Heinrich Jescheck (1915–2009), jurist
- Günter Reich (1921–1989), opera singer (baritone)
- Claus-Wilhelm Canaris (1937–2021), jurist and legal philosopher
- Uta Zapf (born 1941), politician (SPD), member of the Bundestag from 1990 to 2013
- Anna Dymna (born 1951), TV, film and theatre actress
- Jacek Oleksyn (born 1953), biologist
- Włodzimierz Juszczak (born 1957), bishop of the Eparchy of Wroclaw–Gdansk of the Ukrainian Greek Catholic Church
- Marzena Kipiel-Sztuka (born 1965), actress
- Beata Tadla (born 1975), journalist and TV presenter
- Konrad Wytrychowski (born 1976), retired Supreme Court jurist
- Tomasz Kot (born 1977), actor
- Marek Pająk (born 1977), musician
- Popek (born 1978), rapper and MMA fighter
- Mariusz Lewandowski (born 1979), football player
- Aleksandra Klejnowska (born 1982), weightlifter
- Marcin Robak (born 1982), football player
- Jagoda Szmytka (born 1982), composer
- Karol Welter (born 1995) professional boxer
- Jakub Popiwczak (born 1996), volleyball player
- Joanna Jarmołowicz (born 1994), actress
- Łukasz Poręba (born 2000), football player

== Twin towns – sister cities ==
Legnica is twinned with:

- Blansko, Czech Republic
- Drohobych, Ukraine
- Meissen, Germany
- Roanne, France
- Wuppertal, Germany

== In fiction ==
Legnica and its then ruler Count Conrad figure prominently in the alternate history series The Crosstime Engineer, set in the period of 1230 to 1270, by Leo Frankowski.
