= Scultetus Tenement House =

Historic building in Legnica, Poland

Coordinates: 51°12′34″N 16°09′53″E

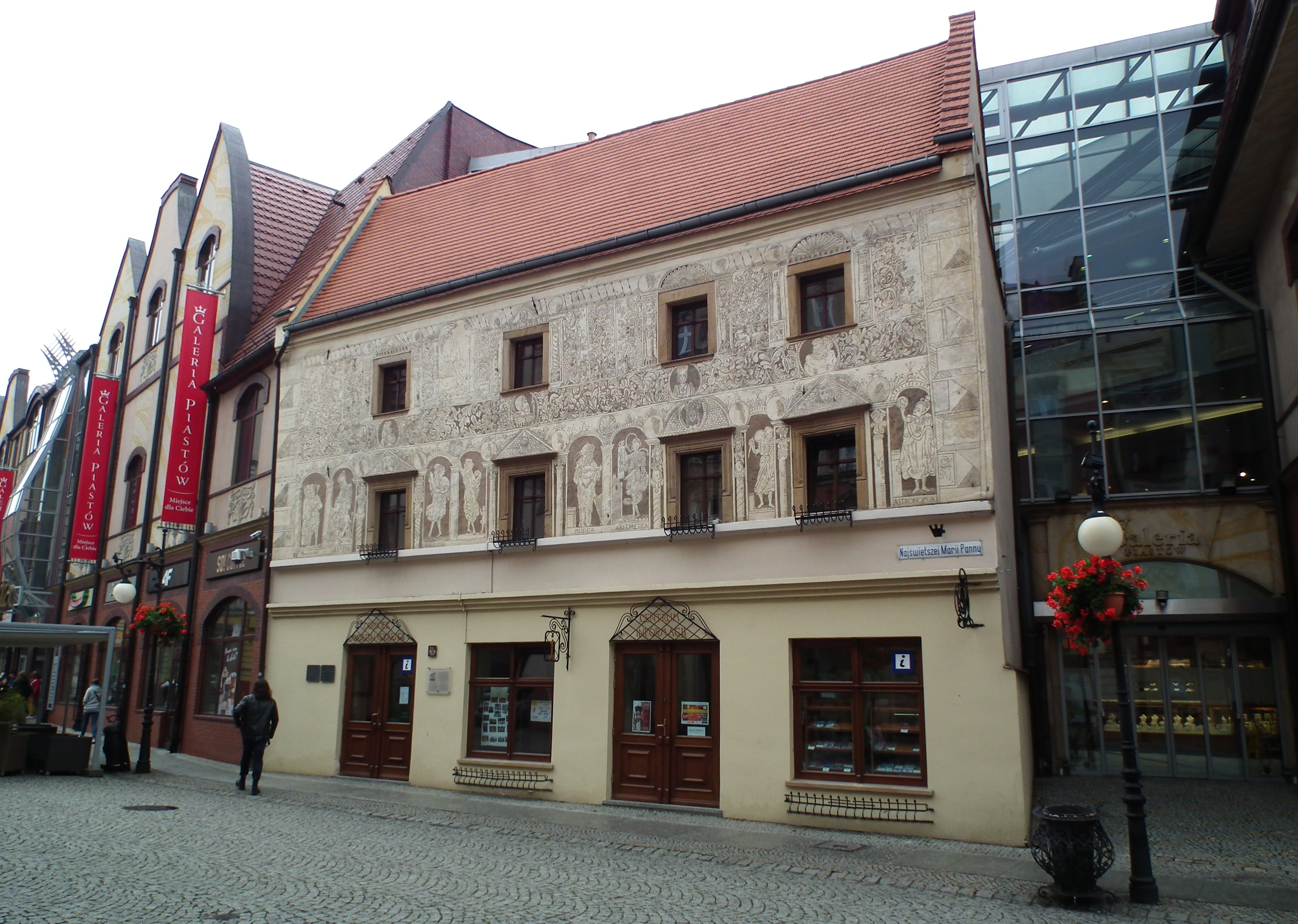
View from Blessed Virgin Mary Street (the Piast Gallery on both sides of the building)

The Scultetus (Scholz) Tenement House - a historic tenement house on Blessed Virgin Mary Street in Legnica, near the Piast Gallery.

The Renaissance building was built at the beginning of the fifteenth century. The two-zone sgraffito decoration on the façade comes from 1611 and presents geometric and architectural elements, as well as personifications of seven liberated arts - Grammar, Dialectics, Rhetoric, Music, Arithmetic, Astronomy and Geometry. The author of the decoration was master Giovanni together with his student - both of them are also included in the sgraffito. The work was covered with plaster at the end of the 19th century. In 1972 it was unveiled during conservation works. Originally the entire building was covered in sgraffito, however, only its upper part survived. In 2005–2006, the building was renovated with the financial support of the Erika Simon Foundation.

The tenement house was owned by Johann Scultetus (Hans Scholz) - a Legnica-based humanist, the rector of the school at the Church of Saints Peter and Paul since 1611. Currently the building is the seat of the Sports and Recreation Center. The city Tourist Information also has its office here.
