= Legnica Airport =

Former airfield in Poland

Legnica Airport Port Lotniczy Legnica
- IATA: none; ICAO: EPLE

Summary
- Airport type: Public
- Owner: SAG Legnica
- Serves: Legnica, Poland
- Coordinates: 51°10′59″N 16°10′46″E

Map
- Location of airport in Poland Legnica (Lower Silesian Voivodeship)

Runways
Direction	Length		Surface
Direction	m	ft	Surface
08/26	1,600	5,250	Concrete

Statistics (2007 +/- change from 2006)
- Passengers: 0
- Cargo (in tons): 0
- Takeoffs/landings: 0
- Source: Polish AIP at EUROCONTROL

Legnica Airport was a Polish airport in Legnica. It was initially a military airport before transitioning to a city-centre commercial airport in the 1990s. While in operation, it had a runway length of 1,600 metres (5,200 ft), with a width 40 metres (130 ft)

== History ==
Before World War II, the airport operated as a hub for Zeppelins. After the war, it was taken over by the Soviet Armed Forces (its Northern Group of Forces) and used for military purposes until the early 1990s.

Any expansion was deemed to be a costly proposition since a nearby railway line would need to be rerouted into an underground tunnel, and even after that because of the short runway the airfield would only be really useful as an inner city airport, akin to Mannheim Airport or London City Airport.

Officially closed in 2015, the airport no longer exists. The area has become an industrial estate, including factories of the German company Viessmann have been constructed on the former plot of land.

== Airport infrastructure ==
There is a railroad line near the terminal that could have been used for passenger service.
