= Eucharistic miracle of Legnica =

2013 Polish Eucharistic miracle

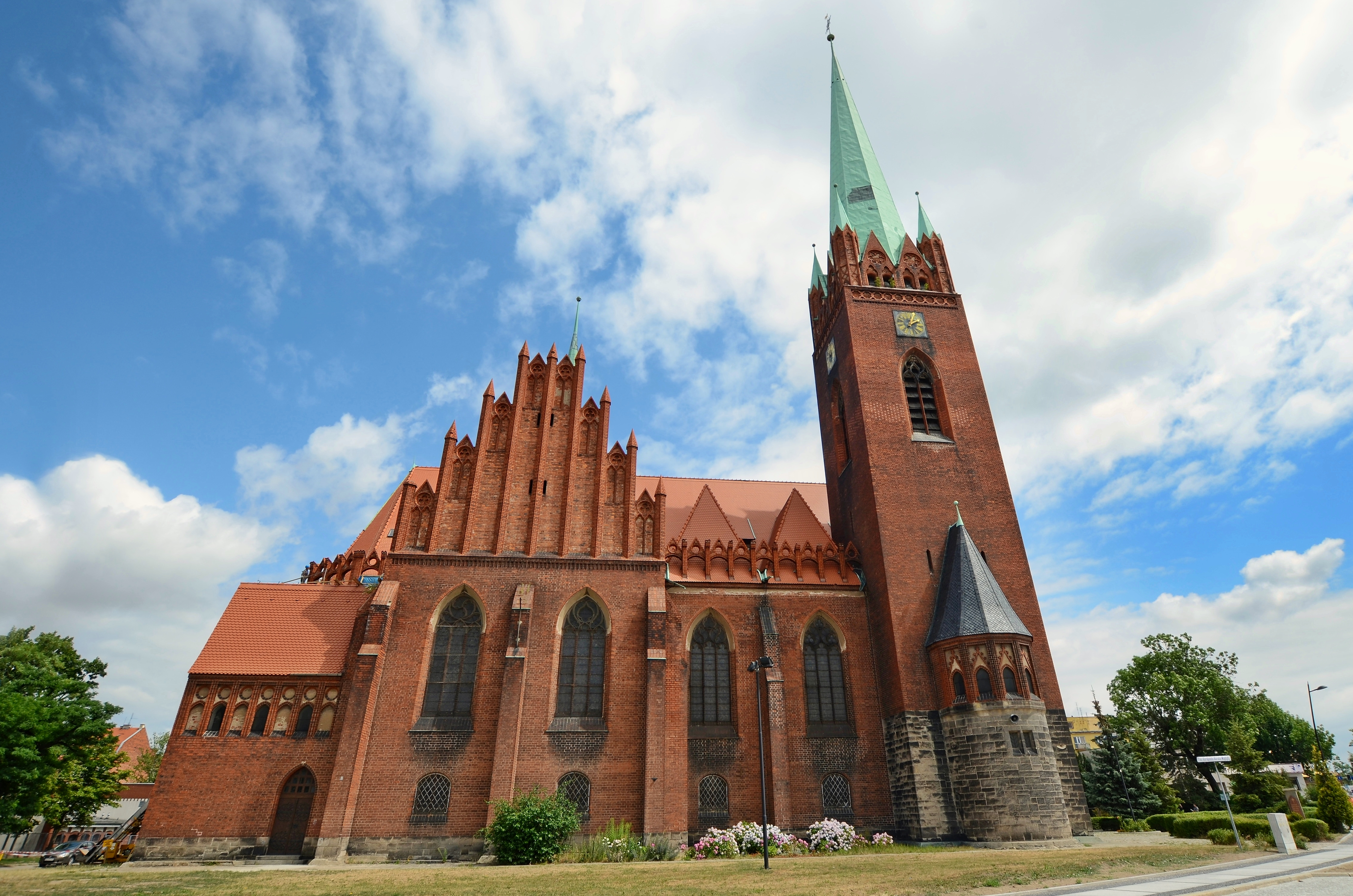
- Church of Saint Hyacinth

Information
- Type: Eucharistic miracle
- Date: 25th December, 2013
- Denomination: Catholic

Location
- Location: Church of Saint Hyacinth in Legnica
- Country: Poland
- City: Legnica
- Diocese: Diocese of Legnica

The Eucharistic miracle of Legnica is a purported eucharistic miracle that took place on December 25th, 2013. A red substance appeared on a consecrated host that was left in a dish with water.

== Event ==
In 2013, on Christmas day, around 8:45AM, a vicar administering communion to an altar server accidentally dropped a consecrated host on the floor. The host, was quickly picked up from the floor and was placed in a dish with hot tap water. After two weeks, priest Tadeusz Kisiński noticed that the host partially dissolved and a red discoloration sized roughly 1.5x0.5cm appeared on it. Parish priest Andrzej Ziombra informed Stefan Cichy of the event. On 16th January, 2014, a committee was appointed to study the event. 2 days later, the committee arrived in Sokółka, where a similar alleged miracle phenomenon took place. On 21st January, the Diocese of Legnica commissioned a scientific investigation of the material. The results of the analysis supposedly ruled out bacterial and mycological contamination. In the same year, a piece of the miraculous host was subjected to additional analysis. The report of the evaluation concluded that the analysed substance was suggested to be cardiac muscle tissue and that the DNA found on the host is human.

Further research was commissioned on 25th of June, 2015, where the presence of human tissue was said to be confirmed on 9th of December, 2015.

== Investigation and criticism ==
The host first underwent analysis in Wrocław with results failing to conclusively determine the source of the red colouration. The second examination was performed by the Department of Forensic Medicine in Szczecin, where it was reported the "fibers were very similar to heart muscle, but also that what surrounded them was connective tissue". The situation bore striking resemblance to an incident at St. Anthony's Church in Sokółka in October 2008.

It was revealed that the images were hard to identify and the material proved very difficult to study, but the histological images taken from Wrocław showed fibrous structures resembling cardiac muscles according to Dr Barbara Engel, and further tests were necessary. No DNA or human derivatives were found on the host, while mycelium and fungal growth was identified. Szczecin later asserted in their observations of the same slides that the red substance was heart muscle tissue. One of the methods used to determine if the substance is heart muscle tissue was observation under a UV microscope with an orange filter. According to Bóg przemówił w Legnicy, a Catholic devotional publication, mitochondrial sequencing showed that the DNA found was human, and microbiological testing was claimed to have only found the presence of normal environmental bacteria.

Zbigniew Kiernikowski the Bishop of Legnica had stated in an announcement, that in the opinion of the Department of Forensic Medicine in Szczecin:

The histopathological image revealed tissue fragments containing fragmented parts of striated muscle. [...] The overall image [...] is most similar to cardiac muscle [...] with changes that "often accompany agony." Genetic testing indicates that the tissue is of human origin.

Skeptical scientists have argued that the red substance is not human tissue, but could be related to Serratia marcescens. It is a species of very common bacteria that has the ability to grow on bread and produce a red pigment. The bacterium is indicated as the most probable explanation for the "miracles" at Sokółka and Legnica according to Martyna Franczuk, a biotechnologist from the Medical University of Gdańsk:

The blood bacillus is ubiquitous, occurring in human environments. It often thrives on starchy foods, such as those made from flour. It prefers moist and cool places,

The hosts used in liturgy are made of flour and water. If they fall to the ground, and are placed in a container of water, these are ideal conditions for the growth of bacteria, producing a red pigment that closely resembles blood. She also noted that it is possible Serratia marcescens cannot produce red pigment in temperatures above 30 degrees Celsius, making them invisible. Franczuk had additionally said:

I find it hard to believe that an experienced histopathologist could confuse Serratia marcescens bacteria cells with very distinctive human cells, which are also much larger.

She had asked the Legnica Curia for detailed information about the research carried out, but was still left waiting for a response. In 2016, there was an interview featuring Tadeusz Dobosz, who was involved in the original Wrocław assessment. He claimed to have personally performed the genetic testing on the red substance and host in which they found no human DNA, and Dobosz reiterated that they observed various types of fungal hyphae and mycelium alongside unidentifiable autolyzed fibers. He stated that any traces of genetic material would have been from trace handling contamination because of how sensitive modern PCR methods are. Dobosz also said the reason the parish priest went to ask the individuals at Szczecin after his results at Wrocław, was because the priest deemed his conclusions "unsatisfactory". In 2025, Dobosz co-authored a study on peri-eucharist phenomenon, which discovered a wide variety of microbial species are capable of producing red, pink, and orange-red pigments. The fibrous structures were largely created by the putrefaction and decomposition of fungi and microorganisms, while others require further investigation. The study noted that partial results from prior investigations referenced in devotional literature had frequently omitted standard analytical procedures or ignored contradictory evidence, resulting in premature conclusions directed at the general public that could have been avoided through stricter scientific rigor.

== Impact ==
Fr. Andrzej Ziombra, parish priest of Church of Saint Hyacinth in Legnica, said that the miraculous event led to many conversions, including that of a member of the local community previously hostile to the Church. He said that, as a result of the miracle, Legnica had become a pilgrimage destination for people from all over the world.

Anna Królikowska a sociologist, included the events of Sokółka and Legnica as examples of institutionalized "miracular sensitivity" in contemporary Poland. Królikowska argues the Catholic Church uses these narratives of supernatural signs and intervention to reinforce its media and cultural presence, in an increasingly secularized society. From an ethnographic perspective, anthropologist Tomasz Kalnuik notes that the events transformed the industrial town into a major pilgrimage site attracting tourists, and revitalized traditional "folk religiosity" in the area and sensory-focused Catholic devotion. He argued the vitality of the alleged miracle at the time in an urban context, challenges theories of inevitable secularization within Polish culture.

== See also ==
- Carlo Acutis
- Church of Saint Hyacinth in Legnica
- Eucharistic miracle of Sokółka
- Legnica
- List of Eucharistic miracles
