= List of Eucharistic miracles =

Eucharistic miracles are miracles which, particularly in the Catholic Church, involve claimed supernatural phenomena occurring with the Eucharistic host. This article contains lists of these miracles.

Carlo Acutis, a 15-year-old Catholic who developed an early interest in computers and video games, became known for cataloging over 150 Eucharistic miracles that were said to occur in different countries. He became a canonized Catholic saint on 7 September 2025. Writing guidance notes for the Acutis exhibition, Raffaello Martinelli, former official at the Congregation for the Doctrine of the Faith states that Catholics are "not obliged to believe", but miracles can be "useful and fruitful aids to religious faith." The exhibition website does not claim miracles have been scientifically validated, nor does it cite peer-reviewed studies or scientific research as confirmation. Other Catholic scientists cautioned that "a careful appraisal both for and against the scientific claims is necessary."

== List of miracles ==
Carlo Acutis listed over 150 Eucharistic miracles during his lifetime. The following list includes most of these miracles, as well as those not listed by him. This list includes events with positive judgments and events with no judgments by Catholic Church authorities.

Miracle City	Year	Country	Summary	Notes
Buenos Aires	1992-1994-1996	Argentina	Bleeding Host	
Fiecht	1310	Austria	Wine turns into blood boils overflows chalice, doubting priest	
Seefeld	1384	Austria	Earthquake at same time as bleeding host	
Weiten-Raxendorf	1411	Austria	Glowing Host	
Bois-Seigneur-Isaac	1405	Belgium	Bleeding Host	
Bruges	1203	Belgium	Relic of Jesus blood	
Brussels	1370	Belgium	Bleeding Host; Stolen Host. Related to the Brussels massacre	
Herentals	1412	Belgium	Stolen Hosts intact after eight days in form of cross	
Herkenrode-Hasselt	1317	Belgium	Bleeding Host	
Liège	1374	Belgium	Led to Feast of Corpus Christi	
Middleburg-Lovanio	1374	Belgium	Bleeding Host	
Aalst	2016	Belgium	Bleeding Host	
Tumaco	1906	Colombia	Island saved by Blessed Sacrament	
Ludbreg	1411	Croatia	Wine turned to blood	
Scete	3rd-4th cent.	Egypt	Infant Jesus seen in place of bread	
St. Mary of Egypt	4th-5th cent.	Egypt	Bishop writes of a saint (Mary of Egypt) who had walked on water to receive communion	
Avignon	1433	France	Eucharist Survives flood	
Blanot	1331	France	Bleeding Host	
Bordeaux	1822	France	Jesus appears in Host	
Dijon	1430	France	Bleeding Host	
Douai	1254	France	Child appears after Host dropped	
Faverney	1608	France	Fire destroys altar but not Host	
La Rochelle	1461	France	Host cures paralyzed boy	
Les Ulmes	1668	France	Host replaced by man	
Marseille-En-Beauvais	1533	France	Stolen Hosts found in perfect condition	
Neuvy Saint Sepulcre	1257	France	Host cures paralyzed boy	
Paris	1290	France	Host stolen and returned.	
Pressac	1643	France	Host survives fire	
Augsburg	1194	Germany	Bleeding Host	
Benningen	1216	Germany	Bleeding Host	
Bettbrunn	1125	Germany	Stolen Host could not be picked up until Bishop's prayer	
Erding	1417	Germany	Stolen Host found	
Kranenburg	1280	Germany	Host thrown near tree, tree forms crucifix	
Regensburg	1255	Germany	The Lord takes Host from doubting priest	
Walldürn	1330	Germany	Wine turned into blood in form of Crucified Christ	
Wilsnack	1383	Germany	Host survives fire. Called the Holy Blood of Wilsnack	
Weingarten	1094	Germany	Relic of Jesus blood	
Gracias	2022	Honduras	Bleeding corporal	
Alatri	1228	Italy	Host stolen and becomes flesh	
Asti	1535	Italy	Bleeding Host	
Bagno di Romagna	1412	Italy	Bleeding Host; Doubting priest	
Bolsena	1264	Italy	Host turns into Flesh. Pope and Thomas Aquinas witness host. A related relic is the Corporal of Bolsena.	
Canosio	1630	Italy	Flood stops; Priest with Eucharist prayed at flood waters	
Cascia	1330	Italy	Bleeding Host	
Cava dei Tirreni	1656	Italy	Plague stopped by Eucharistic procession	
Dronero	1631	Italy	Fire stopped; Priest with Eucharist prayed at fire	
Ferrara	1171	Italy	Bleeding Host; stains ceiling	
Florence	1230	Italy	Wine becomes blood	
Florence	1595	Italy	Eucharist survives fire	
Gruaro (Valvasone)	1294	Italy	Bleeding Host	
Lanciano	750	Italy	Host turns to flesh; Wine into Blood. Doubting priest. Referred to as the Eucharistic miracle of Lanciano	
Macerata	1356	Italy	Bleeding Host; Doubting priest	
Mogoro	1604	Italy	Sinful men spit out Host; Hosts became hot, leaves imprint on floor	
Morrovalle	1560	Italy	Hosts survive fire	
Offida	1273	Italy	Host becomes flesh after attempt to use in witchcraft	
Patierno (Naples)	1772	Italy	Stolen Hosts found	
Rimini	1227	Italy	St. Anthony wagers with disbeliever that starving mule will pick Host to food	
Rome	1610	Italy	Host becomes flesh	
Rome	6th-7th cent.	Italy	Host becomes flesh	
Rosano	1948	Italy	Host leaves imprint on floor; Doubting priest	
Fonte Avellana	11th Century	Italy	Host turns to flesh; was to be used in witchcraft; witnessed by St. Peter Damian	
Assisi	1240	Italy	St. Clare turns away invaders by displaying Eucharist	
Salzano	1517	Italy	Priest gives Viaticum; donkeys led procession and genuflect	
San Mauro La Bruca	1969	Italy	Stolen Host found	
Scala	1732	Italy	Signs of Passion appear in Host	
Siena	1730	Italy	Consecrated Hosts intact for 276 years, unconsecrated hosts rot away	
Trani	11th Century	Italy	Bleeding Host. Stolen, thief tries to fry Host, Host bleeds	
Turin	1453	Italy	Stolen Host and Monstrance rise; later Host becomes illuminated	
Turin	1640	Italy	Attempt to steal host prevented by flames	
Veroli	1570	Italy	Jesus appears in Host	
Volterra	1472	Italy	Stolen Hosts; Hosts rise and illuminated	
Chirattakonam	2001	India	Image of Christ appears on the Host	
Kerala	2013	India	Host displayed image of Jesus	
Chümoukedima, Nagaland	2024	India	Blood oozed out from host	
Morne-Rouge	1902	Martinique	Town survives volcano; Afterwards image Jesus in Host	
Tixtla	2006	Mexico	Bleeding Host	
Guadalajara	2013	Mexico	Bleeding Host along with religious experience	
Alkmaar	1429	Netherlands	Wine turns to blood	
Amsterdam	1345	Netherlands	Host survives vomiting and fire	
Bergen	1421	Netherlands	Doubting priest throws Hosts in river. Hosts found Bleeding	
Boxmeer	1400	Netherlands	Wine turned into blood	
Boxtel-Hoogstraten	1380	Netherlands	Wine turned into blood	
Breda-Niervaart	1300	Netherlands	Stolen Host found in perfect condition	
Meerssen	1222	Netherlands	Bleeding Host	
Meerssen	1465	Netherlands	Host Rescued from fire	
Stiphout	1342	Netherlands	Host survives fire	
Eten	1649	Peru	Jesus appears in Host	
Glotowo	1290	Poland	Buried Host found illuminated	
Kraków	1345	Poland	Stolen Host found illuminated	
Legnica	2013	Poland	Bleeding Host. Referred to as the Eucharistic miracle of Legnica	
Poznań	1399	Poland	Stolen and destroyed Host; Found Particles illuminated	
Sokółka	2008	Poland	Bleeding Host. Referred to as the Eucharistic miracle of Sokółka	
Santarém	1247	Portugal	Bleeding Host turns to flesh. Referred to as the Eucharistic miracle of Santarém	
Saint-André de la Réunion	1902	Reunion Islands	Face of Jesus appears in Host	
Alboraya-Almacéra	1348	Spain	Host dropped in river; saved by fish	
Alcalà	1597	Spain	Stolen Hosts returned; Host intact after 11 years	
Alcoy	1568	Spain	Stolen Hosts found	
Caravaca de la Cruz	1231	Spain	Image of Jesus in Host; Muslim king converts	
Cimballa	1370	Spain	Bleeding Host; doubting priest	
Daroca	1239	Spain	Bleeding Host; Led to military victory	
Gerona	1297	Spain	Bleeding Host; Doubting priest; Priest could not swallow Host.	
Gorkum-El Escorial	1572	Spain	Bleeding Host. Desecrated before bleeding	
Guadalupe	1420	Spain	Bleeding Host	
Ivorra	1010	Spain	Wine into Blood. Doubting Priest	
Moncada	1392	Spain	Girl wants to play with Jesus; Priest doubts ordination	
Montserrat	1657	Spain	During consecration girl sees father in purgatory surrounded by flames; tissue ignites	
O'Cebreiro	1300	Spain	Host to flesh; doubting priest	
Onil	1824	Spain	Stolen Host found	
Ponferrada	1533	Spain	Stolen Host found. Tabernacle stolen.	
S. John of the Abbesses	1251	Spain	Stolen Host; Jesus image in Host	
Silla	1907	Spain	Stolen Hosts found in perfect condition	
Valencia	33	Spain	Chalice used by Jesus in his Last Supper	
Zaragoza	1427	Spain	Stolen Host; Image of Jesus in Host	
Ettiswil	1447	Switzerland	Stolen Host found lighted in seven pieces in air in form of flower	
Thomaston	2023	United States	Duplicating Host	
Betania	1991	Venezuela	Bleeding Host	

=== Legacy of the Acutis list ===
The listed miracles by Acutis have toured many places around the world, and were exhibited across the Archdiocese of Detroit, especially Dearborn. Children were inspired by the compiled lists that helped them to "grow closer to the Lord in the Blessed Sacrament." In Our Lady of Pity's Church, Staten Island, New York, the internationally renowned "Eucharist Miracles of the World" exhibition featured 75 panels that showcase the miracles from around the world. This was considered an "inspiring testament to faith and devotion." It holds special significance to the canonization of Carlo Acutis.

However, Church historian Alessandro Serra has questioned the individual attribution of the exhibition to Acutis. Serra noted the exhibition's first catalogue, published in 2006 with a preface by Angelo Comastri, was credited to Sergio Meloni and Istituto San Clemente I Papa e Martire—an association founded by the Acutis family that was later absorbed by the association dedicated to Acutis. Subsequent editions of the catalogue featured identical content, but omitted Sergio Meloni's name, instead attributing the design and curation of the exhibit solely to Acutis. Serra claimed this narrative was shaped by Acutis' mother Antonia Salzano, noting she has the domain name for the exhibition website.

== List of miracle claims rejected by Church authorities ==
In the modern era, the Catholic Church's process of discerning miracle claims can conclude that an event was naturally caused. John S. Bonnici in an interview explained that sometimes the Vatican is consulted for cases, but the final decision is always with the local bishop. Robert Spitzer had advocated for a more defined procedure to remedy this problem, as dioses in different parts of the world do not follow a uniform way to scientifically investigate alleged miracles.

This list includes miracle claims both outright rejected by the Church, along with cases where a relevant Church authority explicitly declined to investigate a case or deemed them invalid.

Miracle City	Year	Country	Summary	Notes
Naju	1995-2006	Korea	An excomunicated mystic Julia Kim the seer of Our Lady of Naju, claimed to be able to turn multiple hosts into flesh and blood within her mouth. Nine samples were taken from her "miraculous hosts" that occurred throughout the years, being analysed by Humanpass Inc, a laboratory in South Korea. Results revealed the blood used on the various hosts came from a Korean individual, with a 75% match with East Asia in the ethnicity DNA profile.	
Oak Cliff	2006	United States	Bleeding Host	
South St. Paul	2011	United States	In the process of dissolving a discarded consecrated host in water, red coloration was noticed. The Archdiocese of Saint Paul and Minneapolis found the cause to be fungus.	
Kearns	2015	United States	A consecrated host appeared to bleed. An investigation by the Diocese of Salt Lake City concluded that "red bread mold" naturally caused the coloration.	
Buffalo	2018	United States	A red coloration was noticed on a host. Bishops of the Diocese of Buffalo declined to investigate.	
Morris	2025	United States	Spots thought to be blood found on two discarded consecrated hosts. Laboratory analysis showed that these were caused by natural bacteria.	

== See also ==
- Eucharistic miracle
- List of Marian apparitions
