= Yakov Romas =

Soviet painter (1902–1969)

Yakov Dorofeyevich Romas
- Born: 1902; Sokółka, Poland
- Died: 1969 (aged 66–67); Astrakhan, Soviet Union
- Known for: Painting

Yakov Romas (1902-1969) was a Soviet painter, and a People's Artist of the USSR. His paintings include Morning on the Outskirts of Moscow (1947) and In the Southern Port of Moscow (1949).
