= Eucharistic miracle of Tixtla =

Eucharistic miracle that took place in 2006

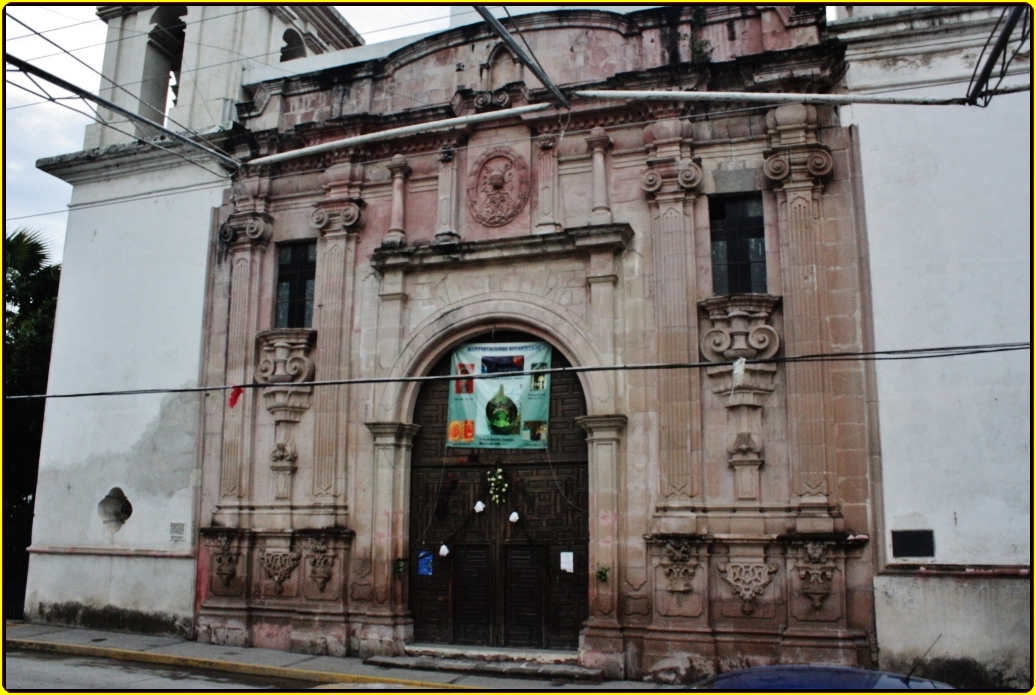
- St. Martin of Tours parish in Tixtla

Information
- Type: Eucharistic miracle
- Date: October 21, 2006
- Denomination: Catholic

Location
- Location: St. Martin of Tours parish, Tixtla
- Country: Mexico
- City: Tixtla, Guerrero
- Diocese: Diocese of Chilpancingo-Chilapa

The Eucharistic miracle of Tixtla is a claimed Eucharistic miracle that was said to have occurred on October 21, 2006, in the Mexican town of Tixtla, Guerrero, where a consecrated Host began to bleed in the hands of a nun during the distribution of Communion.

== Event ==
On October 21, 2006, the parish of St. Martin of Tours in Tixtla held a retreat, at which, around 600 people were present. A nun was distributing Communion with two priests during the retreat. At one point, she suddenly turned to face one of the priests, with tears in her eyes, realizing the Host she was holding had begun to bleed. Some sources also claim that the Host did not begin to bleed in her hands, but rather began to bleed while in a ciborium. Unsure about what to do, the priests informed bishop Alejo Zavala Castro, who immediately came to see the Host and later formed a theological commission to study the event and determine whether or not it was a hoax of some kind. After 3 years, the priest decided to have scientific research conducted on the host, which was done between 2009 and 2012. The investigation supposedly confirmed the red substance which originally appeared on the Host is human blood of type AB, the same blood type that some claim is found on the Shroud of Turin. Further microscopic analysis allegedly showed that while the exterior layer of blood had coagulated, the inner layer had remained fresh and alive with intact white blood cells, red blood cells and macrophages. The tissue was also said to have been identified as myocardium. On October 12, 2013, the bishop declared the event in Tixtla was a miracle; however, it has not yet been approved by the Vatican.

Kelly P. Kearse and Frank Ligaj in their critical review of peri-eucharist phenomenon highlighted risks of false positives, and noted that little to no details were provided for such tests, other than the supposed results. According to Kearse and Ligaj, the original investigators in their descriptions omitted essential controls, and reports of cardiac tissue relied solely on visual inspection. While the sample tested positive for a certain marker anti-glycophorin A, it tested negative for muscle-specific markers as well as being Rh negative—which they saw as a contradiction. Additionally, the acknowledgement of plant cells by the original investigation went unanalysed. Kearse indicated that the Tixtla host was handled by multiple people over seven years it took to investigate, and that "it is reasonable to propose that shared AB antigens from bacteria could readily explain the observed shared blood type" and a "very low concentration of human DNA" is indicative of handling contamination.

== Connection to St. Carlo Acutis ==
The event in Tixtla is considered by believers to be correlated with Carlo Acutis. He had a particular devotion to the Eucharist and to Eucharistic miracles, and a worldwide exhibition about them was made in memory of him and his findings. Shortly before Carlo's death, it was said that his mother Antonia Salzano, asked him to, when he arrives in Heaven, ask Jesus for more Eucharistic miracles. The event took place only nine days after his death, which is given divine attribution by the faithful.

== See also ==
- List of Eucharistic miracles
- Private revelation
- Serratia marcescens
- Transubstantiation
