= Church of Saint Hyacinth in Legnica =

Neo-Gothic church in Legnica, Poland

- Kościół św. Jacka w Legnicy
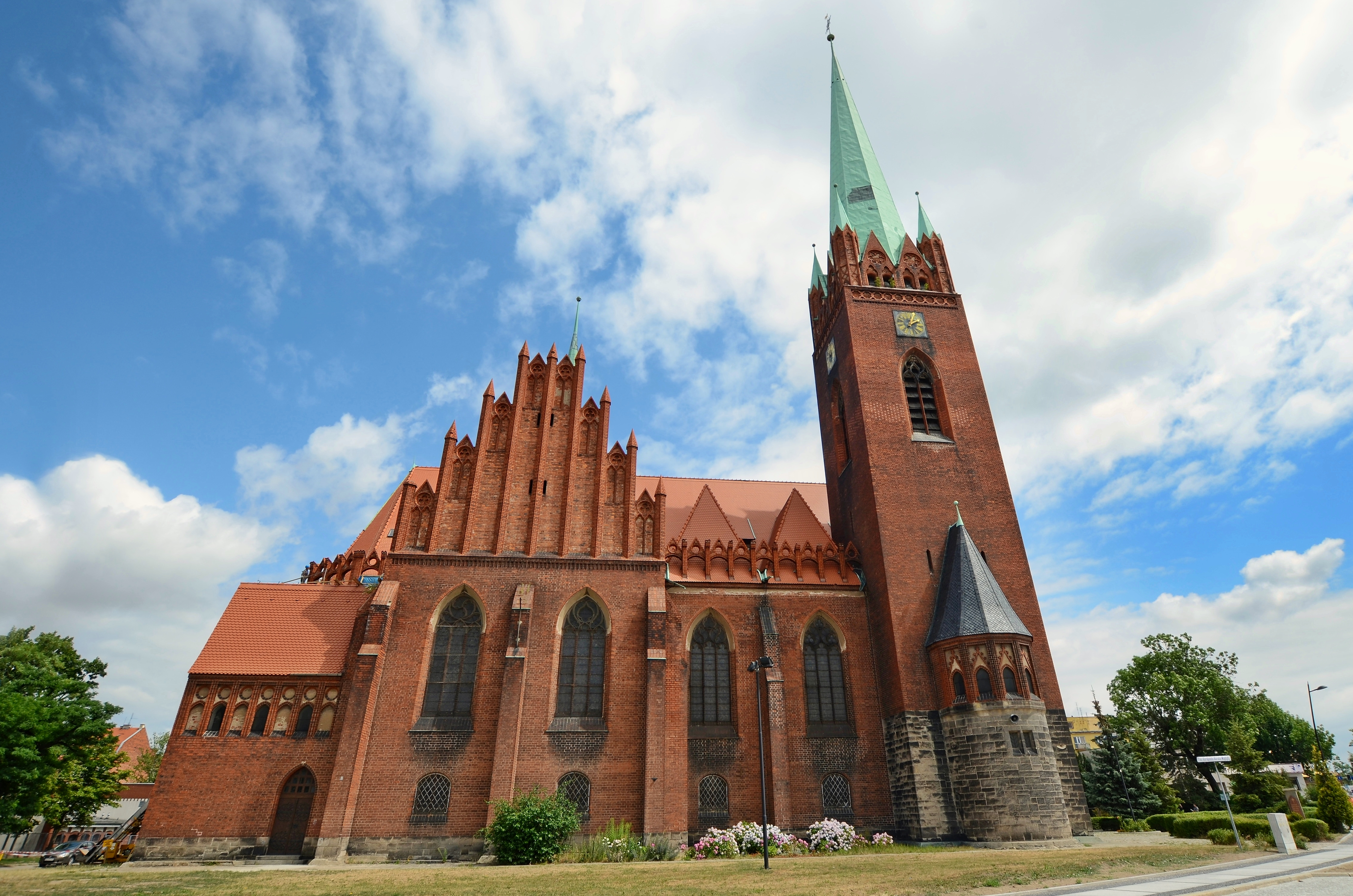
- Church of St. Hyacinth

- Location within Poland
- 51.210452°N 16.173424°E
- Location: Legnica, Poland
- Address: Nadbrzeżna 3, 59-220 Legnica
- Denomination: Roman Catholic

Architecture
- Style: Neogothic

Administration
- Diocese: Diocese of Legnica

The Church of St. Hyacinth in Legnica is Roman Catholic, neogothic Parish church built in the year 1908. It was originally a Protestant church.

== History ==
When the Red Army captured Legnica in 1945, the soldiers used the church building as a stable. Later, the building was renovated and became a Catholic parish church in 1968, until 1945, it was Protestant.

In 1977, the parish got permission to build a rectory, its roof was finished in 1979.

== Eucharistic miracle ==
A purported miracle similar to that of Sokółka is believed to have taken place in Legnica. On Christmas 2013, a priest dropped a consecrated host on the floor, which was then placed into a dish with holy water to dissolve. After two weeks, a red substance appeared on the host.

== See also ==
- Eucharistic miracle
- Saint Anthony of Padua Church in Sokółka
