= Saint Anthony of Padua Church in Sokółka =

Church in Sokółka

Church of Saint Anthony of Padua in Sokółka
- Kolegiata św. Antoniego w Sokółce
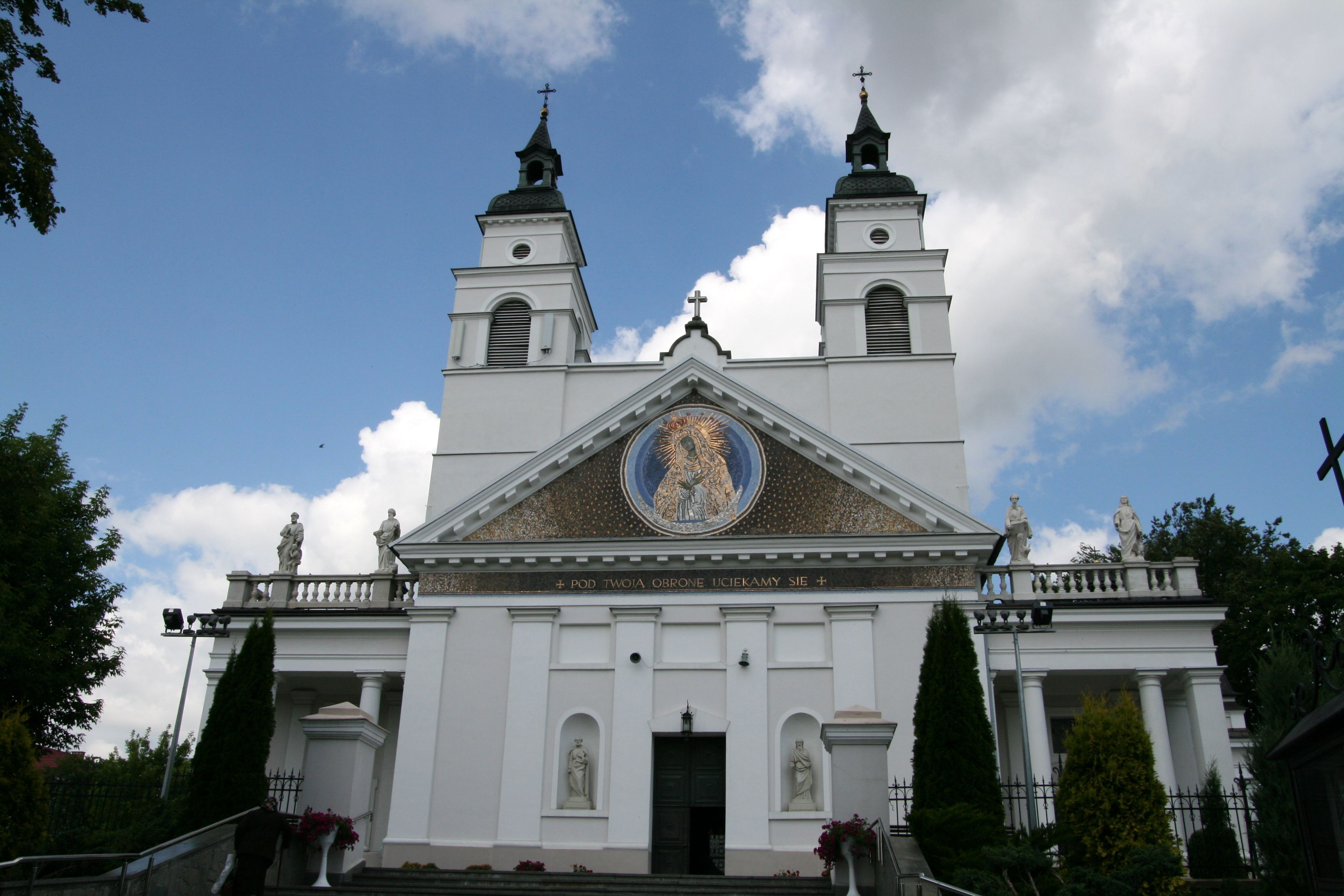
- Front of the church

- Location within Poland
- 53.407461°N 23.504175°E
- Location: Sokółka, Poland
- Address: Grodzieńska 47, 16-100 Sokółka
- Country: Poland
- Denomination: Roman Catholic

Architecture
- Style: Classicism

Specifications
- Materials: Bricks

Administration
- Diocese: Archdiocese of Białystok

The Saint Anthony of Padua Church in Sokółka is a Roman Catholic sanctuary built in 1840-1848.

== History ==
The church of Saint Anthony of Padua was consecrated on the 9th of June, 1850. Between 1901 and 1904, a sacristy, two extra naves and chapels and other rooms were built by priest Anzelm Noniewic.

The building did not suffer major damages during the Second World War and was renovated after the war. New wooden benches were installed and the Organ was replaced. An electrical installation was installed after the war.

== Eucharistic miracle ==
A Eucharistic miracle was said to have occurred at this church in 2008. A priest dropped a consecrated host, which was then, placed in a dish with water. After a week in the water, a red substance appeared on the host. A similar miracle was alleged to have taken place in Legnica, inside the Church of Saint Hyacinth in Legnica.

== See also ==
- Carlo Acutis
- List of Eucharistic miracles
