= Ignacio Manuel Altamirano =

Mexican writer, journalist, teacher and politician (1834–1893)

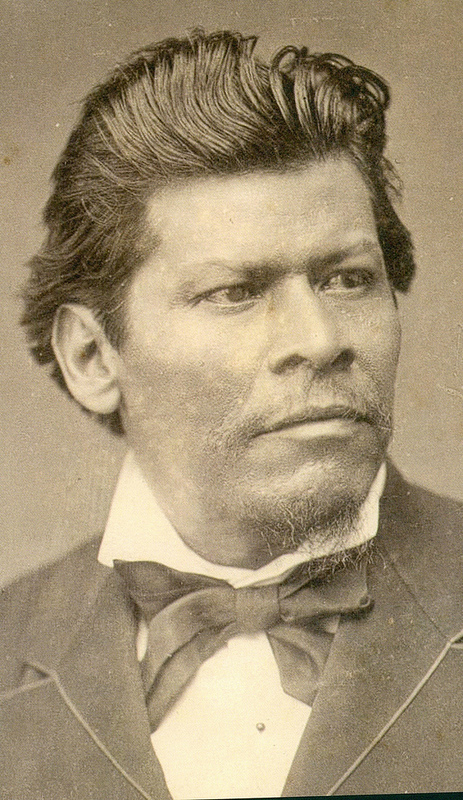
Ignacio Manuel Altamirano

Ignacio Manuel Altamirano Basilio (Spanish pronunciation: [iɣˈnasjo maˈnwel altamiˈɾano βaˈsiljo]; 13 November 1834 – 13 February 1893) was a Mexican radical liberal writer, journalist, teacher and politician. He wrote Clemencia (1869), which is often considered to be the first modern Mexican novel.

== Biography ==
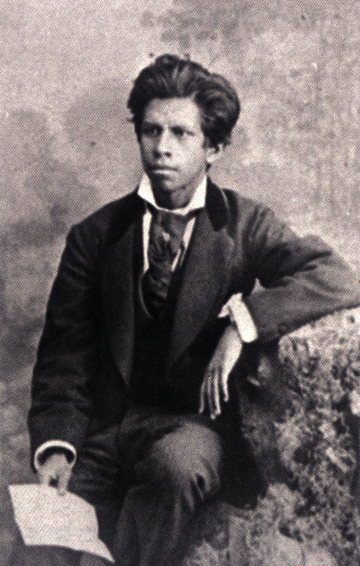
Altamirano in his youth

Altamirano was born in Tixtla, Guerrero, of indigenous Chontal heritage. His father was the mayor of Tixtla, this allowed Ignacio to attend school there. He later studied in Toluca thanks to a scholarship that was granted him by Ignacio Ramírez, of whom he was a disciple.

As a liberal politician, Altamirano opposed Benito Juárez's continuation in office in 1861, allying himself with other liberal foes of Juárez and supporting Jesús González Ortega. With the French invasion of Mexico in 1862, Altamirano understood how dire the situation was for Mexico, since unlike the U.S. invasion (1846–48), which united Mexicans against the invader, the French were supported by Mexican conservatives. His best-known novel is El Zarco, which is set in Yautepec, Morelos during the Reform War of 1857–1860. It tells the story of an honorable and courageous Indian blacksmith who falls in love with a haughty village girl, only to have her elope with the cold-blooded bandit, "Zarco Blue Eyes."

He founded several newspapers and magazines including El Correo de México ("The Mexico Post"), El Renacimiento ("The Renaissance") (1869), El Federalista ("The Federalist"), La Tribuna ("The Tribune") and La República ("The Republic").

Altamirano was president of the Sociedad Mexicana de Geografía y Estadística (Mexican Society for Geography and Statistics) from 1881 to 1889. He was also public prosecutor, magistrate and president of the Supreme Court, as well as senior officer of the Ministry of Public Works and the Economy.

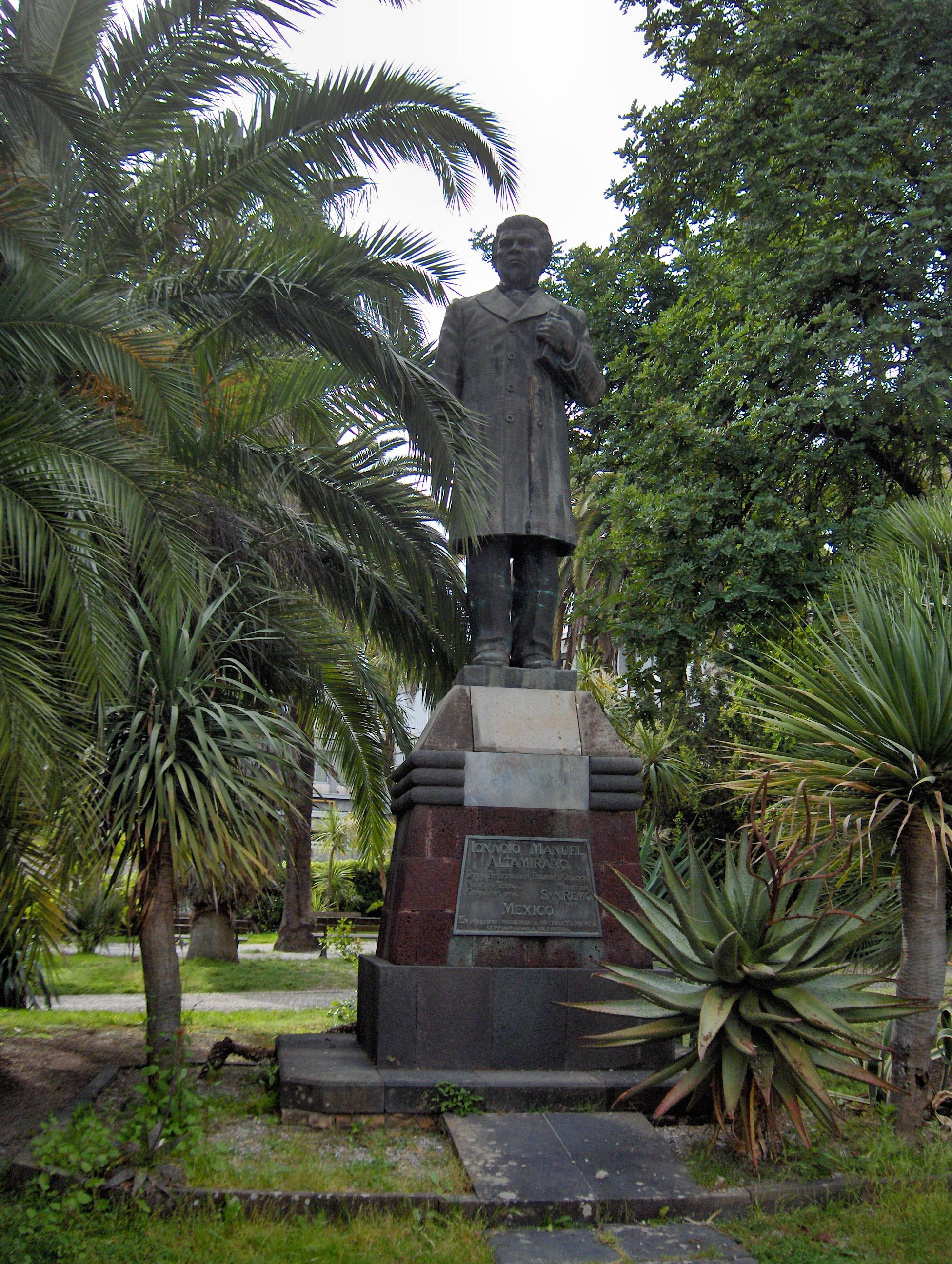
Statue in San Remo, Italy

He died in San Remo, Italy, in 1893.

== Bibliography ==
- La literatura nacional (1849)
- Clemencia (1869), Ed.Elibros, ebook. ISBN 9789588732312
- Crónicas de la semana (1869)
- La Navidad en las montañas (1871), ebook, Ed.Elibros ISBN CDLPG00010825
- Antonia (1872)
- Beatriz (1873)
- Atenea
- Cuentos de invierno (1880)
- Rimas (1880)
- El Zarco (written 1885–1889, published 1901), Ed. Siglo XXI, México. ISBN 9789682322402 (posthumous)
- Paisajes y leyendas, tradiciones y costumbres de México (1886)
- Obras (1899)

== See also ==
- List of people from Morelos
