= Sociedad Mexicana de Geografía y Estadística =

Sociedad Mexicana de Geografía y Estadística (Mexican Society for Geography and Statistics) is a national organization founded on 18 April 1833 to promote the mapping and boundary demarcation of the newly independent Mexican state. The aim of its founders was to aid a number of governmental agencies and through the efforts of liberal head of state, Valentín Gómez Farías. It was the first geographical society in the Americas and the fourth in the world.

From the beginning, the scope of projects was very broad, covering not only the physiography of the territory but also its natural resources and their potential for development. Also included in their study was the nature of the population, its size, age distribution, ethnic and linguistic makeup. One of the first publications was in 1850, the work of geographer Antonio García Cubas, followed by an atlas of the republic, started in 1841 and completed in 1850, but not published for several years due to lack of funds.

Among the achievements of the Society were:

- Initiatives within the Mexican government to issue laws providing a process for determining the official names of cities and towns.
- Promoted legislation for the care of forests and conservation of archaeological monuments as a national priority.
- Produced a report on the metric system, which allowed Mexico to be among the first countries in Latin America to adopt it.
- Proposed the laying out of a telegraph system for Mexico City.
- Sponsoring the publication of the Boletín de la Sociedad Mexicana de Geografía y Estadística (Bulletin of the Society) for the dissemination of all the reports and data that the Society accumulated.

Currently the Society contributes to the research, analysis and understanding of the major problems of Mexico through its 55 specialized academies and local societies involved in the various Mexican states. This includes close ties with Instituto Nacional de Estadística y Geografía (INEGI), and working with the various Mexican universities as well as with major U.S. institutions.

== Notable presidents ==
- 1839-1846, 1848-1850, and 1853 Juan Nepomuceno Almonte
- 1861 Miguel Lerdo de Tejada
- 1881-1889 Ignacio Manuel Altamirano
- 1934, 1944, and 1946 Jesús Silva Herzog
- 1959 Isidro Fabela
