= Eucharistic miracle of Sokółka =

Eucharistic miracle from 2008

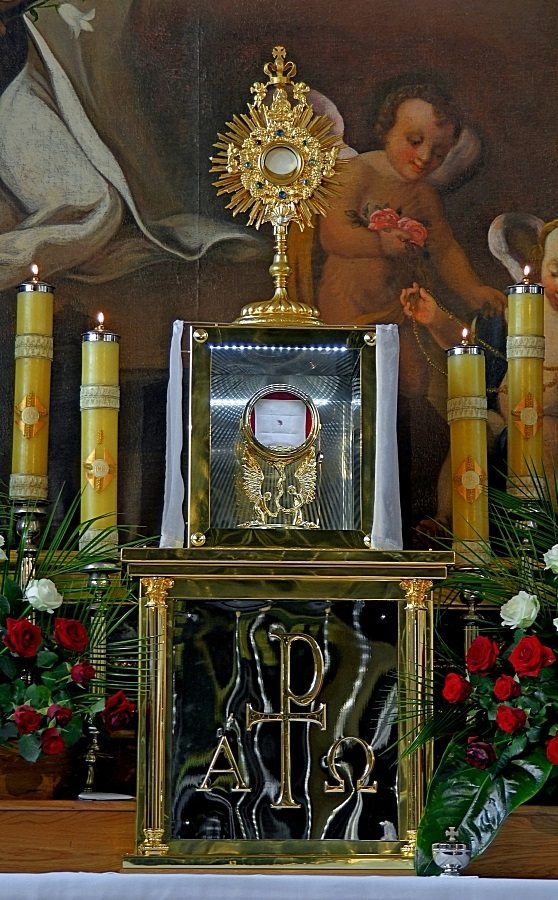
- Reliquary with the consecrated host and the presumed blood of Christ

Information
- Type: Eucharistic miracle
- Date: October 12, 2008
- Denomination: Catholic

Location
- Location: Saint Anthony of Padua Church in Sokółka
- Country: Poland
- City: Sokółka
- Diocese: Archdiocese of Białystok
- Deanery: Sokółka deanery
- Preserved in: Saint Anthony of Padua Church in Sokółka

The Eucharistic miracle of Sokółka is an alleged Eucharistic miracle that took place on October 12, 2008, in Sokółka, Poland.

The event was publicized in October of 2009, with some criticism directed towards the church investigation. The Medical University of Białystok had stated the research was done unofficially, and news media raised concerns about the specificity and independence of the research conducted. The event is celebrated yearly on October 1, and draws thousands of pilgrims to Sokółka annually.

== Event ==
The event took place at the Church of Saint Anthony of Padua in Sokółka, Poland, two weeks after the beatification of Michał Sopoćko that took place at the nearby Divine Mercy Sanctuary in Białystok in front of 80,000 people.

During the 8:30 am Sunday mass on October 12, 2008, a consecrated host fell from the hands of a vicar named Jacek Ingielewicz during the Eucharist and landed on the floor. The slightly dirty host was picked up by him and placed in a container with water in the tabernacle. After the mass ended, the parish sacristan Julia Dubowska moved the host and water into another container and stored it away so that the host could safely dissolve, at the request of parish priest Stanisław Gniedziejko.

A week later, on October 19, when Dubowska went to check on the state of the host, she noticed a red blood-like stain in the middle of the host, roughly the size of a small coin. She informed Gniedziejko about the red stain identified. Gniedziejko went to Edward Ozorowski, the auxiliary bishop of Białystok, who arrived in Sokółka accompanied by the chancellor of the curia Andrzej Kakareko. On October 29, Gniedziejko was instructed by the bishop to move the container to the rectory. The host was later ordered to be taken out of the water and placed on a corporal.

== Ecclesiastical investigation and report ==
On January 7, 2009, a sample from the host was sent to medical professors Maria Sobaniec-Lotowska and Stanislaw Sulkowski, both from the Medical University of Białystok. The professors finished their private analysis on January 21 of that year, when they submitted a report to the Metropolitan Curia of Białystok. In 2009 it was reported that they concluded that the material found on the host was likely the cardiac tissue of a living organism. In a 2018 theological paper published in Teologia i Człowiek, the same researchers sought to place the Sokółka "miracle" in its linguistic and cultural context. They reiterated their conclusion that the tissue was from a human heart, and that the sample looked as if it came from a living person in agony.

On March 30, 2009, Archbishop Ozorowski appointed an ecclesiastical commission to investigate the event, interviewing witnesses and reviewing pathological findings. They found no third party interference in the event. Their work was complete by October of that year. The commission forwarded its findings to the Apostolic Nunciature to Poland in Warsaw.

== Announcement and aftermath ==
On October 14, 2009, the Metropolitan Curia of Białystok—an administrative body of the archdiocese, announced the events to the public for the first time. The organization said that "the event in Sokółka does not contradict the Church's faith; rather, it confirms it". They also published findings of the ecclesiastical commission.

=== Reactions and scientific criticism ===
After the announcement, the Medical University of Białystok released a statement distancing itself from the research, as no official scientific study was commissioned or conducted by the university. The spokesman Lech Chyczewski in the institution's journal Medyk Białystok, detailed that the research was conducted informally and outside of official channels in the Academic Department of Pathomorphological Diagnostics of the University. Chyczewski also made statements on his colleagues that "they are characterized by an emotional approach to faith", but "they are experienced pathologists, so it's highly likely that the tissue they examined comes from the heart muscle", but said that finding raised the questions about the material's origin. He emphasized that histopathological examinations won't provide an answer, and genetic testing would dispel any doubts.

Polish newspaper Rzeczpospolita published an article critical of many aspects of the announcement and investigation. It stated that one of the researchers, Sobaniec-Lotowska, was already a staunch Catholic and close confidante of the Archbishop, and she was reluctant to speak to journalists. Chyczewski noted the letter request from the curia was named to and only sent to Sobaniec-Łotowska, and not the required central management team or facility. He did not immediately express his concerns as she was "very emotionally involved in this matter". It was also suggested that the research conducted was unclear, and the claimed test used by the investigators could only determine if the tissue was mammalian, not specifically human.

The same article reported that professor Lech Chyczewski, Karol Śliwka and the Department of Forensic Medicine in Bydgoszcz offered to the Archbishop to conduct further testing, which would include independent analysis of DNA, nuclei arrangement and other genetic evaluations. They also raised questions of if it was to be believed, whether the muscle was skeletal or cardiac in nature, human or animal, male or female, and what region of the world it comes from. However, the Archbishop declined any further forensic or molecular testing. Rev. Marian Rusecki on the other hand, believed that from a scientific perspective such further analysis should have been allowed, especially for those who suspected manipulation and fraud.

Another colleague Paweł Grzesiowski, stated it had an explanation in an already observed biological phenomenon called serratia marcescens, also known as "miracle bacillus". It produces a red pigment called prodigosin, and grows on carbohydrate substrates like bread. This bacteria and fungus rapidly proliferates, and can visually resemble flesh or blood.

The Polish Rationalist Association concerned if human flesh was actually found on the wafer, filed a notification with the Białystok district police to investigate if a murder or other crime was involved in collecting the purported flesh related to the host. Police stated there was no need for formal criminal proceedings, as there was a lack of evidence for any crime.

In 2024, Kelly Kearse and Frank Ligaj showed methodological problems and a need for open standardization when evaluating Eucharistic miracle claims. They pointed out that with Sokółka the water was left untainted by the red pigment on the host, which is a contradiction if any bleeding or actual blood was involved. Furthermore, using non-consecrated wafers as controls, Kearse and Ligaj were able to replicate the phenomenon, when they treated their samples in the same manner as the reported Sokółka host's discovery by being dropped on the floor and then placed in water. The similarities included having the same darkened areas and reddish spots resembling blood as Sokółka, which in his comparative sample was caused by sporodochia from Epicoccum nigrum.

== Legacy ==
At Sokółka itself, opinions about what happened in the church were divided, while town officials were satisfied with the free publicity, and inn keepers were expecting tourists. In 2011, the host was transferred to the Chapel of Our Lady of the Rosary in the Sokółka Collegiate Church, allowing visitors to see it for the first time.

The miracle is celebrated by the faithful each year on October 1, with thousands of pilgrims gathering there each year on that date. Local Catholics also state in testimonies that the believed in miracle has provided supernatural healing for a number of individuals.

== See also ==
- Carlo Acutis
- Catholic Church in Poland
- Divine Mercy
- Eucharistic miracle
- Eucharistic miracle of Legnica
- Real presence of Christ in the Eucharist
