= Leonard Drożdżewicz =

Polish writer and activist

- Born: 14 September 1960; Sokółka, Poland
- Occupations: Notary; columnist; activist
- Website: Leonard Drożdżewicz

Leonard Drożdżewicz (born 14 August 1960) is a Polish notary, columnist, publisher and social activist.

== Biography ==
He graduated from law studies in 1984 at the University of Warsaw, where he was a disciple of Lech Falandysz.

In June 1986, he started his notary's office in his hometown Sokółka, in Podlaskie Voivodeship in northeastern Poland. Between 1997 and 2000 he was the secretary of the National Council of Notaries in Warsaw (Polish: Krajowa Rada Notarialna). Between 1999 and 2004, he was the secretary of the Council of the Notary Science Center Foundation (Polish: Fundacja Centrum Naukowe Notariatu), established by the National Council of Notaries in order to support and conduct scientific and research works in the field of law, also in Warsaw. Until mid-2012, he was a member of the foundation's Council.

He has published several dozen articles in the field of civil, economic, notary and foundation law in legal journals, including the monthly Rejent and Nowy Przegląd Notarialny. Since 2013, he has been a regular collaborator of the literary and cultural quarterly Znad Wilii, published in Vilnius. Together with his wife, Helena Drożdżewicz, he published two booklets in Polish: Sokólski Brueghel – Witalis Sarosiek (1945–2012; 2013) and Antologia Doliny Łosośny: jak pieśń żurawia nad wiekowymi wiązami (2019). He also published a chapter in the book Historia, tradycja, pamięć: prace ofiarowane Profesorowi Józefowi Maroszkowi w siedemdziesiątą rocznicę urodzin (2020).

Since 2016, together with his cousin Wiktoria Tołłoczko-Tur, he has been organizing an annual international open-air painting workshop In the Valley of Lasosna in Puciłki on the Lasosna (Polish: W dolinie Łosośny; the first pilot plein-air took place in 2014), which takes place in the summer house of Leonard and Helena Drożdżewicz. Leonard Drożdżewicz inherited this house with farm buildings, land and a pond nearby from his parents, and then renovated it as a pre-war summer resort.

== Awards ==
- Honorary badge “For Merits for the Notary Self-Government of the Republic of Poland” awarded by the National Council of Notaries (9 October 1999);
- Silver Cross of Merit “for activities for the Polish community in Lithuania, cultivating the common historical and cultural heritage” (2017).
