= Tixtla =

City in the Mexican state of Guerrero

- Municipal seat and city
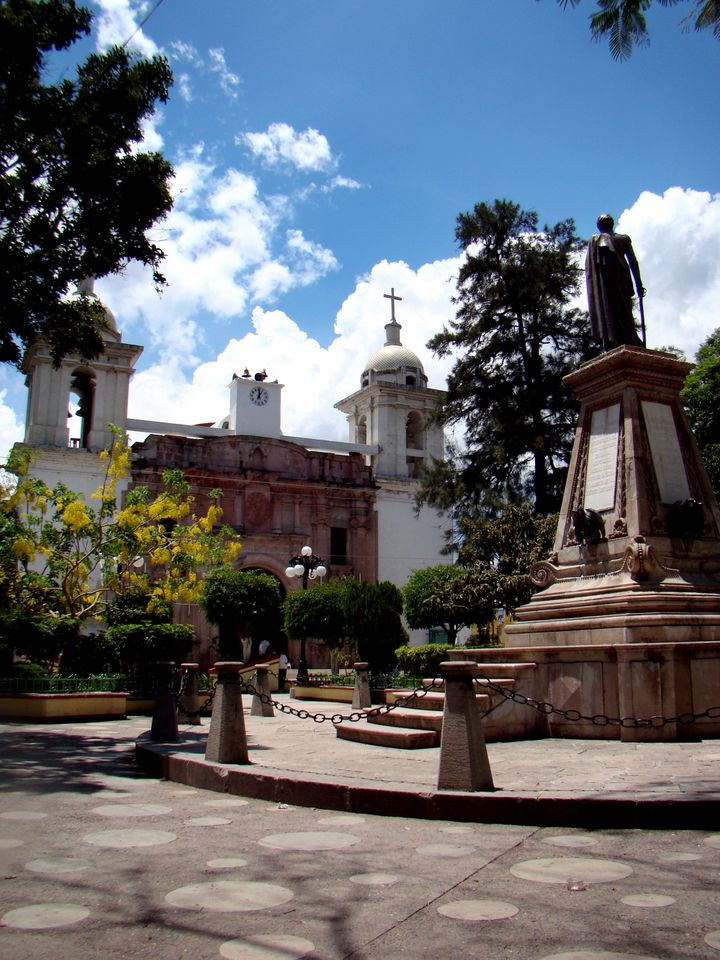

- Location in the state of Guerrero Location in Mexico
- Coordinates: 17°34′N 99°24′W
- Country: Mexico
- State: Guerrero
- Municipality: Tixtla de Guerrero

Population (2005)
  - Total: 21,720
- Time zone: UTC-6 (Zona Centro)

Tixtla (formally, Tixtla de Guerrero) (Spanish: [ˈtiɣstla ðe ɣeˈreɾo], Nahuatl: [ˈtiʃt͡ɬa]) is a town and seat of the municipality of Tixtla de Guerrero in the Mexican state of Guerrero. The name is Nahuatl, and means either "maize dough" (masa) from textli; "our valley" from to ixtla; or "temple by the water" from teoixtlen.

== History ==
Antonia Nava de Catalán, a heroine of the Mexican War of Independence, was born in Tixtla. Tixtla was also the birthplace of both Independence hero and Mexican president Vicente Guerrero (1783–1831) and writer and educator Ignacio Manuel Altamirano (1834–1893). It served as the first capital of Guerrero, from 1851 to 1870, and the state constitution was promulgated there on 14 June 1851.

On 21 October 2006, a claimed Eucharistic miracle is said to have occurred at a parish in the city. On 12 October 2013, the then-Bishop of the Diocese of Chilpancingo-Chilapa Alejo Zavala Castro declared it a miracle, however it has not been yet approved by the Vatican.

== Geography ==
The municipality is located between 17°20' & 17°43' N and 99°15' & 99°28' W, some 20 km (12 mi) east of state capital Chilpancingo. It covers a total surface area of 290 km^{2} (110 sq mi). It reported 33,620 people in the 2000 census, including 18% Native Americans (speakers of Nahuatl and Tlapaneco).

Other towns in the municipality include Atliaca (population 5,981), Almolonga (1,346), Zoquiapa (1,243), and El Durazno (1,070).

=== Climate ===
Climate data for Tixtla de Guerrero
Month	Jan	Feb	Mar	Apr	May	Jun	Jul	Aug	Sep	Oct	Nov	Dec	Year

== Culture ==
The city is known for its music and festivals.

== Notable people ==
- Antonia Nava de Catalán
- Ignacio Manuel Altamirano
- Vicente Guerrero
