= Eucharistic miracle of Lanciano =

Eighth century Eucharistic miracle according to Catholic tradition

Coordinates: 42°13′48″N 14°23′24″E

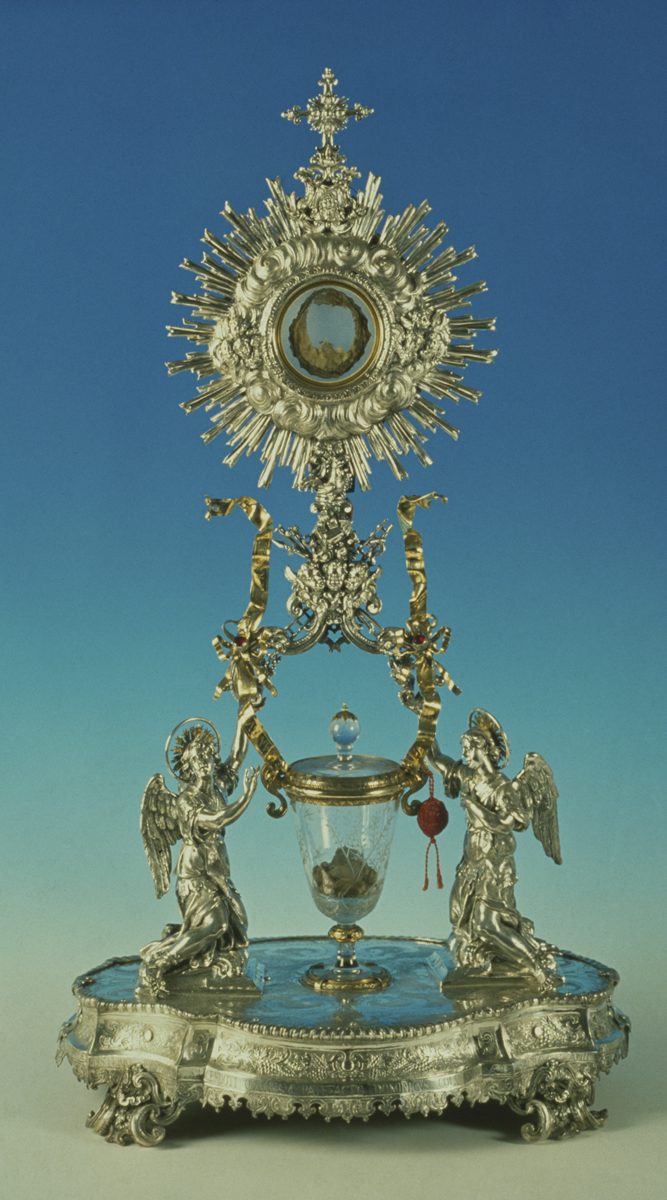
- Reliquary displaying the relics of the Eucharistic miracle of Lanciano

Information
- Type: Eucharistic miracle
- Date: 8th century
- Denomination: Catholic

Location
- Country: Italy
- City: Lanciano
- Preserved in: Church of St. Francis in Lanciano

The Miracle of Lanciano is a Eucharistic miracle said to have occurred in the eighth century in the city of Lanciano, Italy. According to tradition, a Basilian monk who had doubts about the real presence of Christ in the Eucharist found, when he said the words of consecration at Mass, that the bread and wine changed into flesh and blood. The Catholic Church officially recognizes this miracle as authentic. Numerous analyses have been performed on the relic and the historical tradition.

The incident is similar to the tradition known as the Mass of Saint Gregory, first recorded in the 8th century by Paul the Deacon. The Miracle of Lanciano, together with the Eucharistic miracle of Santarém, in Portugal, is considered among the most important of these miracles. The National Catholic Register called it "perhaps the most famous and well-known" of the Eucharistic miracles.

There have been numerous analyses of the miracle claim. A scientific analysis by Linoli in the 1970s reported the relics kept in Lanciano had heart tissue, though skeptics like Fuso criticize the historic reliability of the tradition due to the absence of sources before the 16th century. Kearse and Ligaj would find potential issues in some findings surrounding Lanciano, and warned of false claims associated with the event.

== History of the miracle ==
The first known reports of the event date to 1574 and do not specify the exact year in which it would have occurred, but some believe that certain historical circumstances allow it to be placed chronologically eight centuries earlier, between 730 and 750. The Byzantine emperor Leo III the Isaurian, who reigned from 717 to 741, implemented a strict policy against religious images by promulgating an edict in 730 ordering their destruction. Mosaics and frescoes were destroyed with hammers, icons were thrown into the fire and several Greek monks were killed. As a consequence, many religious people, including numerous Basilian monks, took refuge in Italy.

The miracle is described as follows: In the city of Lanciano, Italy, then known as Anxanum, some time in the 700s, a Basilian hieromonk was assigned to celebrate Mass at the monastery of St. Longinus. Celebrating in the Roman Rite and using unleavened bread, the monk had doubts about the Catholic doctrine of the real presence. During the Mass, when he said the Words of Consecration ("This is my body. This is my blood"), the priest saw the bread change into living flesh and the wine change into blood, which coagulated into five globules, of different shapes and sizes.

Since there are no contemporary sources, the details and not even the name of the protagonist of the events are known; however, some sources give the idea that he must have been a priest of the Byzantine rite and a Basilian monk.

== Relics ==
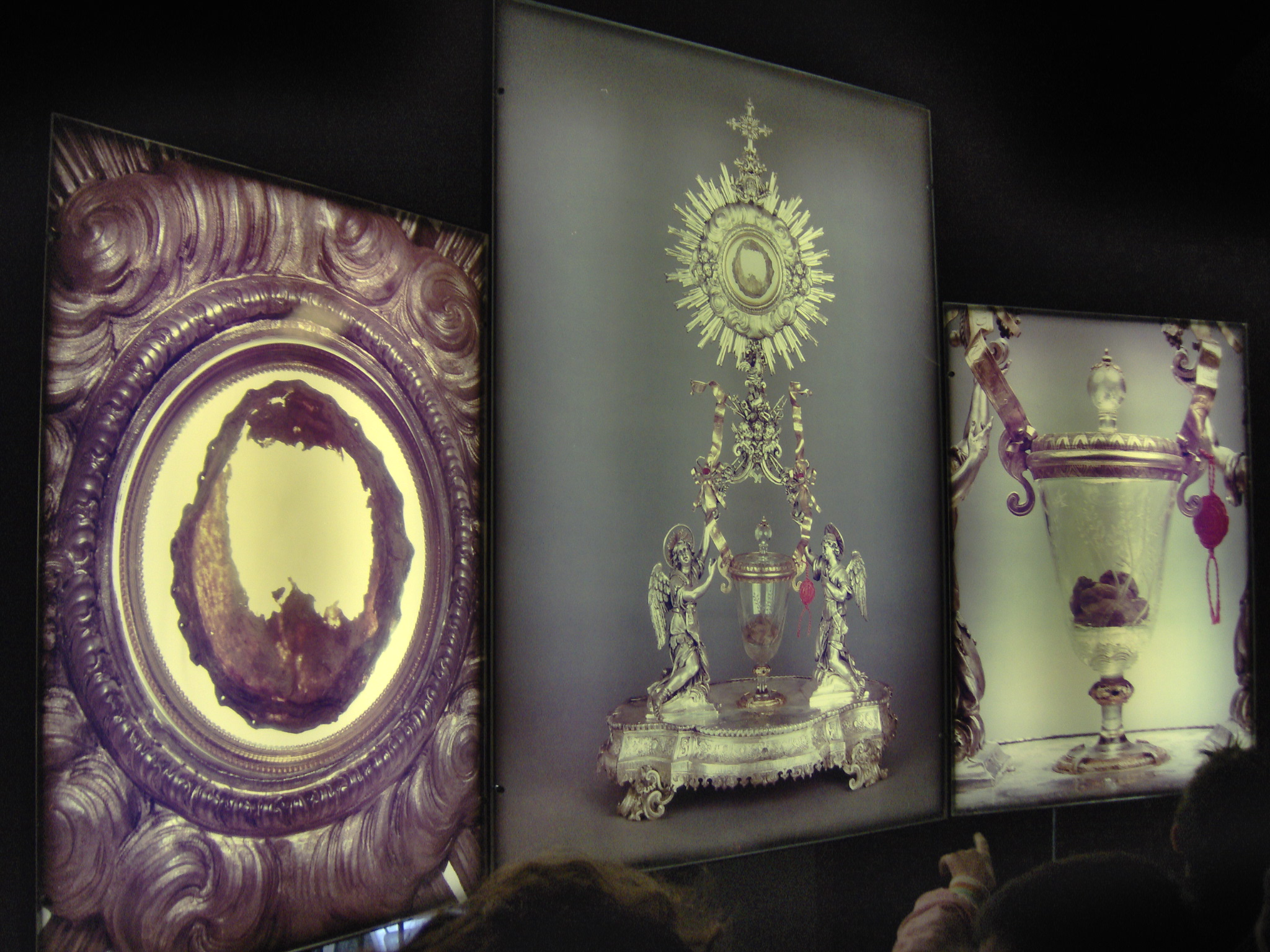
Close-ups of portions (left and right) of the reliquary (center) exhibited on rear-lighted panels

The Basilian monks purportedly kept custody of the Eucharistic elements until their departure in 1175. They were succeeded by Benedictine monks in 1176. The items were placed in different locations within the Church of St. Francis in Lanciano. They were kept in the Valsecca Chapel from 1636 until 1902 when they were relocated to a new altar.

As of 2012, the relics of this miracle are kept in the Church of St. Francis in Lanciano. In 2004, Pope John Paul II recalled visiting the relics there while a cardinal. They are displayed in a silver and glass reliquary made in Naples in 1713.

The host matter consists of a rounded membrane, yellow-brown in colour, with a shading of greater intensity, and contains a large central hole; it is identified with the flesh. This relic also has numerous pin-sized holes around its outer rim created by a needle, and the material was pulled towards the edges and folded over, with the open centre subsequently caused by mechanical tension and pulling. These features have been interpreted as monks trying to preserve it. The wine matter comes in the form of five earthy brown lumps of different shapes and sizes, claimed to be the coagulated blood. Over the centuries the relics were examined several times. During the first reconnaissance, carried out in 1574 by Archbishop Gaspare Rodriguez, it was said that the weight of each blood clot was equal to the total weight of the five clots. This supernatural claim had a theological meaning: Each drop of the consecrated wine contained in its entirety the complete and indivisible substance of the blood of Jesus.

== Analysis and authenticity ==
=== 1574 analysis ===
Archbishop Gaspare Rodriguez investigated the relics in 1574, weighing the blood clots. This phenomenon is mentioned only on the epitaph erected in 1636. Later experiments failed to confirm the alleged observation.

=== 1970 Linoli investigation ===
In November 1970, at the request of the Archbishop of Lanciano, Pacifico Maria Luigi Perantoni, and the Provincial Superior of the Order of Friars Minor Conventual of the Abruzzo region, Bruno Luciani, the Franciscan friars of Lanciano, who guarded the relics, decided, with the authorization of the Vatican, to have them subjected to medical-scientific analysis. The task was performed by Odoardo Linoli, head of the laboratory of clinical analysis and pathological anatomy of the hospital of Arezzo—full professor of anatomy, histology, chemistry, and clinical microscopy—and Ruggero Bertelli, professor of anatomy at the University of Siena. Published in Quaderni Sclavo di Diagnostica, the histological and microchemical studies according to Linoli revealed that the relics were human heart muscle tissue.

Procedural and methodological critiques were raised by biologist Antonio Casolari. He outlined that it was conducted by a single individual without a multidisciplinary and independent panel, and stated Ruggero Bertelli was never actually present for the sampling or slide preparation.

In 2009, Luigi Garlaschelli an organic chemist at the University of Pavia and lead investigator of CICAP, stated that the Church has never permitted further studies, and secular scientists and external institutions are routinely denied permission to perform independent, double-blind and repeatable testing on relics with modern technology. He indicated that natural mummification can allow it to endure for centuries in a closed glass reliquary, and explained the need for radiocarbon dating to see if the material actually dates to the 8th century and is not simply from the high medieval era, Renaissance or a later replacement. Garlaschelli emphasized standard ABO typing conducted on organic matter that is centuries old and degraded is invalid without modern controls.

Kelly Kearse and Frank Ligaj highlighted possible problems surrounding the 1971 report and other subsequent claims about human blood. They mentioned Linoli actually documented the accumulation of fungus, spores and hypha of hyphomyces, as well as the "blood substance" being entirely composed of a uniformly hardened material that was difficult to detach without strong pressure. Kearse similarly drew attention to the problematic AB blood type claim because of bacterial contamination. They state while the Lanciano investigation was commendable as being the first attempt, it's unfortunate that in later years it has been associated with fraudulent activity involving others.

=== Forged World Health Organization report ===
In the 2000s, some sources, including a ZENIT interview with Linoli, reported that in 1973 the World Health Organization (WHO) had appointed a UN backed scientific commission to study the Lanciano relic with around 500 examinations conducted. Then in 1976 they published a complete report confirming the scientific inexplicability of the relic. However, in 2019 Kelly Kearse and others searched for any of these results or documentation, contacting the United Nations, but the WHO stated they had no records of any such investigations during that period. Later, in 2021 cardiologist Franco Serafini investigated this supposed report, finding a copy possessed by clerics in Lanciano. He found it to be a fraud that combined some relevant details about the Lanciano miracle with unrelated material and tests about Egyptian mummies. The "WHO" report was kept in the Lanciano convent itself, and its conclusions were presented to pilgrims throughout that time.

=== Historical analysis ===
Silvano Fuso, a member of the Italian Committee for the Investigation of Claims of the Pseudosciences, criticized the authenticity of the miracle claim by emphasizing there are no sources older than 1574 for an event of the eighth century. According to Joe Nickell, history indicates that a number of Eucharistic miracle stories have suspiciously similar plot points, and could indicate derivation of the traditions. In Spiegare i miracoli, physician Maurizio Magnani contextualized the Lanciano relic narrative—which he considered to be a legend, within 13th century disputes between the Franciscans and Dominicans over the nature of transubstantiation. He considered the account to be part of a wider phenomenon of reported bleeding hosts which served to persuade doubters and consolidate belief in the real presence.
