= Eucharistic miracle of Santarém =

Thirteenth-century Christian miracle

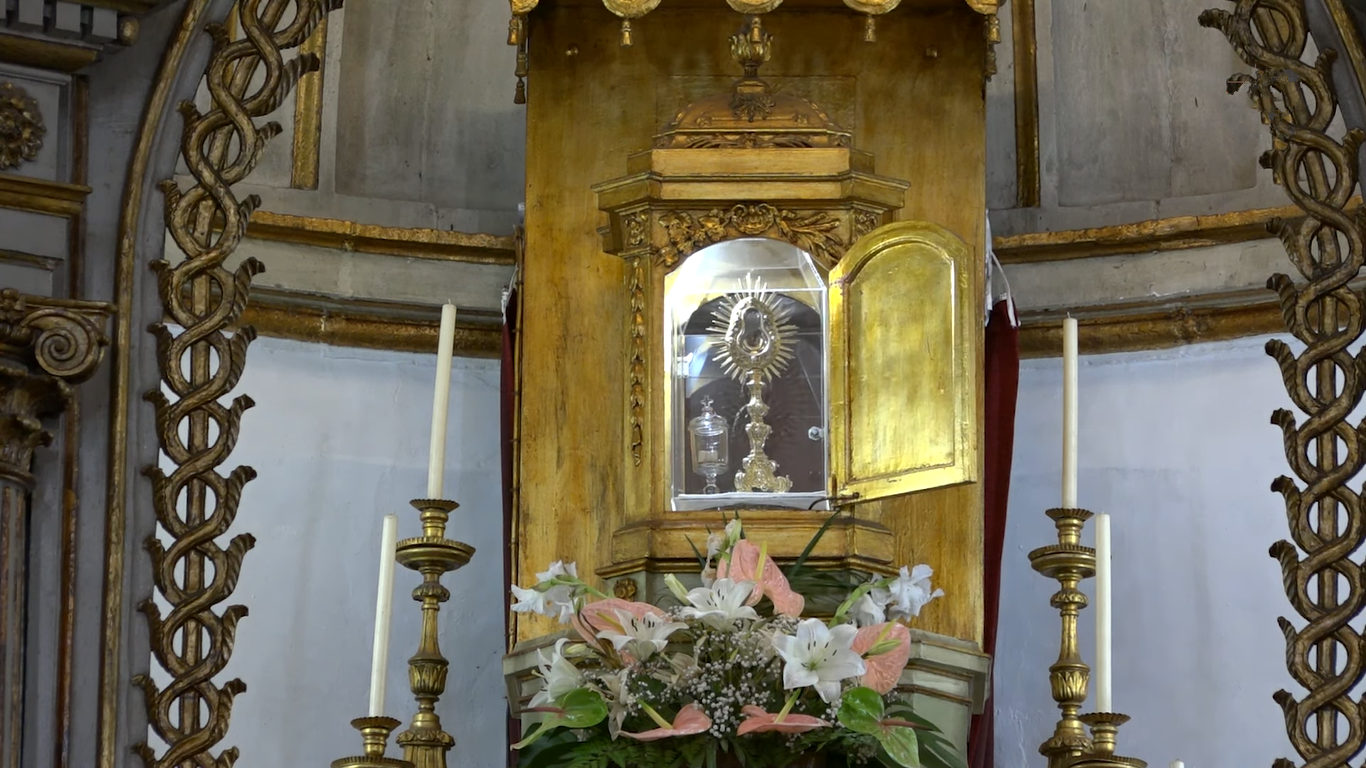
- Reliquary displaying the relics of the Eucharistic miracle of Santarém

Information
- Type: Eucharistic miracle
- Date: 1226 or 1247
- Denomination: Catholic

Location
- Location: Church of Saint Stephen
- Country: Portugal
- City: Santarém
- Preserved in: Sanctuary of the Most Holy Miracle of Santarém

The Eucharistic miracle of Santarém, also called the Most Holy Miracle (Portuguese: Santíssimo Milagre), is one of the most famous and recognized eucharistic miracles in the world, which occurred in Santarém, Portugal, in the 13th century, and is still the object of national and international veneration today.

The Miracle of Santarém, together with the Eucharistic miracle of Lanciano, in Italy, is considered among the most important.

== History of the miracle ==
It was the year 1226 (or 1247, according to some chroniclers) when, in Santarém, there lived a poor woman, whom her husband mistreated a lot, going astray with another woman. Tired of suffering, she went to ask a witch who, with her spells, could put an end to her sad fate. She promised her this effective remedy, but she would need a consecrated host.

After hesitating, the poor woman went to the Church of Saint Stephen, confessed and, having received the Sacred Particle, with great caution she took it out of her mouth, wrapping it in the veil. She quickly left the church, heading towards the witch's house. But then, without her noticing, blood began to flow from the veil, which, seen by several people, led them to ask the unfortunate woman what injuries she had. Extremely confused, she ran home and enclosed the Miraculous Host in a chest. The day passed, however, and in the afternoon her husband returned. In the middle of the night, they both woke up and saw the whole house shining. From the ark came mysterious rays of light. Once the man was informed of the woman's sinful act, they knelt down and spent the rest of the night in worship.

As soon as day broke, the parish priest was informed of the supernatural prodigy. Once the news spread, half the population of Santarém rushed to contemplate the Miracle. The Sacred Particle was then taken, processionally, to the Church of Saint Stephen, where it was preserved inside a kind of ostensory made of wax. But, after a few years (in 1340), when the tabernacle was opened to expose the worship of the faithful, as was customary, the wax was found torn into pieces and, with astonishment, it was discovered that the Sacred Particle was enclosed in a crystal ambula, miraculously appeared. This small ambula was placed in a silver-gilt monstrance, where it is still located today.

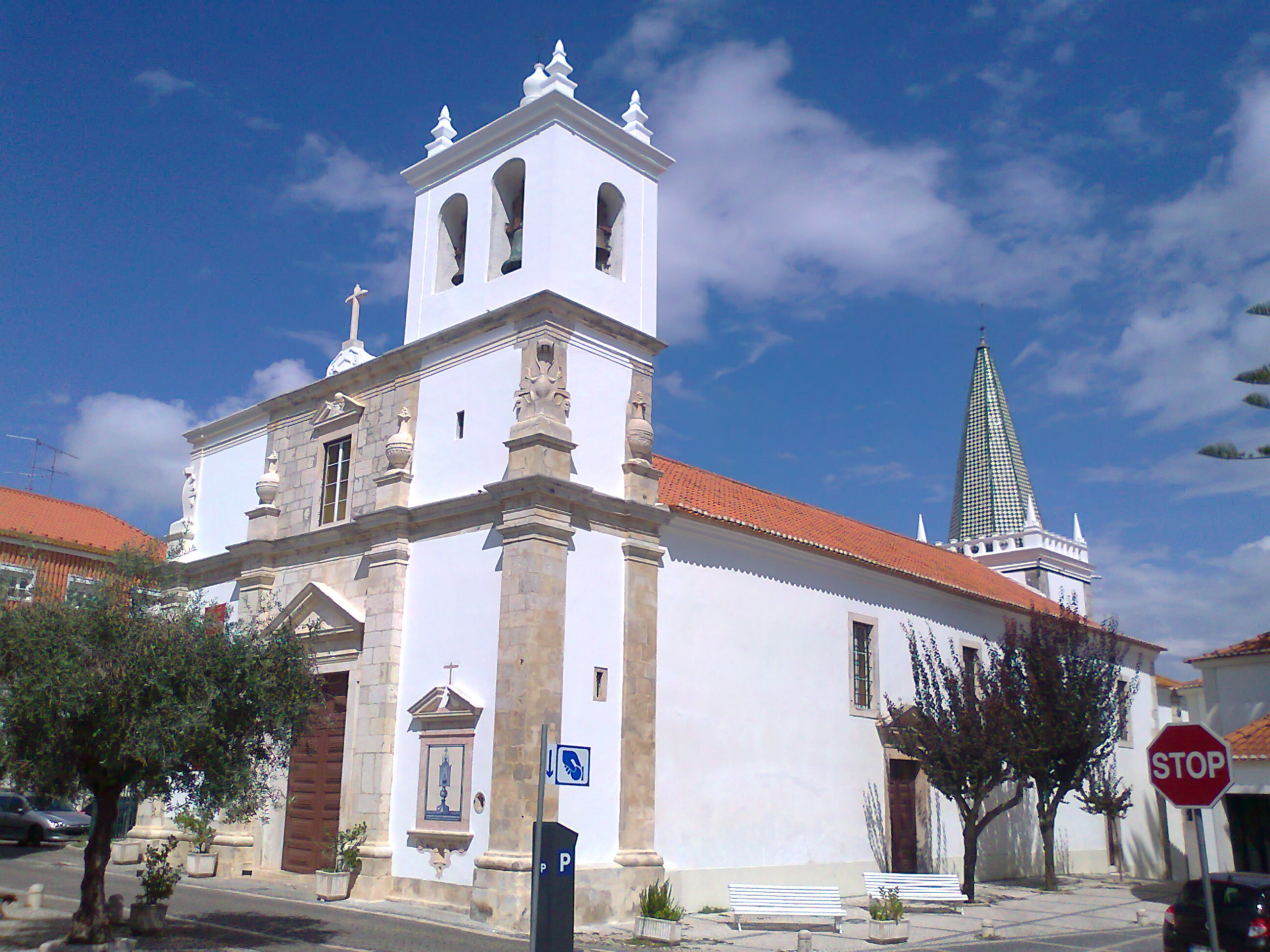
The Sanctuary of the Most Holy Miracle in Santarém, Portugal

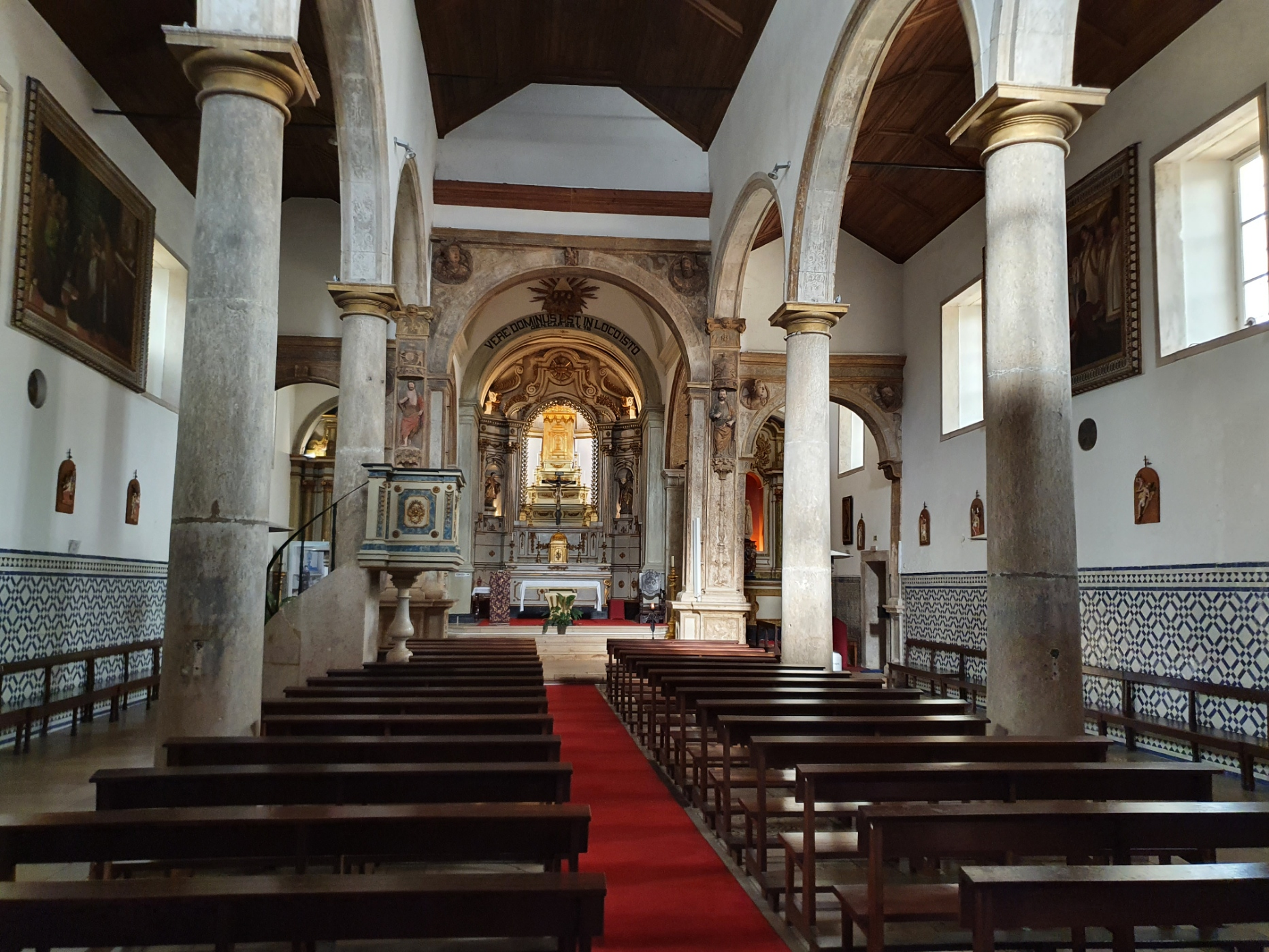
Interior of the Church-Shrine of the Most Holy Miracle of Santarém

The Parish Church of Saint Stephen is currently the Sanctuary of the Most Holy Miracle of Santarém. Since the miracle occurred, this church has been the destination of countless processions, carried out by the royal court, or by great personalities of the nobility and clergy, especially under the pretext of illness, floods, or drought. There are many echoes that, in documents, remain with us as testimony, such as the case of Queen Elizabeth of Portugal, who passed through Santarém on her way to Coimbra, in order to pacify the disagreements between her husband Denis and her son Afonso IV: she ordered a procession of prayers, in which she accompanied the Holy Miracle barefoot, with a rope around her neck and covered in ashes, thus imploring the mercy of the Most High. Also King Afonso VI of Portugal, on January 25, 1664, when traveling to Santarém, did not fail to visit the Church of the Most Holy Miracle and the Convent of Saint Dominic, where, at that time, the mysterious towel that had wrapped the Sacred Host and in which the blood was still visible. In the place where the poor woman's house was located, today stands the Chapel of the Miracle.

== Position of the Catholic Church ==
The Catholic Church officially recognizes the Eucharistic miracle of Santarém as authentic.

Several popes have granted indulgences to pilgrims and visitors devoted to the Most Holy Miracle of Santarém: Pope Pius IV (1559–1565) granted indulgence to pilgrims who visit the Church of the Most Holy Miracle; Pope Pius V and Pope Pius VI granted privileges to pilgrims that visit the Church-Shrine; and Pope Gregory XIV (1590–1591) granted plenary indulgence to all the members of the Royal Brotherhood of the Most Holy Miracle of Santarém on the day they entered the brotherhood and the day of their death.

== See also ==
- Real presence of Christ in the Eucharist
- Alexandrina of Balazar
