= Eucharistic miracle =

Any miracle involving the Eucharist in Christianity

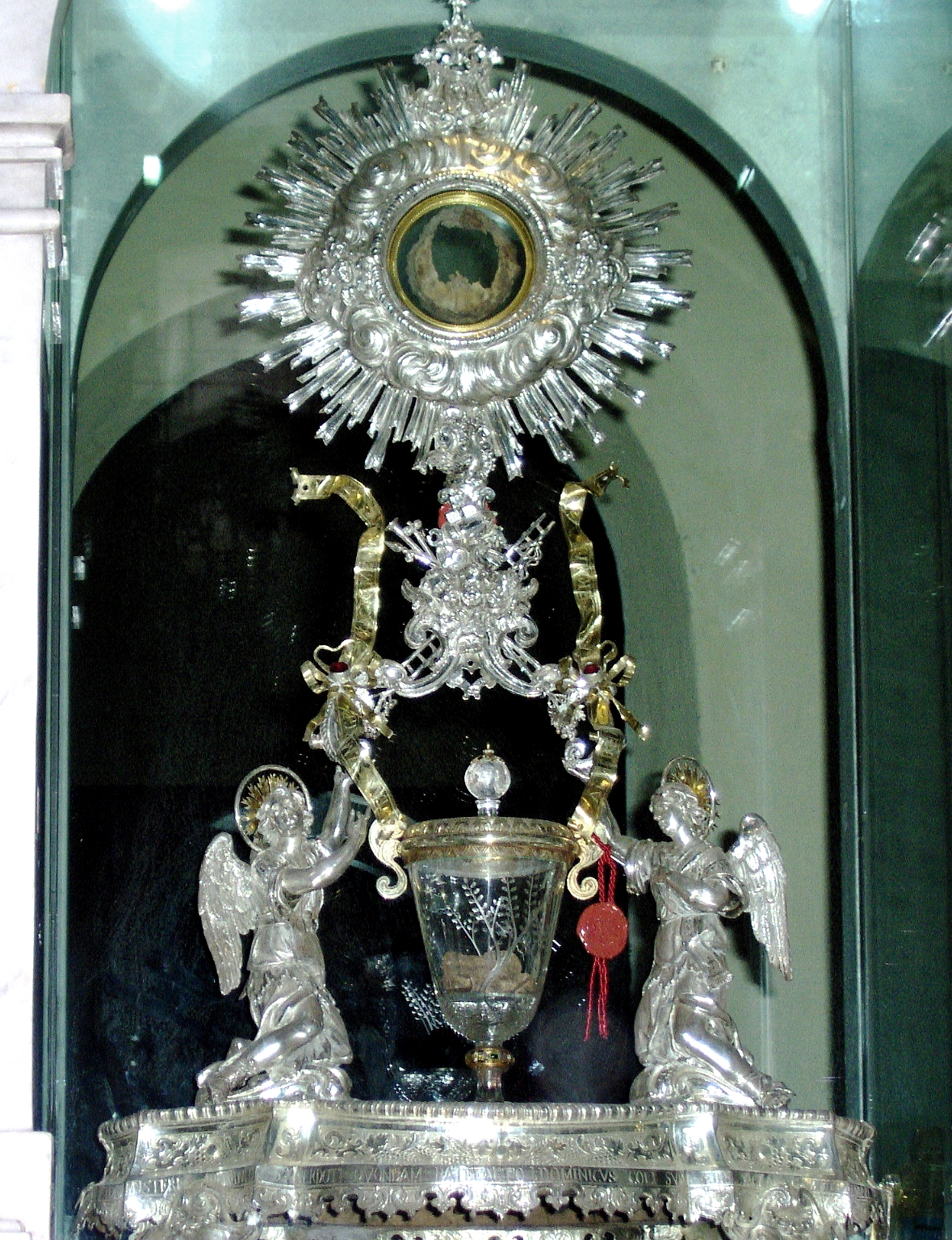
Sacrarium of the Eucharistic miracle of Lanciano; it is believed that the upper portion contains the heart tissue, while the lower receptacle contains the pellets of clotted blood.

A Eucharistic miracle is any miracle involving the Eucharist, regarding which the most prominent Christian denominations, especially the Roman Catholic Church, teach that Christ is truly present in the Eucharist, which is by itself a Eucharistic miracle; however, this is to be distinguished from other manifestations of God. Eucharistic miracles are most known and emphasized within the context of the Catholic Church, which distinguishes between divine revelation, such as the Eucharist, and private revelation, such as Eucharistic miracles.

In general, reported Eucharistic miracles usually consist of unexplainable phenomena such as consecrated Hosts visibly transforming into myocardium tissue, being preserved for extremely long stretches of time, surviving being thrown into fire, bleeding, or even sustaining people for decades.

In the modern Catholic Church, commissions are appointed by local bishops to scientifically and theologically investigate supposed miracles before deciding whether they are worthy of belief. This has sometimes resulted in discoveries where Eucharistic miracles were caused by contamination of red colored microorganisms, such as Neurospora crassa or Serratia marcescens. A 2025 forensic study by Polish scientists of 25 reported Eucharistic miracle cases found no evidence of human blood or human tissue other than isolated epidermal cells and single erythrocytes, and no human DNA except once from trace contact with the genetic marker being I1. The authors identified microbial and fungal contamination in several cases, including pigment-producing species that could explain blood-like discoloration. Serratia marcescens was found only twice, thus casting doubt on its significance in such occurrences, while other fungal and microbial species producing reddish-pink or orange-reddish pigments were discovered.

As with other private revelations, such as Marian apparitions, belief in approved miracles is not mandated by the Catholic Church, but often serves to reassure believers of God's presence or as the means to "send a message" to the population at large.

== Background ==
=== Theology of the Real Presence ===
Roman Catholic Eucharistic doctrine draws upon a quasi-Aristotelian understanding of reality, in which the core substance or essential reality of a given thing is bound to, but not equivalent with, its sensible realities or accidents. In the celebration of the Eucharist, by means of the consecratory Eucharistic Prayer, the actual substance of the bread and wine are changed into the body and blood of Christ. This change in substance is not, however, the outward appearances of the bread and wine—their accidents—which remain as before. This substantial change is called transubstantiation, a term reserved to describe the change itself. Scholastic philosophical terminology was used but is not a part of the dogma that defined Christ's presence for the Roman Catholic Church at the Council of Trent. In the 13th session of 11 October 1551, it promulgated the following conciliar decree:

[I]f anyone says that the substance of bread and wine remains in the Holy Sacrament of the Eucharist together with the Body and Blood of our Lord Jesus Christ and denies that wonderful and extraordinary change of the whole substance of the wine into His blood, while only the species of bread and wine remain, a change which the Catholic Church has most fittingly called transubstantiation, let him be anathema. (Session 13, can.2).

Protestant views on the concept of Christ's presence in the Eucharist vary significantly from one denomination to another: while many, such as Lutherans, Anglicans, Methodists and the Reformed agree with Roman Catholics that Christ is really present in the Eucharist, they do not accept the definition of transubstantiation to describe it.

According to Thomas Aquinas, in the case of extraordinary Eucharistic miracles in which the appearance of the accidents are altered, this further alteration is not considered to be transubstantiation, but is a subsequent miracle that takes place for the building up of faith. Nor does the extraordinary manifestation alter or heighten the presence of Christ in the Eucharist, as the miracle does not manifest the physical presence of Christ:

[I]n apparitions of this sort [...] the proper species [actual flesh and blood] of Christ is not seen, but a species formed miraculously either in the eyes of the viewers, or in the sacramental dimensions themselves.

Some denominations, especially Lutherans, have similar beliefs regarding the Eucharist and the Real Presence, though they reject the Roman Catholic concept of transubstantiation, preferring instead, the doctrine of the sacramental union, in which:

...the body and blood of Christ are so truly united to the bread and wine of the Holy Communion that the two may be identified. They are at the same time body and blood, bread and wine. [...] In this sacrament the Lutheran Christian receives the very body and blood of Christ precisely for the strengthening of the union of faith.

Lutherans hold that the miracle of the Eucharist is effected during the Words of Institution. Both the Eastern Orthodox Churches and the Oriental Orthodox Churches, such as the Coptic Church, insist "on the reality of the change from bread and wine into the body and the blood of Christ at the consecration of the elements," although they have "never attempted to explain the manner of the change," thus rejecting philosophical terms to describe it. The Methodist Church similarly holds that Christ is truly present in the Eucharist "through the elements of bread and wine," but maintains that how he is present is a Holy Mystery. All Anglicans affirm the real presence of Christ in the Eucharist, though Evangelical Anglicans (as with other Reformed Christians) believe that this is a pneumatic presence, while those of an Anglo-Catholic churchmanship believe this is a corporeal presence, but at the same time questioning the philosophical explanation of transubstantiation.

== History ==
Jesuit scholar Francis Clark traces miracles involving the Eucharist back to the 3rd century, and states that the first miracle to involve a bleeding host was reported in the 5th century.

In 1264, Pope Urban IV instituted the Feast of Corpus Christi. This feast was, according to legend, prompted by the miracle at Bolsena.

== Extraordinary Eucharistic miracles in the Catholic Church ==
The Catholic Church regards every administration of the Eucharist to be a miracle, as in their conception the Eucharist becomes the true body of Christ. The title 'extraordinary Eucharistic miracle' is used to distinguish numerous reported miracles regarding the Eucharist from the miracle of standard transubstantiation. This section describes a variety of events and phenomena that fall under the category of Extraordinary Eucharistic miracles in the Catholic Church.

=== Host becoming flesh and blood ===
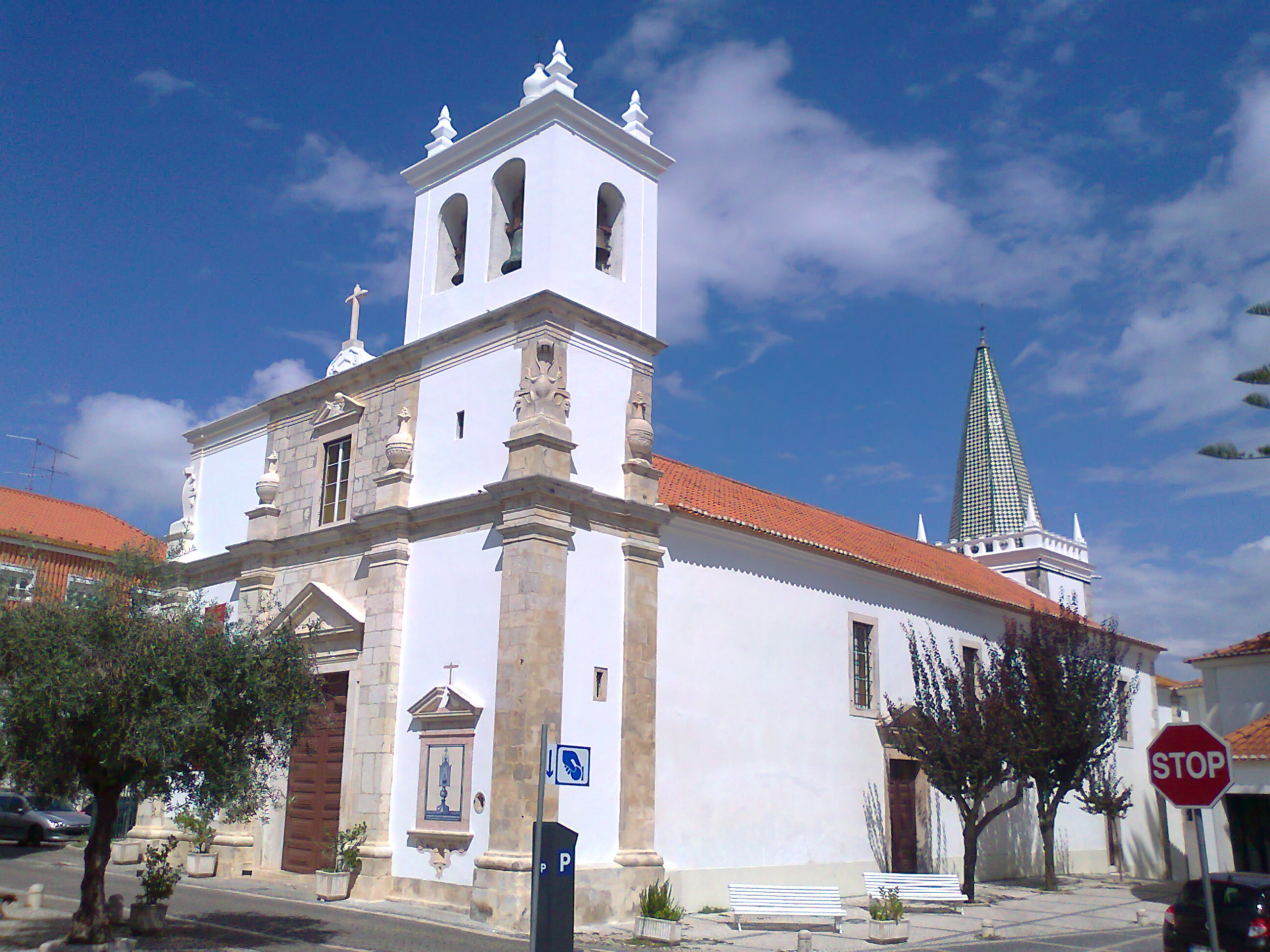
The Sanctuary of the Most Holy Miracle in Santarém, Portugal

One type of Eucharistic miracle is where the Eucharist becomes human flesh as in the miracle of Lanciano which some believe occurred at Lanciano, Italy, in the 8th century, or the Eucharist becomes human blood as in the miracle of Santarém which some believe occurred at Santarém, Portugal, in the 13th century. The Catholic Church officially recognized both miracles as authentic. However, a Eucharistic miracle more commonly reported is that of the bleeding Host, where blood starts to trickle from a consecrated host, the bread consecrated during Mass. Other types of purported miracles include consecrated hosts being preserved for hundreds of years, such as the event of the Miraculous Hosts of Siena.

The Mass at Bolsena, depicted in a famous fresco by Raphael at the Vatican in Rome, was an incident said to have taken place in 1263. A Bohemian priest who doubted the doctrine of transubstantiation celebrated Mass at Bolsena, a town north of Rome. During the Mass the bread of the eucharist began to bleed. The blood from the host fell onto the altar linen in the shape of the face of Jesus as traditionally represented, and the priest came to believe.

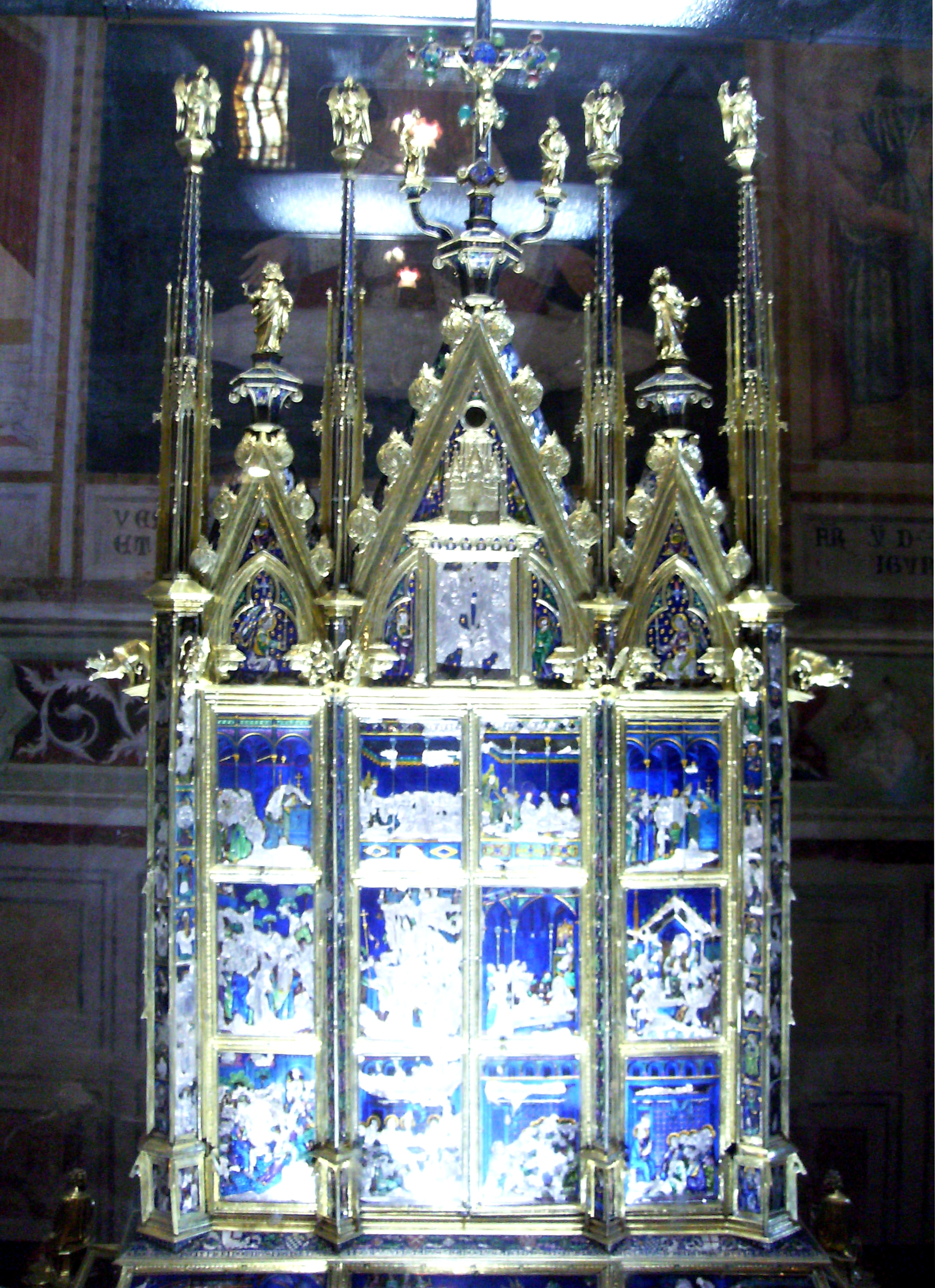
Eucharistic miracle of Bolsena in a reliquary made by Ugolino di Vieri

An alleged 1370 Brussels miracle involves an allegation of host desecration; Jews were accused of desecrating several Hosts, but they miraculously bled and were otherwise unharmed. The Hosts were venerated in later centuries.

Caesarius of Heisterbach recounts various tales of Eucharistic miracles in his book Dialogue on Miracles; most of the stories he tells are from word of mouth. They include Gotteschalk of Volmarstein who saw an infant in the Eucharist, a priest from Wickindisburg who saw the Host turn into raw flesh, and a man from Hemmenrode who saw an image of a crucified Jesus and blood dripping from the Host. All of these images, however, eventually reverted into the Host. Caesarius also recounts more extraordinary tales, such as bees creating a shrine to Jesus after a piece of the Eucharist was placed in a beehive, a church that was burnt to ashes while the pyx containing the Eucharist was still intact, and a woman who found the Host transformed into congealed blood after she stored it in a box.

In 1998, in Venezuela at a convent in Los Teques, a video of the Eucharistic host supposedly bleeding and pulsating like a heart on fire inside its shrine was recorded by pilgrim Daniel Sanford, although skeptics assert that his footage only shows the reflection in the dented metal tray of nearby lamps or votive candles.

In 2016, in Aalst, a small town in Flanders (Belgium), a 200-year-old Eucharistic host in a monstrance suddenly showed blood red color. On 7 July at 17:45 this Eucharistic host spontaneously started coloring, in the presence of several witnesses. The phenomenon occurred in the home of Father Eric Jacqmin, a sedevacantist, who was formerly a member of SSPX. Professor Liesbeth Jacxsens has offered to scientifically investigate the host and thinks the color could be caused by Serratia marcescens, Monilia sitophila or Oidium.

In March 2024, in Chümoukedima, Nagaland, a consecrated host that was not consumed and had been kept for dissolving in water developed a layer from which blood oozed out.

==== Scientific analysis of flesh and blood miracles ====
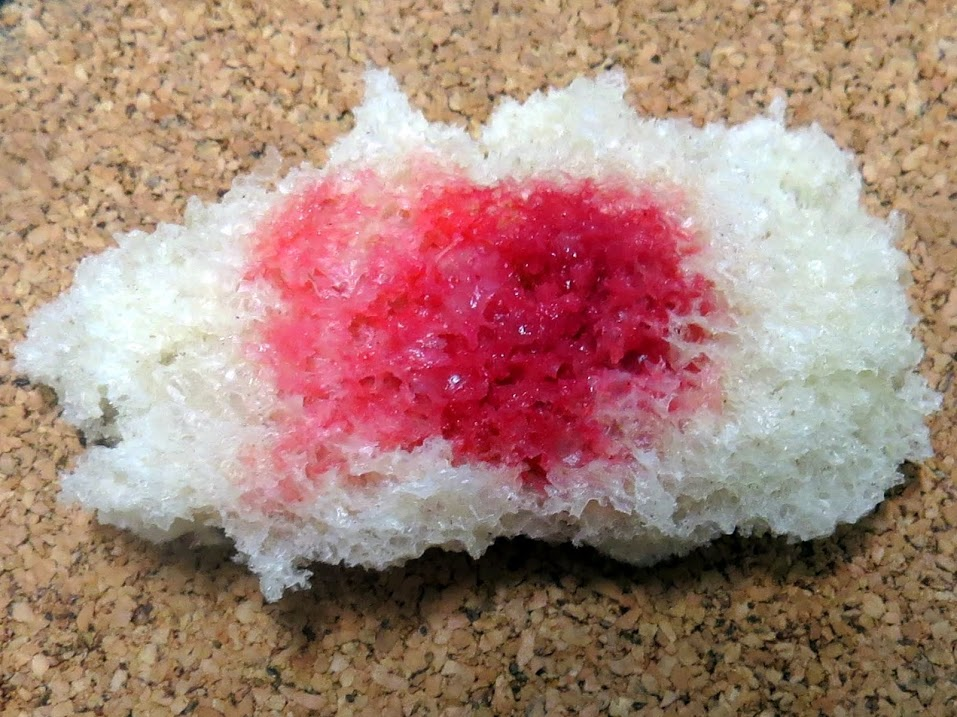
Serratia marcescens growing on a piece of bread

The Catholic Church differentiates between true miracles and occurrences that are explainable by natural causes. For example, in 2006, the Roman Catholic Diocese of Dallas gave over a Eucharist host that turned red while in a glass for the analysis by two University of Dallas biology professors who concluded it was naturally explicable, as Bishop Charles Victor Grahmann wrote that "the object is a combination of fungal mycelia and bacterial colonies that have been incubated within the aquatic environment of the glass during the four-week period in which it was stored in the open air."

In contrast, with regards to the Eucharistic miracle at Sokółka in 2008, according to a 2018 theological essay: "The results of the testing by Professor Maria Sobaniec-Łotowska (from the Department of Medical Pathomorphology, Medical University of Białystok (UMB)) and by Professor Stanisław Sulkowski (from the Department of General Pathomorphology, UMB) are consistent and indicate the presence of human heart tissue with specific pathomorphological changes." The professors wrote an article in Teologia i Człowiek (Theology and Man) stating "the tissue fragments observed under the microscope undoubtedly belong to the human heart and look as if the sample had been taken from the heart of a living person in agony." Further details in the entry were provided that allegedly affirmed the presence of heart muscle, negating a bacterial explanation: "Important evidence that the tested material is the muscle of the human heart was mainly the central arrangement of cell nuclei in the observed fibers, which is a characteristic phenomenon for this muscle. [...] in the electron microscopic examination, clear outlines of inserts and bundles of delicate myocardium were visible." However, the investigation into the Sokółka phenomenon were considered unreliable by other professors like Lech Chyczewski, and top experts claimed the miracle can be scientifically explained. The two researchers who analysed the host were also accused of not following scientific procedures and conducting illegal examinations. Dr. Paweł Grzesiowski stated it was not a miracle, but pure biology, identifying the cause as serratia marcescens. The Medical University of Białystok also officially distancing itself from any claims and results of research conducted by Maria Sobaniec-Lotowska and related employee, and emphasized the institution does not endorse them.

According to an investigation by Rzeczpospolita, the Archbishop Edward Ozorowski sent the host directly to Sobaniec-Łotowska, bypassing standard university protocol which dictates samples be submitted to the department's management. Professor Sobaniec-Łotowska is noted as a public supporter of the Archbishop and a fervent supporter of the Church. Professor Lech Chyczewski, the head of the Department of Medical Pathomorphology at the Medical University of Białystok, stated that "the sample from Sokółka was tested informally." He reportedly issued an official reprimand to Sobaniec-Łotowska, deeming her actions "reprehensible," and clarified that the department did not officially endorse or stand behind these tests.

The Rzeczpospolita report further detailed that Sobaniec-Łotowska and her chosen colleague performed the analyses, but she was reluctant to speak to the newspaper, citing strict secrecy. She released only a general summary report that lacked pictures and provided only a high-level description of a simple histopathological test. This report claimed the sample was heart muscle, but crucially, it did not specify whether its origin was human or animal, and a detailed report of their findings was never released. Contradictorily, her colleague, Professor Sulkowski, in an oral description to the department head, reportedly stated that the nuclei in the sample were not centrally located, a characteristic that would contradict a finding of heart muscle. When questioned by Rzeczpospolita about the arrangement of the nuclei, he also refused to answer, citing secrecy. No other personnel at the University, including Professor Chyczewski, were permitted to view the samples, associated pictures, or a detailed report despite inquiries. Furthermore, the Medical University of Białystok reportedly offered to conduct DNA analysis and further tests on the sample to dismiss any doubts or suspicions, but the Archbishop declined this offer. The Archbishop Ozorowski also did not submit the "miracle" for approval to the Vatican.

From 2020-2021, scientists investigated a 2016 case of a "bleeding host" found at the Franciscan Church of Schwarz in Tyrol, Austria, and released their findings in 2023. They discovered that the red and brown colouring was caused entirely by "bacterial and fungal contamination of the host (wafer)" and "no solid proof of mammalian tissue". DNA analyses failed due to limited material made available, and the friars declined to grant further samples.

Some Catholics have analyzed relics related to Jesus, most prominently miraculous Eucharistic hosts, and purportedly found them to all have the blood type AB. This finding has been used to defend transubstantiation, and to infer that Jesus most likely had AB blood. Catholic scientist Kelly Kearse analysed these claimed shared AB results from various relics, including Eucharist hosts. He discovered they are likely due to bacteria contamination, as AB antigens are not unique to human blood and serological tests cannot distinguish between them. Moreover, he notes none of the AB studies were published in peer-review, and DNA testing would be required to confirm human origin. Kelly Kearse and Stacy Trasancos have both noted scientific problems with Eucharist miracle claims, which includes Lanciano, Buenos Aires, Tixtla, Sokółka, Legnica, and Tyrol—arguing against exaggerations, and for more critical and constructive evaluations, retesting of samples, and much better protocol to investigate occurrences. In 2025, a group of Polish scientists and researchers—which included Tadeusz Dobosz (biolog) and Włodzimierz Wołyniec, similarly demanded rigorous scientific standards and an internationally standardized protocol for evaluating all peri-eucharist phenomena. Including the need for open access to the scientific community and full data transparency in established science journals.

=== Levitating Host ===
According to a local story, a farmer in Bavaria took a consecrated Host from Mass to his house, believing that it would bring him and his family good fortune. However he was plagued by the feeling that what he had done was very wrong and turned to go back to the church to confess his sin. As he turned, the Host flew from his hand, floated in the air and landed on the ground. He searched for it, but he could not see it. He went back accompanied by many villagers and the priest who bent to pick up the Host, having seen it from some distance off. It again flew up into the air, floated, and fell to the ground and disappeared. The bishop was informed and he came to the site and bent to pick up the Host. Again it flew into the air, remained suspended for an extended time, fell to the ground and disappeared.

In 1999, a live TV broadcast in France showed what some have described as a large Eucharistic Host levitating a few inches above another during Mass, although skeptics believe that it shows the bottom bread inside the paten naturally warping and displacing the top bread upwards. The earliest information about the event and footage only surface online years later in 2005 onwards making it unknown if it's authentic, and the illusion could be a web video artefact from the poor picture quality being digitized and reuploaded by third parties.

=== Eucharist surviving fire ===
A story from Amsterdam, 1345, claims that a priest was called to administer Viaticum to a dying man. He told the family that if the man threw up, they were to take the contents and throw it in the fire. The man threw up, and the family did what the priest had advised them to do. The next morning, one of the women went to rake the fire and noticed the Host sitting on the grate, unscathed and surrounded by a light. It had apparently passed into both the man's digestive system and the fire unscathed. The story is commemorated with an annual silent procession through central Amsterdam.

In June 2023, a church in Orlando, Florida burnt down, but while both the altar and the tabernacle were incinerated, a sole Eucharistic Host, covered under the ash, survived the fire.

=== Appearance of images of Jesus ===
Two Eucharistic miracles were reported in the 21st century in Kerala, India, both of which involved an image that resembles Jesus akin to a burnt portrait on bread appearing on consecrated host. One was at Chirattakonam in Kollam district, and the other was at Vilakkannur in Naduvil.

=== Multiplying hosts ===
In 2023, a Catholic church in Thomaston, United States, reported that the hosts they distributed for communion never ran out. The Catholic Church is still investigating the event.

=== Mystical fasting via Eucharist ===
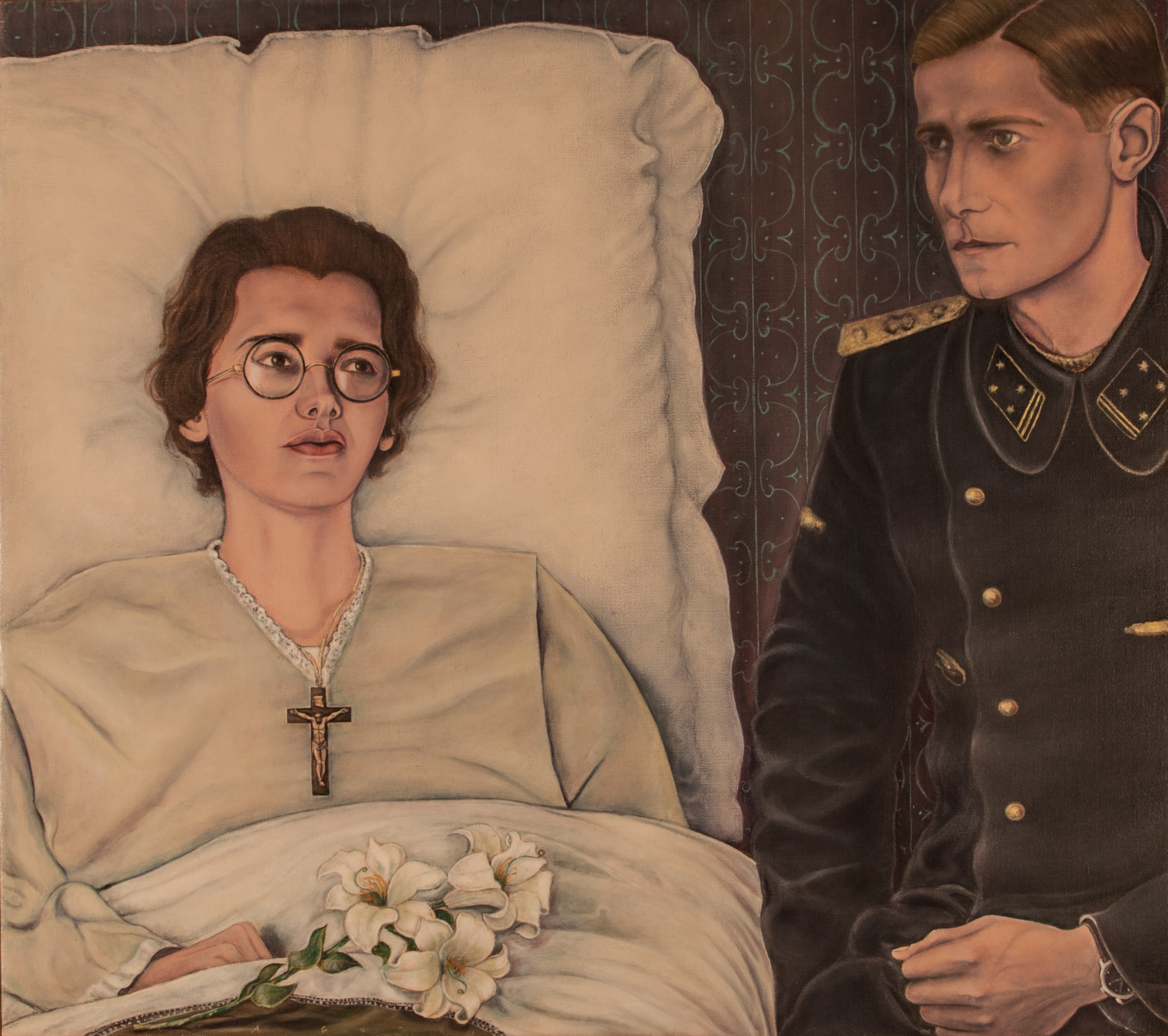
Marthe Robin, a Catholic mystic who reportedly sustained herself on only the Eucharist

Some Catholics have been claimed to survive for years while eating nothing but the Eucharist. Some sources have likened this to the belief of inedia.

Marthe Robin, declared to be Venerable by the church, reportedly fasted from all food and drink except the Eucharist (and drops of liquid meant to moisten her lips) from 1930 to her death in 1981.

Brazilian Servant of God Floripes Dornellas de Jesus reportedly lived for 60 years feeding with Eucharist only.

Teresa Neumann, a Catholic Stigmatic from Bavaria, reportedly subsisted on no food but the Holy Eucharist for decades. From 1927, she ate no food other than daily communion, reportedly keeping this standard until her death in 1962. In a biography written about her she stated that numerous times she attempted to eat other things only to have them regurgitate immediately upon attempting to swallow them.

=== Supernatural reception of Communion ===
Some saints have been reported to receive Holy Communion from angels. One alleged example are the visionaries of Our Lady of Fatima receiving the Eucharist from an angel. The angel, "whiter than snow [...] quite transparent, and as brilliant as crystal in the rays of the sun," proffered the Eucharist host and chalice to the Holy Trinity in reparation for the sins committed against Jesus Christ, then administered the Eucharist to the visionaries and instructed them to make acts of reparation. Another example is Saint Faustina receiving the Eucharist from a seraph. At one time, she saw a dazzling seraph dressed in a gold robe, with a transparent surplice and stole, holding a crystal chalice covered in a transparent veil, which he gave Faustina to drink. At another time, when she was doubting, Jesus and a seraphim appeared before her. She asked Jesus, but when he did not reply, she asked the seraph if he could hear her confession. The seraph replied, "no spirit in heaven has that power" and administered the Eucharist to her.

== In art ==
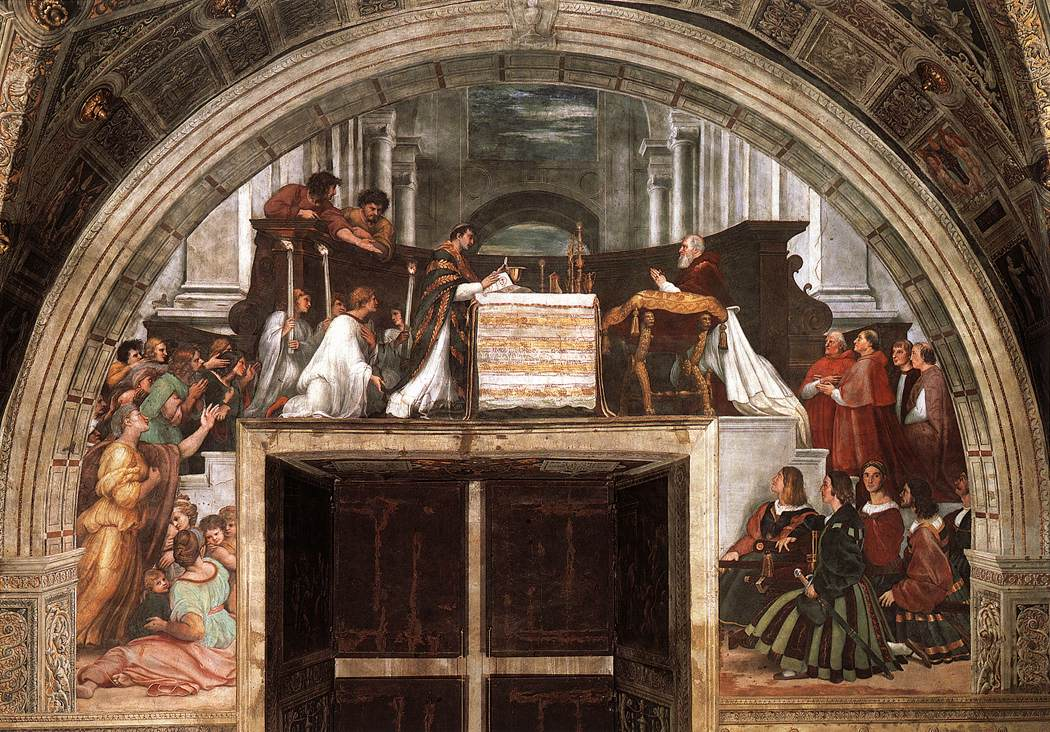
The Mass at Bolsena, fresco of Raphael (1512, in Raphael Rooms of Apostolic Palace, Vatican City)

The Mass of Saint Gregory is a subject of Catholic art that shows Pope Gregory I and others seeing a miraculous vision of Christ after praying for a sign to convince doubters of real presence theology.

Raphael's fresco, The Mass at Bolsena, is a 1512 depiction of an event in Bolsena in the 1200s, where a Bohemian priest doubted the real presence. Blood trickled from the host during mass, thus removing the doubts of the priest.

== List of Eucharistic miracles and Carlo Acutis ==
Carlo Acutis was an Italian Catholic youth and website designer, who is known for documenting numerous Eucharistic miracles and cataloguing over 150 of them onto a website which he created before his 2006 death from leukemia. He was canonized as a Saint in 2025.

== See also ==
- Eucharistic theology
- Epicoccum nigrum
- Forensic genetics
- Histopathology
- Liquefying blood relics
- Monascus purpureus
- Neurospora crassa
- Serratia marcescens – bacteria that grows best in humid environments and sometimes produces red pigmentation (although pink, pink-orange, or orange discolorations are also frequent). The bacteria takes many hours to grow and survives from 3 days to 2 month at most on dry, inanimate surfaces, while the chemical pigment prodigiosin lasts indefinitely
- Weeping statue
