= Sokółka =

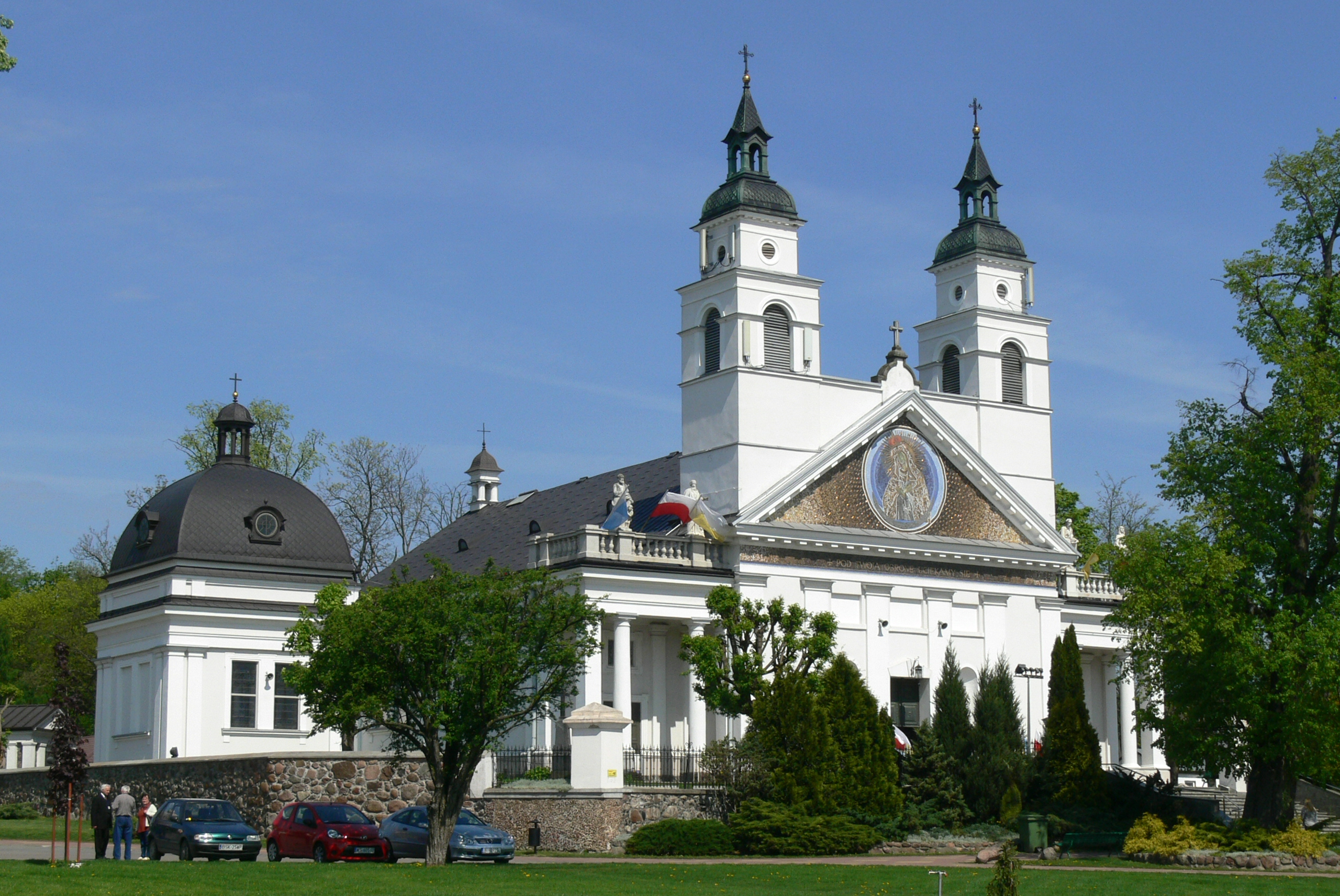
- Neoclassical Saint Anthony of Padua Church in Sokółka

- Flag Coat of arms

- Location within Poland
- Coordinates: 53°24′N 23°30′E
- Country: Poland
- Voivodeship: Podlaskie
- County: Sokółka
- Gmina: Sokółka
- Established: 15th century
- Town rights: 1609

Area
  - Total: 18.61 km^{2} (7.19 sq mi)

Population (2012)
  - Total: 18 974
  - Density: 0.97/km^{2} (2.5/sq mi)
- Time zone: UTC+1 (CET)
  - Summer (DST): UTC+2 (CEST)
- Postal code: 16-100
- Vehicle registration: BSK
- Website: www.sokolka.pl

Sokółka (Note: Polish: pronounced [sɔˈkuu̯ka]; Belarusian: Саку́лка, Yiddish: סאקאלקע, romanized: Sokolke) is a town in northeastern Poland, seat of the Sokółka County in Podlaskie Voivodeship. It is a busy rail junction located on the international Warsaw–Białystok–Grodno line, with additional connections which go to Suwałki and the Lithuanian border.

== History ==
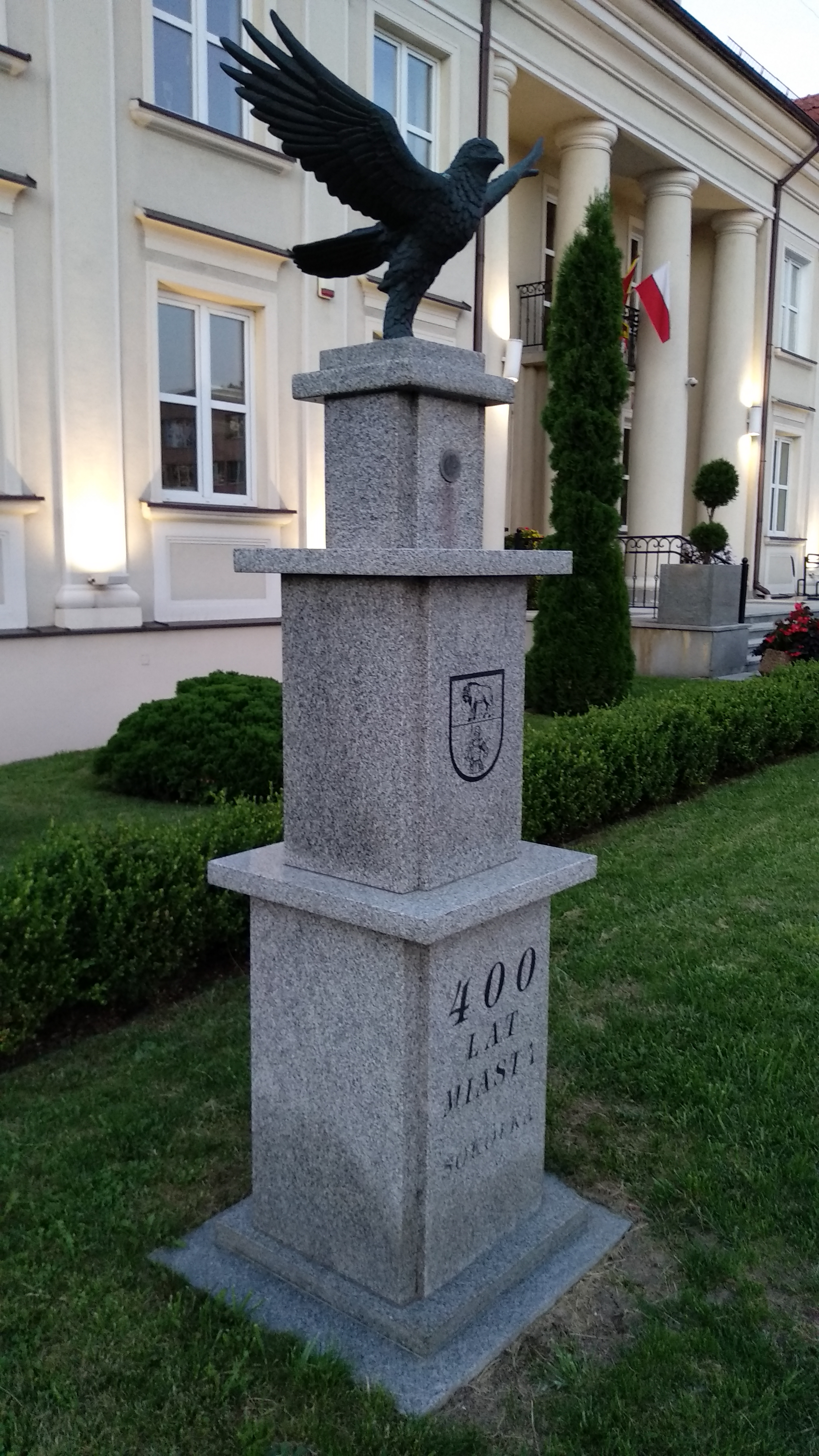
Monument commemorating the 400th anniversary of receiving town rights

The settlement was founded as a royal village located on the route connecting Knyszyn and Grodno. Sokółka was granted town rights by King Sigismund III Vasa in 1609. The town's layout with its central square is attributed to starost Antoni Tyzenhauz.

In the Third Partition of Poland, in 1795, the town was annexed by Prussia, and in 1807 it passed to the Russian Partition of Poland. In 1861, Walery Wróblewski came to Sokółka and founded a secret organization in preparation for a Polish uprising, which broke out in 1863. He was one of the main organizers of the January Uprising in the territory between Białystok and Grodno. He organized an insurgent unit and commanded in many battles in the region, and eventually became one of the leaders of the uprising for the entire Białystok and Grodno regions. Sokółka was one of the sites of Russian executions of Polish insurgents during the January Uprising.

In 1873 Sokolka was the birthplace of Alexander Bogdanov, polymath and revolutionary, who was a serious rival to Lenin for leadership of the Bolshevik Party in its early years.

Following World War I, in 1918, Poland regained independence and control of the town.

In the course of the Soviet invasion of Poland at the start of World War II, Sokółka was captured by the Red Army on 21 September 1939, and then occupied by the Soviet Union under which it was annexed into the Byelorussian SSR on 14 November 1939. It was administered as a part of the Belastok Region of the Byelorussian SSR. Several Poles from Sokółka, including the town's mayor, were murdered by the NKVD in the large Katyn massacre in April–May 1940. Sokółka was under German occupation from June 1941 until 24 July 1944. It was administered as a part of the Bialystok District of Nazi Germany. The Germans established the Sokółka Ghetto for the imprisonment of Polish Jews. The ghetto served as staging point for deportations to death camps during the Holocaust similar to most Jewish ghettos across the occupied country. The Jews of all surrounding villages and towns including Krynki, Janów, Czyżew, and Zaręby Kościelne were kept there. In total, 8,000–9,000 people were murdered. The main synagogue was destroyed. The Jewish community was not restored.

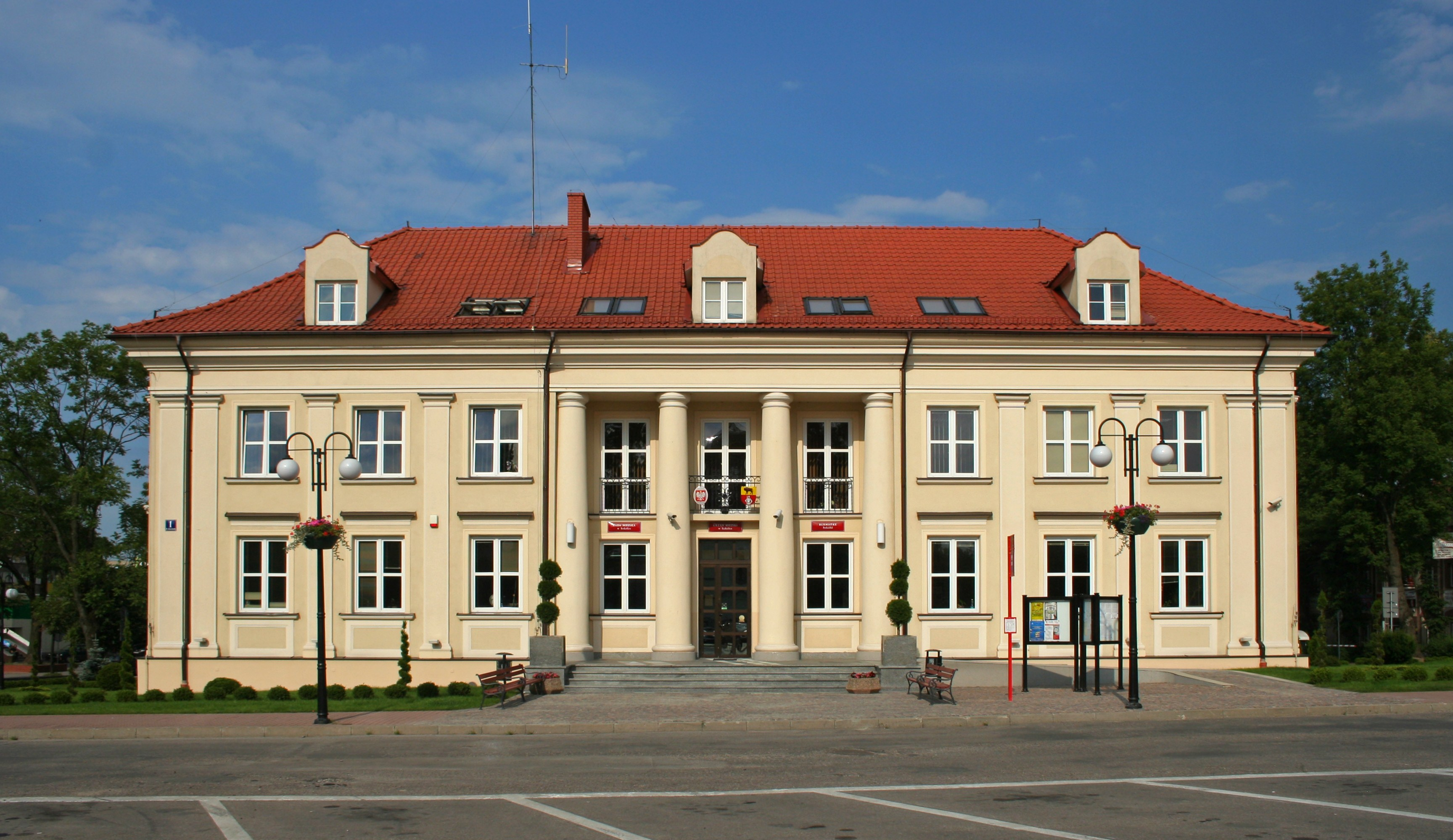
Town hall

On 24 July 1944, troops of the 2nd Belorussian Front of the Red Army dislodged the German occupying forces from the town. Its administration reverted initially to the Byelorussian SSR, but on 16 August 1945, it was restored to Poland. Administratively it was located in the "large" Białystok Voivodeship until 1975, then the "small" Białystok Voivodeship until 1998.

== Sights ==
The sights of Sokółka include the Museum of Sokółka Land (Muzeum Ziemi Sokólskiej), historic townhouses and the historic churches: the Catholic church of St. Anthony built in a neoclassical style in 1848, and the St. Alexander Newski's Orthodox Church from 1830.

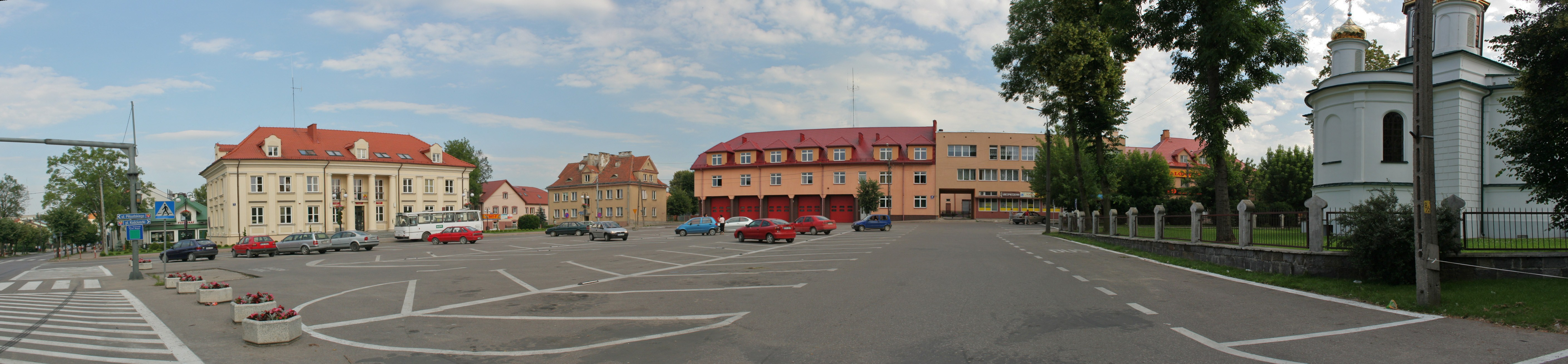
Kościuszko square in Sokółka with the town hall to the left and Saint Alexander Nevsky Orthodox Church to the right

== Eucharistic miracle ==
On October 12, 2008, a Eucharistic miracle was said to have taken place in the Saint Anthony of Padua Church in Sokółka. During Sunday mass, a consecrated Host fell on the floor and developed a red stain after spending a week in a container with water.

== Transport ==
Sokółka is located on the S19 highway, parts of which (including the local part) are still under construction (as of 2021). There is also a train station in the town.

== Sports ==
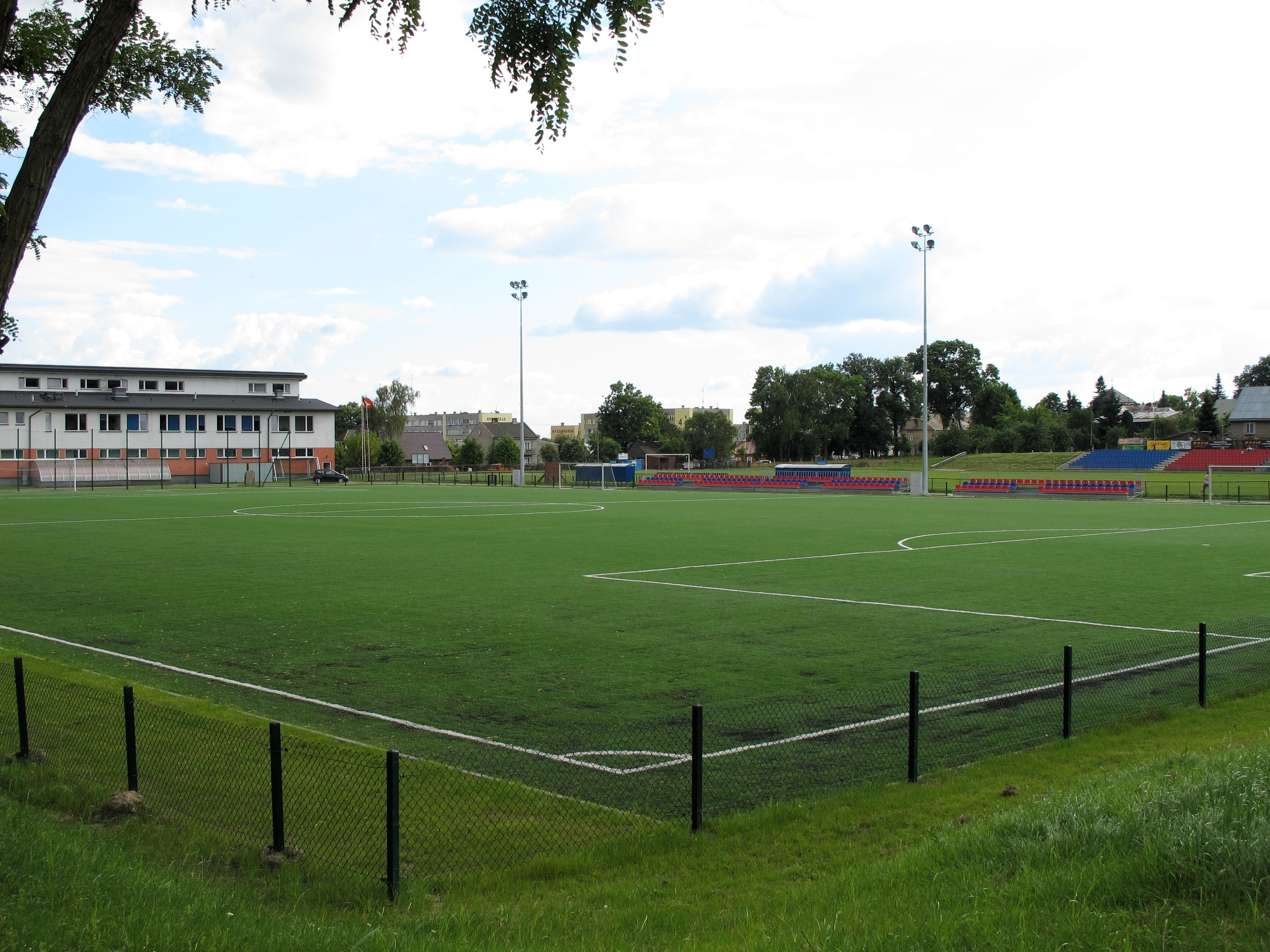
Stadium OSiR in Sokółka

The local football club is Sokół Sokółka. It competes in the lower leagues.

== Notable people ==
- Marcin Białobłocki (born 1983), cyclist
- Alexander Bogdanov (1873-1928), Soviet revolutionary, physician, philosopher, writer
- Leonard Drożdżewicz (born 1960), notary, columnist, publisher and social activist
- Jan Pawłowski (born 1992), footballer
- Diana Sokołowska (born 1996), swimmer, Olympic participant

== Twin towns—sister cities ==
Sokółka is twinned with:

- Rochlitz, Germany
- Šalčininkai, Lithuania
