= Miracle of Calanda =

1640 event that allegedly took place in Calanda, Spain

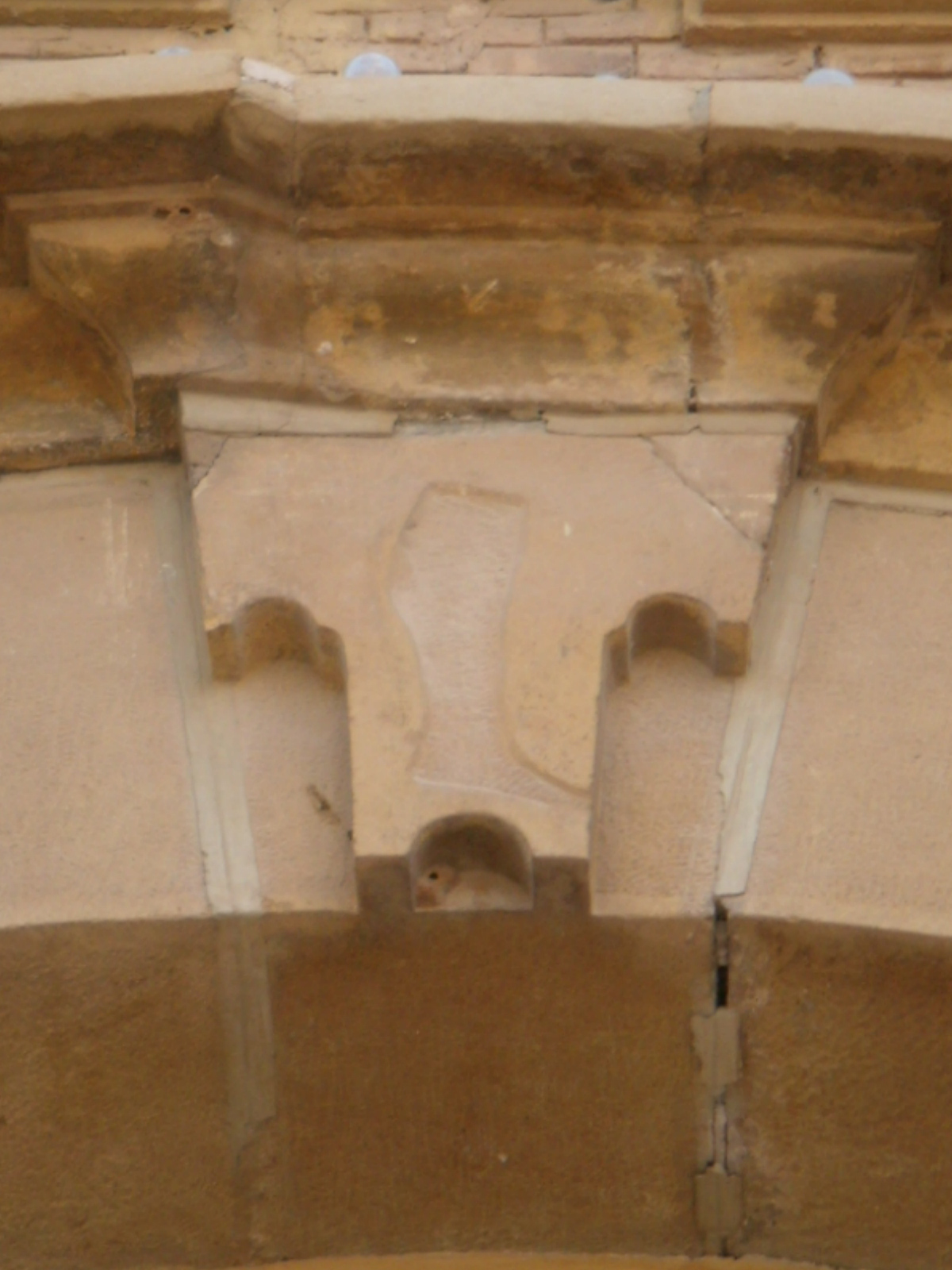
Sculpted image of the leg of Miguel Pellicer in an arch of the Templo del Pilar in Calanda

The Miracle of Calanda is an event that allegedly took place in Calanda, Spain in 1640, according to 17th century documents. The documents state that a young farmer's leg was miraculously restored to him after having been amputated two and a half years earlier. This event is described in detail in the book Il Miracolo by Christian author and journalist Vittorio Messori. The following article is principally based on the account in Messori's book.

== Background ==
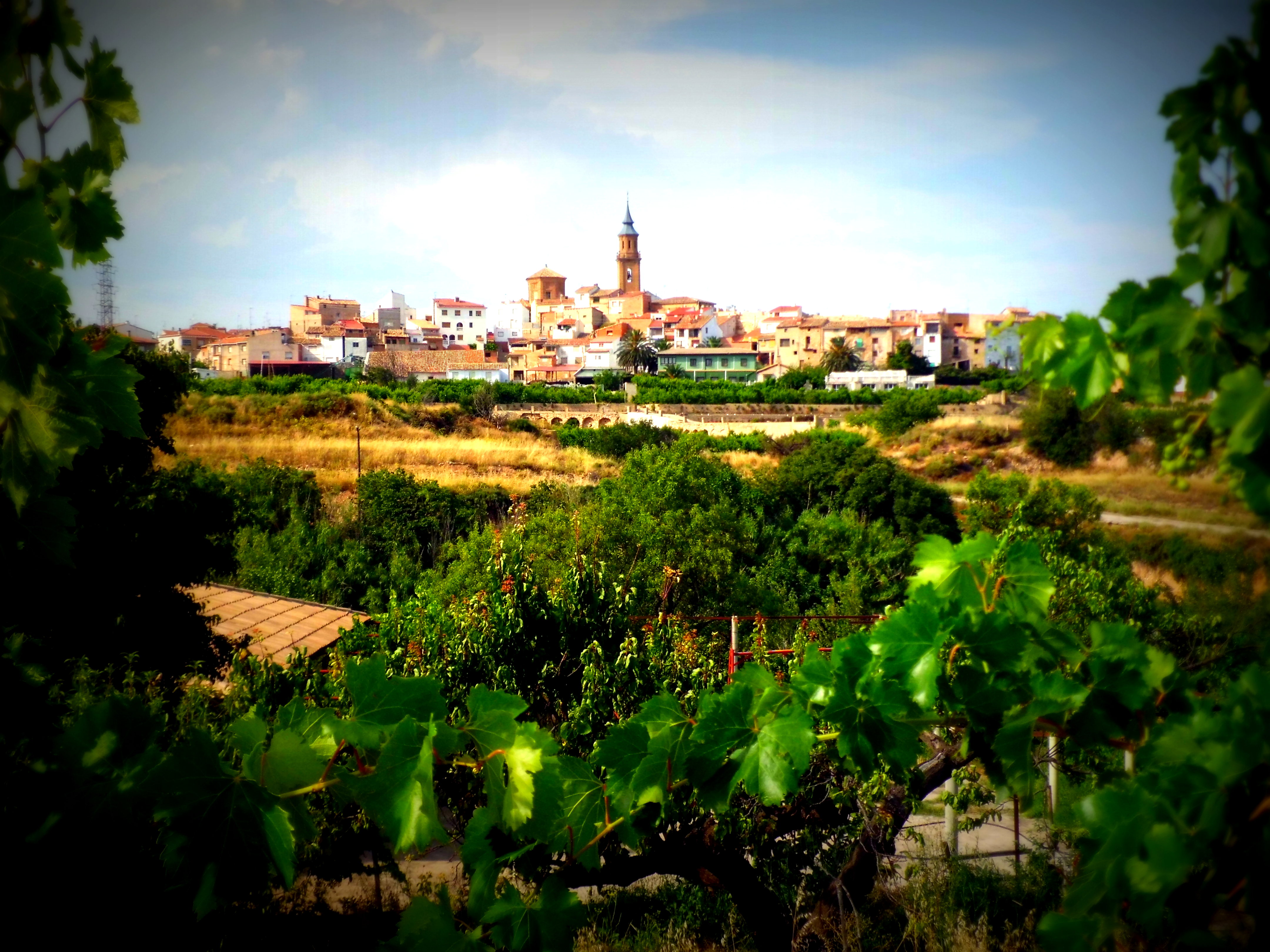
Calanda, Spain

At the end of July 1637, Miguel Pellicer (1617–1647), a 20-year-old man from Calanda in Aragon was working as an agricultural labourer at Castellón, 60 km from Valencia, on his uncle's farm. While steering a cart by riding one of the mules that was pulling it, Miguel fell off, probably because he had fallen asleep. The cartwheel passed over his right leg, breaking the tibia. He received initial treatment at Castellón, then was admitted to the hospital of Valencia, where he stayed for five days. He then decided to leave for Zaragoza in order to receive treatment in the hospital dedicated to Our Lady of the Pillar to whom he had great devotion. The 300 kilometre journey took him some 50 days.

On his arrival, the leg was in an advanced state of gangrene, leaving no other choice but to amputate it. In their testimony, the doctors described the leg as "very phlegmonous and gangrenous," to the point of appearing "black." In mid-October two master surgeons, Juan de Estanga and Diego Millaruelo, carried out the operation. The leg was cut "four fingers below the knee." Although they had made the patient drowsy with alcoholic and drugged drinks, as was the practice at the time, Miguel suffered excruciating pain: "In his torment," the witnesses would later say, "the young man called upon the Virgin of the Pillar, unceasingly and with great fervor." The leg was then buried, as was customary at the time, in a special part of the hospital's cemetery. The stub was subsequently cauterized with fire.

Miguel Juan Pellicer stayed in hospital for a few months, until in the spring of 1638 he was provided with a wooden leg and crutches and released from hospital. For the next two years, he made his living through begging. He was provided with the necessary authorization, at the Sanctuary of the Pillar. During this time he was certainly a familiar sight for a large number of the citizens of Zaragoza. He regularly returned to the hospital for checkups and treatment through Dr. Estanga.

Every evening he would ask the servants in the sanctuary for a bit of the oil that burnt in the lamp and use it as ointment to rub in the stub of his leg, with the conviction that he would so be able to draw the aid of the Virgin upon him. In the first months of 1640, now 23 years old, he decided to return to his parents at Calanda. After about one week's travel he arrived during the second week of Lent, i.e. between March 11 and 14. Unable to help in working on the fields, he once again took up begging, going around the neighbouring villages on donkey's back. Many people at the time must have witnessed that his lower leg was missing.

== Restoration of Pellicer's legs ==
According to Messori, at about ten o'clock in the evening of 29 March 1640, Pellicer laid himself to rest. Because his bed was occupied by a soldier of a garrison that stayed at Calanda over night, he went to sleep on a provisional bed in his parents' room. Between half past ten and eleven o'clock, his mother entered the room and saw two feet appearing from below the cloak that covered her son. Thinking that Miguel Juan and the soldier must have changed places, she called her husband to resolve the misunderstanding. But while removing the cloak, husband and wife, were dumbstruck, as they realized that this was indeed their own son. They shook him and shouted at him to wake him up. Some minutes passed until Miguel Juan woke up from a deep sleep. He told them that he had dreamt of being within the Sanctuary of Our Lady of the Pillar and rubbing his leg with the holy oil, as he had done so often. Soon all three agreed that the restoration of the leg was due to the intercession of the Virgin of the Pillar.

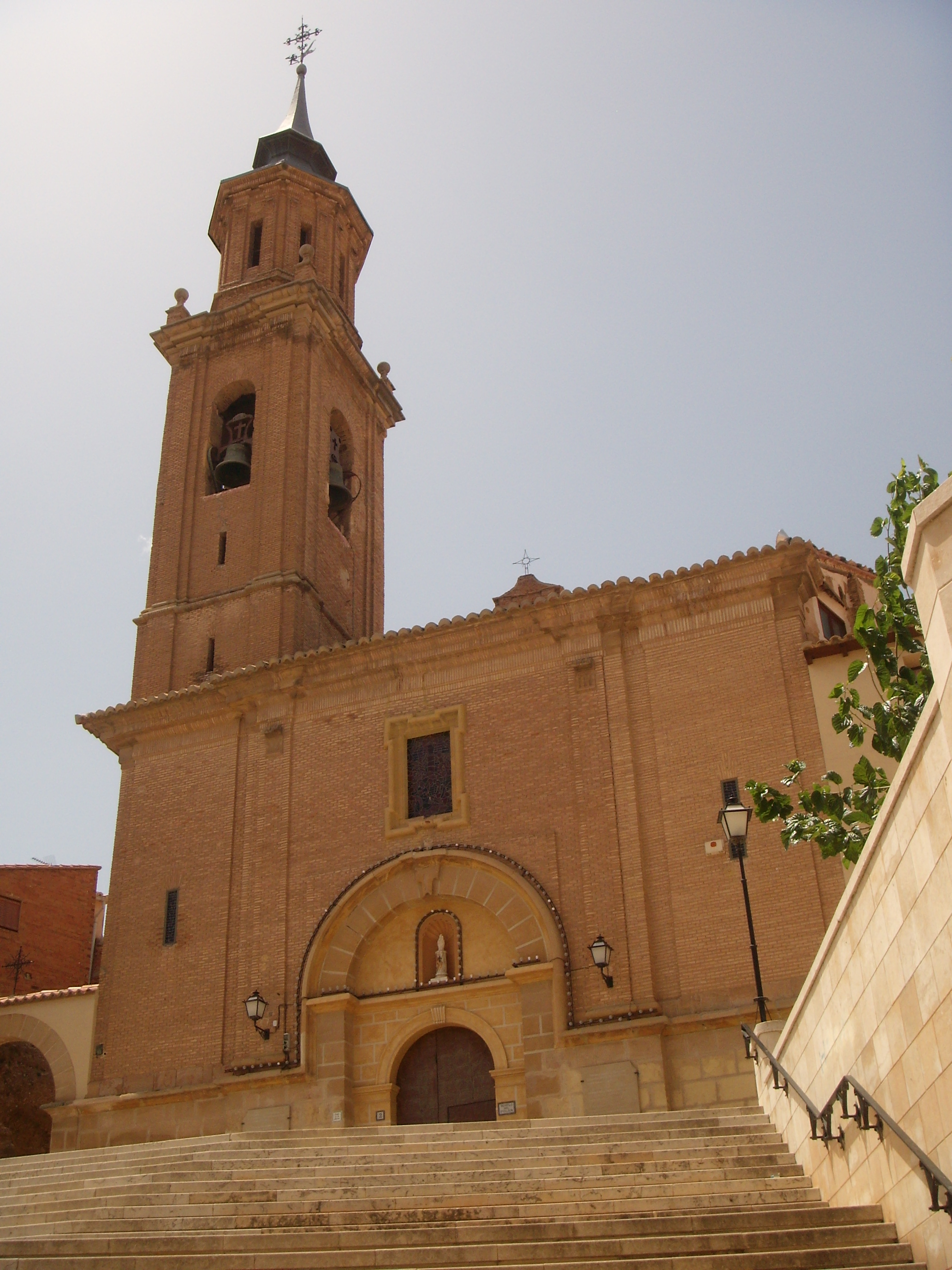
Templo del Pilar (Calanda)

News of the event immediately spread through Calanda. The following morning the local judge, assisted by two surgeons, examined Pellicer and set up a report which he immediately sent to his superiors. On April 1, Palm Sunday, Don Marco Seguer, parish priest of Mazaleón, a village fifty kilometres away, went to the place of the event, accompanied by the royal notary Miguel Andréu, who set up a certificate to express the testimony, confirmed by oath, of ten persons.

== Thanksgiving and inquiry ==
Messori continues, on April 25 Pellicer and his parents went on a pilgrimage to Zaragoza to give thanks to Our Lady of the Pillar, and here too the young man was seen by a great number of people who had known him before with only one leg. Following a request from the city's authority, a formal inquiry was initiated in order to ascertain the veracity of the event. Legal proceedings, presided by the archbishop of the city began on June 5 and took about a year. All hearings were public and no voice of dissent was recorded. Twenty-four witnesses spoke out, selected as the most trustworthy from among the great number of people that knew Pellicer, both from Calanda and from Zaragoza.

On April 27, 1641, the archbishop of Zaragoza pronounced a judgment, thereby officially declaring the authenticity of the miracle. At the end of the year Pellicer was also invited to the royal court at Madrid, where King Philip IV knelt down before him and kissed the leg. Recordings also show that the restored leg was the same one as that which had been amputated two and a half years before, for it could be reidentified through some bruises and scars that were there before the amputation. Also, the hole in the cemetery of the hospital of Zaragoza in which the leg had been buried was excavated and found empty.

In the appendix of his book, Vittorio Messori also reports the opinion of Landino Cugola, primary surgeon of the hospital of the University of Verona, a specialist in limb replantation. Cugola has carefully studied the testimonies given in the recordings of the proceedings at Zaragoza, which reveal that the leg, after it had only just been restored, was cold and hard with contracted toes and blue in colour. Hence, Pellicer was not yet able to put his weight on it and still had to move around on crutches. After a few days the leg regained in strength and the toes were stretched out again. Also, the leg was initially a few centimetres shorter due to the loss of bone tissue that was caused by the fracture, but within about three months it regained its original length. According to Cugola, all this is in perfect accordance with the normal development following the replantation of a leg, although the growth of tissue is usually supported by exerting a pull onto the limb. In Pellicer's case this was not necessary.

== Documentation ==
Vittorio Messori also lists and provides details of documents from the time which attest the miracle of Calanda, the most important ones being:

- The certificate set up by the notary Andréu. The original document, which fortunately escaped destruction in the Spanish Civil War, is on display in a glass case in the town hall of Zaragoza.
- The minutes of the proceedings at Zaragoza. The original document, having been kept in the archives of Zaragoza chapter house, was handed over to a Benedictine monk, Father Lambert, in about 1930, who then took it to France. Unfortunately, Lambert was killed in World War II and it is unknown what has become of the manuscript since. However, before it disappeared four printed editions had been published, the first of which in 1829. Two notaries certified that these corresponded exactly with original text.
- Two certified copies of the minutes of the proceedings, set up at the same day as the original. They were signed and sealed by the same notaries. One was kept in the archives of the town of Zaragoza, but burnt in 1808 during the Napoleonic wars. The other is still extant and is kept in the archives of the Cathedral of the Pillar.
- The report of Calanda's local judge, set up on the morning immediately after the event. It has not survived to our time, but documentary traces confirm that there was such a report.

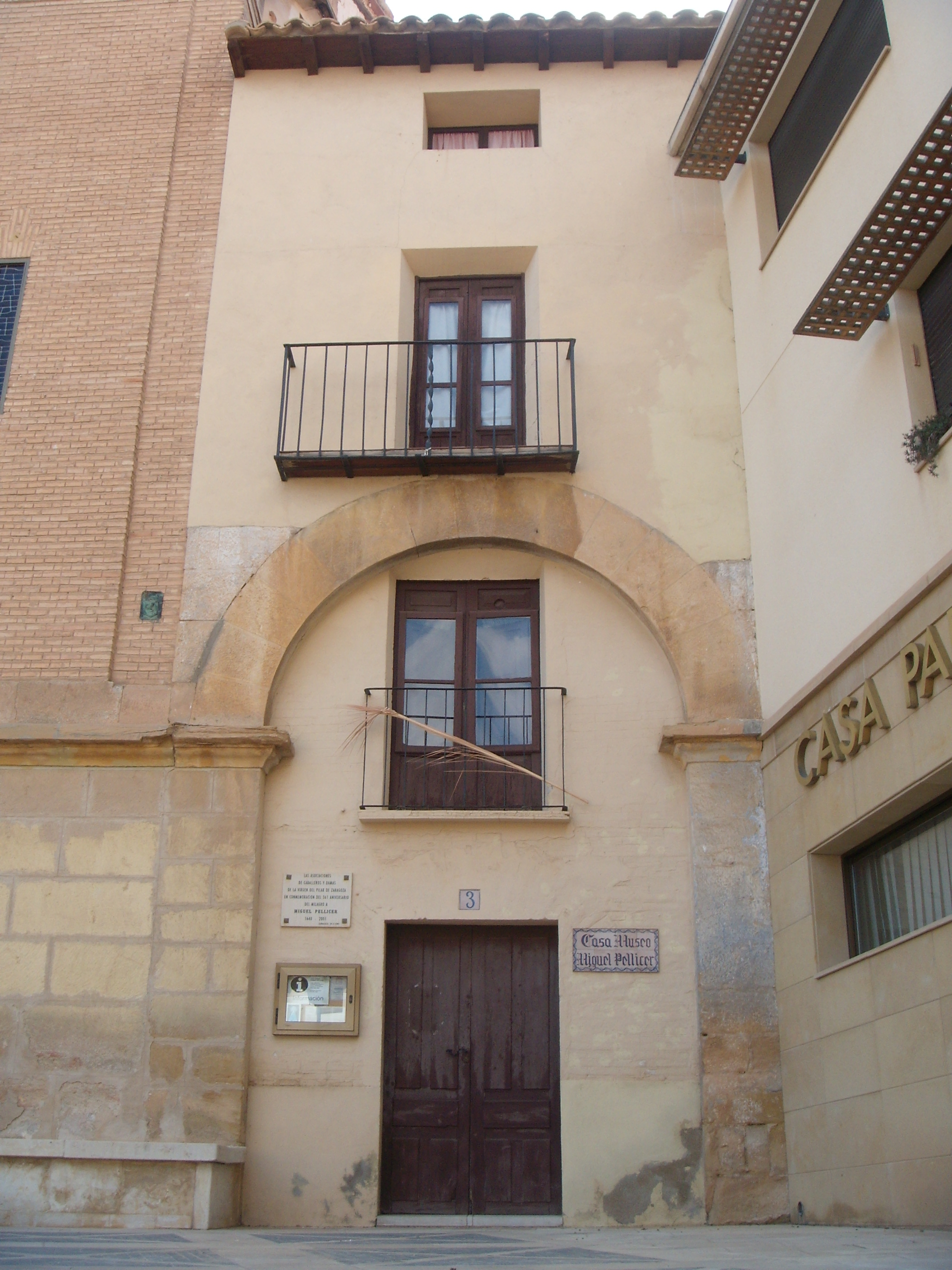
Casa-Museo Miguel Pellicer (Calanda)

Other documents of lesser importance:

- The certificate of baptism of Miguel Juan Pellicer.
- The registration of his admittance to the hospital of Valencia.
- A small booklet written by a Carmelite friar, commissioned by the chapter house of the Pillar, and published in 1641.
- Another book, published by a German doctor in 1642. The Jesuit father who gave the imprimatur added a declaration in which he affirmed that he personally knew Pellicer, first with one leg and then with two.
- The account of the audience of Miguel Juan Pellicer at the royal court of Madrid.
- A number of other documents which confirm the existence of other persons involved in the event.

Messori's comment:

"By far the majority of past events (including the more important ones) is attested with less documentary proof and official warrantee. This is an objective statement of fact, not apologetic reassurance." pp. 136-137

== Alternative explanations ==
Sergio de Santis in his review of Messori's book for CICAP, challenged why such a "sensational" case for a miracle which seems to directly answer Anatole France's statement on the ex-voto offerings—"I see many crutches, but no wooden legs"—was completely forgotten by the Church for three and a half centuries. De Santis argued that this miracle story's prolonged obscurity suggests the "granite-like" evidence presented by Messori is not as solid as claimed. The reason being this story sat virtually ignored and unpromoted by ecclesiastical authorities for over 350 years after the initial devotion.

Luigi Garlaschelli another member of the Italian Committee for the Investigation of Claims on Pseudosciences, has advanced the hypothesis that Miguel Juan Pellicer was a malingerer who hid his leg by keeping it folded behind his thigh; discovered by the soldier who was sleeping in the house, he would have staged the miracle to avoid having to admit the deception. In support of this, Garlaschelli reports the first words of Pellicer which were "My Father, forgive me!" instead of a more spontaneous "Miracle! Miracle!". The situation then got out of hand for the family who, once the news of the miracle spread with the arrival of witnesses and officials of the Holy Inquisition, had to continue along the same line to avoid being condemned for fraud themselves. This hypothesis requires that the surgeons and nurses at the Zaragoza hospital who performed the amputation and who testified at the trial confused Pellicer with someone else. Garlaschelli argues that in a large hospital, with so many patients admitted every day, it's unlikely that the staff, after more than two years, would have remembered one patient from so many. He also notes that Pellicer never showed up in Calanda with his broken leg, but despite having to travel between Valencia and Zaragoza and Calanda being on the way, he preferred to go through Teruel. Garlaschelli also states that in the first few days, the "reattached" leg appeared "thin, contracted, and bluish," as if it had atrophied from prolonged disuse.

Another proposed hypothesis by Garlaschelli is that of mistaken identity, whereby Pellicer was impersonated by a relative, such as one of his brothers. While Vittorio Messori countered that none of his relatives were twin brothers, the canonical trial protocol does not mention any of his seven brothers, only recording the testimony from a single sister.

Author Brian Dunning proposes his own version of what might have happened, though he admits: "We can't say that the Miracle of Calanda is not genuine, and we can't prove that Miguel Juan Pellicer's leg was not miraculously restored. But we can say the evidence we have falls short, and is perfectly consistent with no miracle having taken place." He also claims that "there is no documentation or witness accounts confirming his leg was ever gone." Dunning presents an alternative explanation in which Pellicer's leg did not develop gangrene during the five days at the hospital at Valencia. Instead, he spent the next 50 days convalescing, during which he was unable to work, and so turned to begging, and discovered that having a broken leg was a boon. After his leg had mended, Dunning proposes Pellicer decided that if a broken leg helped, a missing leg would be even better. Traveling to Zaragoza, he bound his right foreleg up behind his thigh and for two years played the part of an amputee beggar. Later, back at his parents home in Calanda, forced to sleep in a different bed, his ruse was discovered, and the story of the miracle was a way to save face. Dunning asserts "that no evidence exists that his leg was ever amputated—or that he was even treated at all—at the hospital in Zaragoza other than his own word. He named three doctors there, but for some reason there is no record of their having been interviewed by either the delegation or the trial."

Though according to the transcription of the canonical process, two surgeons involved, Juan de Estanga and Diego Millaruelo were interviewed, as well as the assistant surgeon Juan Lorenzo Garcia, and the hospital's priest overseer Pascual del Cacho. All had said, under oath, that the leg of Miguel Pellicer was really amputated.

The Skeptoid article by Brian Dunning has subsequently published a correction to the original 2011 article. In the correction, it is updated that: "Two doctors named by Pellicer (Estanga and Millaruelo) were interviewed in the trial. However, neither said they'd been involved with the amputation of his leg".

Contrary to this statement, the canonical transcript seems to indicate that Estanga was involved with the medical care and surgery of Miguel Pellicer:

Licentiate Juan de Estanga applied the various medicines to him, and seeing that they did not appropriate them, he knows, and this depository saw that the said Licentiate Juan de Estanga resolved to cut off said leg, because he found no other remedy for the said [Miguel] Juan Pellicero [...] [Diego Millaruelo] helped the execution, and saw it cut off, and this he said to be true per juramentum [under oath].

Skeptoid would go on to criticize the trial itself as biased, and being held with a predetermined conclusion to prove something miraculous had taken place, same with the making of the Church’s transcripts. Dunning posited that none of this was done to genuinely investigate what had actually occurred.

Spanish historian Antonio Gascón Ricao and rationalist Angel Martinez considered the purported events as pious fraud created by the local Church and municipal authorities. They highlighted potential socio-political motivations behind the trial conducted under archbishop Pedro Apaolaza Ramírez. Such as the events occurring during the Franco-Spanish War and Catalan Revolt in the 1640s, and would serve to boost morale and Marian devotion to Our Lady of Pillar, unifying the region and establishing royal and religious authority as the apparition was declared patroness of Zaragoza in 1642. They also highlight Pellicer's subsequent life as a traveling alms solicitor, living a life of vagrancy and begging until his death at age 30. Ricao claimed discrepancies existed between the parish death registers and the official devotional accounts published by Pedro Neurath in 1642 who was promoting it to support the apparition. The logs from 1637-1640 were said to lack any proof of amputation, and the medical testimony presented during the 1641 trial judgement was retrofitted after and not drawn from any clinical logs prior. Ricao also discusses when officials in the 1640s exhumed the supposed amputated leg from the hospital cemetery where Juan Lorenzo Garcia claimed to bury it, no buried limb was ever recovered, which he takes as further proof for the lack of forensic rigor and the inversion of evidence by the investigators.

The Calanda miracle was engaged with by Anglican theologians Conyers Middleton and bishop John Douglas in the 18th century. David Hume also critiqued the Calanda miracle in his Essay Concerning Miracles, incorporated into his Philosophical Essays Concerning Human Understanding (1748), republished as An Enquiry Concerning Human Understanding (1758). Hume based his objections on an account by Cardinal de Retz, and recognized it as a case having numerous testimonies, but should still be rejected by rationalists as under natural laws it is far more likely human credulity, deception, or exaggeration took place.

Between April and May of 1950, Rigoberto Doménech Valls authorized an exhumation of Pellicer's remains at the parish cemetery in Velilla de Ebro. It was supervised by medical professors from the University of Zaragoza, and the examination uncovered a skeleton with both right and left leg bones inside. The measurements showed that the right tibia was 5 mm shorter than the left. Additionally, 17th-century shoes recovered from the burial contained asymmetrical orthopedic insoles, with the right insole featuring a significantly thicker lift to compensate. The examiners concluded the remains belonged to an individual with a deformity rather than an amputee.

== Bibliography ==
- Vittorio Messori (2000): Il miracolo. BUR, pp. 272 ISBN 88-17-25871-7.
- Läpple, Alfred (1989): Wunder sind Wirklichkeit, pp. 129–31.
- Copia literal y auténtica del proceso, y sentencia de calificacion sobre milagro obrado por la intercesion de Nuestra Señora del Pilar en la Villa de Calanda ... Imprenta de Francisco Magallon. 1829.
- Sbalchiero, Patrick: Calanda, miracle dit de. in: Sbalchiero (ed.)(2002): Dictionnaire des miracles et de l'extraordinaire Chrétiens. Edition Fayard.
- Gascón Ricao, Antonio; Briongos Martínez, Ángel (2015). El milagro de Calanda: La génesis de un mito [The miracle of the cripple of Calanda: The genesis of a myth] (in Spanish).
