= José Luis Abellán =

Spanish philosopher (1933–2023)

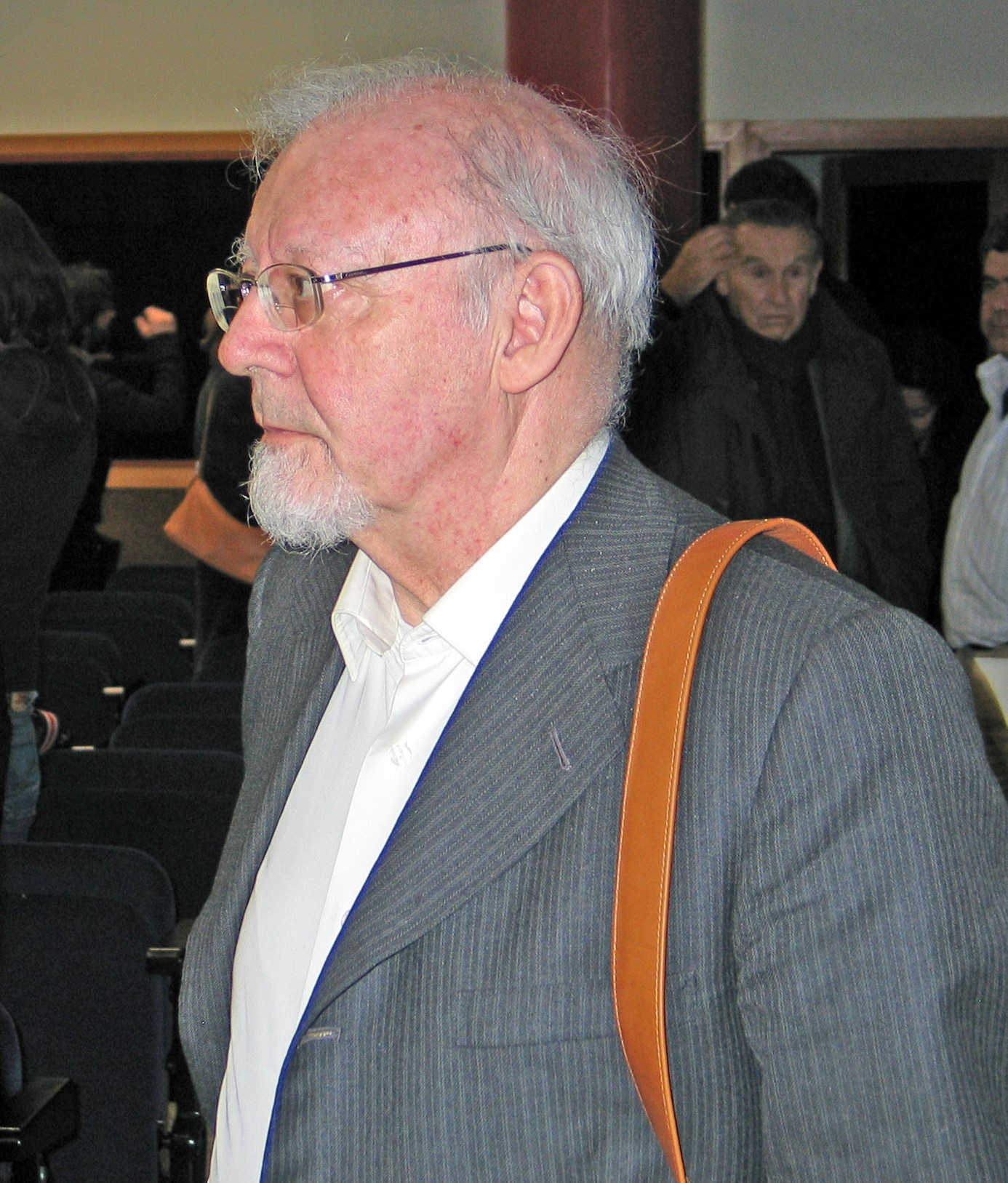
- Abellán in 2007
- Born: José Luis Abellán García-González; May 19, 1933; Madrid, Spanish Republic
- Died: December 17, 2023 (aged 90); Madrid, Spain
- Occupations: Writer, philosopher, historian

José Luis Abellán (19 May 1933 – 17 December 2023) was a Spanish philosopher. He died on 17 December 2023, at the age of 90.

== Biography ==
=== Early life ===
Son of the Madrid lawyer José Abellán-García y Pérez de Camino. He lived until the age of fourteen in Ávila. In 1947, his family moved to Madrid, where his father opened a law firm. He had two siblings, María Jesús and Javier.

=== Academic training ===
He studied secondary education at the Instituto Nacional de Enseñanza Media of Ávila and at the Instituto Ramiro de Maeztu, where Father Manuel Mindán Manero guided him towards the study of Philosophy. After obtaining his licentiate degree (1957), he earned a PhD in Philosophy from the Complutense University of Madrid with the doctoral thesis Miguel de Unamuno a la luz de la psicología ("Miguel de Unamuno in the light of psychology"), directed by José Luis López Aranguren, in 1960. He was a research fellow at the Instituto Luis Vives de Filosofía of the CSIC between 1959 and 1961. He also earned a diploma in Psychology (1961).

=== Teaching career ===
He taught in Puerto Rico, in Northern Ireland, and later as a professor at the Complutense University of Madrid, where he served as Chair of the History of Spanish Philosophy until his retirement in 2003. He was a member of the Executive Board of UNESCO (1983–1986) in Spain and in Paris (1983–1985), representing Spain, and president of the "Confederación Española de Clubs UNESCO". He also presided over the Ateneo Científico, Literario y Artístico de Madrid (2001–2009) and was a professor and lecturer at numerous universities in Europe and the Americas. His most important work is Historia crítica del pensamiento español (7 volumes, 1979–1991), in which he synthesized the evolution of ideas and philosophy in Spain from the Roman era, and he is also noted for his studies on Erasmianism. He has also written monographs on Miguel de Unamuno, José Ortega y Gasset, María Zambrano, George Santayana, Antonio Machado and José Gaos.

=== Family ===
He was married to María Eugenia de Diego Alonso. The couple had two children: Alejandro and Ignacio Abellán-García de Diego.

== Publications ==
- Fernando de Castro. Memoria Testamentaria. El problema del catolicismo liberal. (1975). Madrid: Castalia.
- Miguel de Unamuno a la luz de la Psicología, Tecnos, Madrid, 1964.
- Ortega y Gasset en la filosofía española, Tecnos, Madrid, 1966.
- Filosofía española en América, 1936-1966, Seminario y Ediciones, Madrid, 1967.
- La cultura en España (Ensayos para un diagnóstico), Edicusa, Madrid, 1971.
- Mito y cultura, Seminario y Ediciones, Madrid, 1971.
- La idea de América. Origen y evolución, Istmo, Madrid, 1972.
- Sociología del 98, Península, Barcelona, 1974 (2ª edición, Biblioteca Nueva, Madrid, 1998).
- La industria cultural en España, Edicusa, Madrid, 1975.
- El erasmismo español, Gráficas El Espejo, Madrid, 1976 (2a edición, Espasa-Calpe, Madrid, 1982).
- El pensamiento español. De Séneca a Zubiri, UNED, Madrid, 1977 (en colaboración con Luis Martínez Gómez).
- El exilio español de 1939, 6 vols., Taurus, Madrid, 1976-78 (Director de la obra y colaborador de ella en los tomos I, III y VI).
- Panorama de la filosofía española actual. Una situación escandalosa, Espasa-Calpe, Madrid, 1978.
- Historias de posguerra (narraciones), Ámbito Literario, Barcelona, 1979.
- Historia crítica del Pensamiento español, 7 volúmenes, Espasa-Calpe, Madrid, 1979-1991 (Hay una edición especial de la obra en el Círculo de Lectores, Barcelona, 1992).
- De la guerra civil al exilio republicano, Mezquita, Madrid, 1982.
- París o el mundo es un palacio, Anthropos, Barcelona, 1987.
- El pensamiento español contemporáneo y la idea de América. Obra coordinada en colaboración con Antonio Monclús, 2 vols., Barcelona, 1989.
- Visión de El Escorial. (Aproximación al mito), Madrid, 1989.
- La Escuela de Madrid. Un ensayo de filosofía, Asamblea de Madrid, Madrid, 1991 (escrita en colaboración con Tomás Mallo).
- Ideas para el siglo XXI, Libertarias/Prodhufi, Madrid, 1994.
- La filosofía de "Antonio Machado", Pre-textos, Valencia, 1995.
- Historia del pensamiento español, Espasa-Calpe, Madrid, 1996.
- George Santayana (1863-1952), Ediciones del Orto, Madrid, 1996.
- El exilio filosófico en América. Los transterrados del 39, F. C.E., México, 1998.
- El 98: cien años después, Aldebarán, Madrid, 2000.
- Ortega y Gasset y los orígenes de la transición democrática, Espasa-Calpe, Madrid, 2000.
- El exilio como constante y como categoría, Biblioteca Nueva, Madrid, 2001.
- José Gaos. Introducción y antología, Ediciones Cultura Hispánica, Madrid, 2001.
- El “problema de España” y la cuestión militar, Edit. Dickinson, Madrid, 2003.
- El Ateneo de Madrid. Historia, Política, Cultura, Teosofía. Ediciones La Librería, Madrid 2006.
- María Zambrano. Una pensadora de nuestro tiempo. Edit. Anthropos. Barcelona 2006.
- El Escorial. Iconos, imágenes, mito. Ediciones 98. Madrid 2009.
- El misterio. Editorial Dalya, Cádiz, 2015.
