= Historical forgery =

Historical forgery may refer to:

- Archaeological forgery, the creation of false artifacts
- Literary forgery, in the context of the creation of false or misattributed historical texts
- Pious forgery, either of the above in ecclesiastical contexts

== See also ==
- Relic
