= Calanda, Spain =

Calanda
- municipality
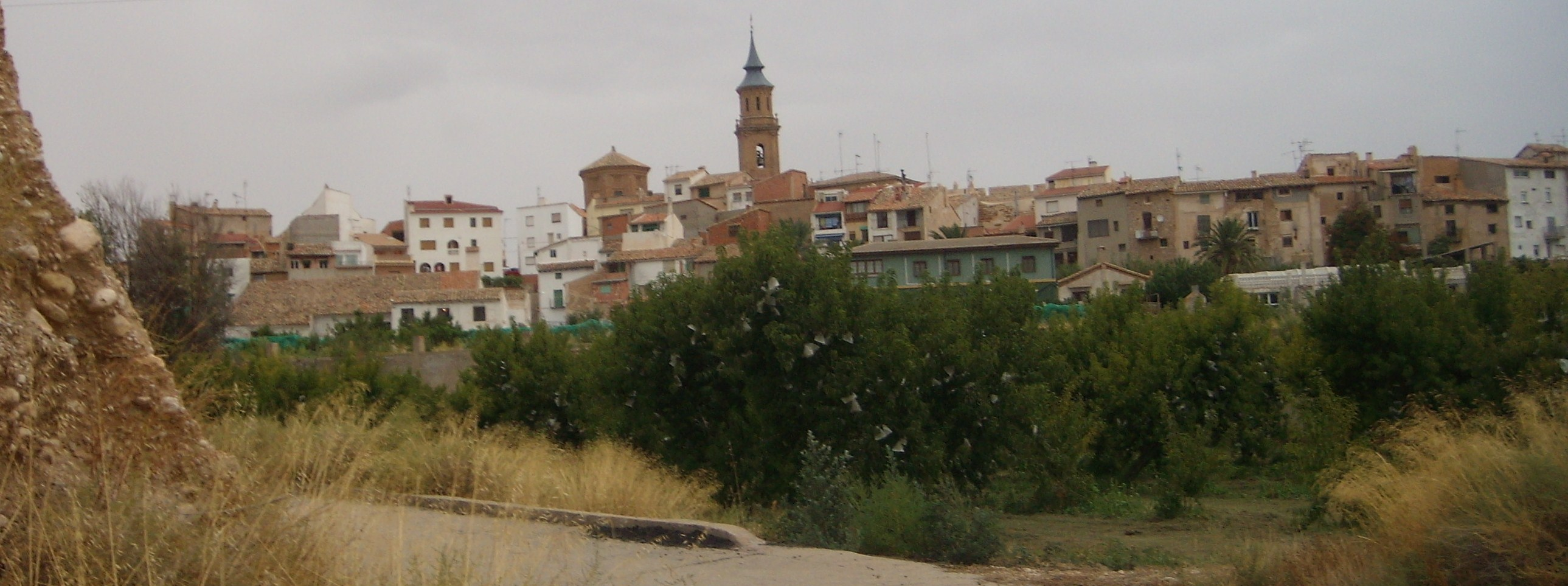

- Coat of arms

- Location in Aragon Location in Spain
- Coordinates: 40°56′27″N 0°13′54″W
- Country: Spain
- Autonomous community: Aragon
- Province: Teruel
- Comarca: Bajo Aragón

Government
  - Mayor: José Ramón Ibáñez Blasco (PSOE de Aragón) (2015–2019)

Area
  - Total: 112.25 km^{2} (43.34 sq mi)

Population (2025-01-01)
  - Total: 3,745
  - Density: 33.36/km^{2} (86.41/sq mi)
- Demonym: Calandino
- Time zone: UTC+1 (CET)
  - Summer (DST): UTC+2 (CEST)

Calanda is a town in the province of Teruel, Aragon, Spain. It lies on the southern fringe of the Ebro river basin, at the confluence of the Rivers Guadalope and Guadalopillo.

The local economy is based upon agriculture, especially the cultivation of peaches and olives, both of which have Protected Designation of Origin status: Melocotón de Calanda in the case of the peach production and Aceite del Bajo Aragón for the olive oil. Other agricultural products are almonds and other fruits as well as some cereals.

== Historic structures ==
- Acueducto de Los Arcos
- Ermita del Humilladero (16th century)
- Templo del Pilar (17th century)
- Iglesia de Nuestra Señora de la Esperanza (17th century)
- Convento del Desierto (17th century)
- Casa Fortón-Cascajares (18th century)
- Casa Buñuel (20th century)

== Demographics ==
Demographic evolution of Calanda between 1716 and 2007
2007	2004	2001	1996	1991	1908	1901	1824	1771	1716
3897	3598	3474	3596	3552	4408	3876	2456	2160	1258

== Geography ==
Located in the Lower Aragon region, it is 128 km from the provincial capital. The relief of the municipality is formed by the foothills of the Iberian System, to which belong the Mountain range of Peñas Blancas (669 m) and the Ginebrosa mountain range (835 m), both located to the south and southeast and separated by the Calanda reservoir. To the north it connects with the valley of the Guadalope River, which crosses the territory receiving the waters of the Guadalopillo River. Also noteworthy is the leafy pine forest of the Calanda Desert, located to the northwest of the town. The altitude ranges between 835 m (Sierra de la Ginebrosa) and 380 m on the banks of the Guadalope River. The town is 466 m above sea level.

=== Climate ===
Calanda has a cold semi-arid climate on the Köppen climate classification (BSk) with cool to mild winters and hot summers. Temperatures below 0 °C (32 °F) and temperatures above 35 °C (95 °F) are common during the winter and the summer, respectively. Precipitation is generally low, being well distributed throughout the year, although there is an increase during spring. The city has higher average annual temperatures due to its lower altitude compared to other areas in the province of Teruel, which have lower temperatures due to their higher altitude.

Climate data for Calanda (1991-2020), extremes (1990-present)
Month	Jan	Feb	Mar	Apr	May	Jun	Jul	Aug	Sep	Oct	Nov	Dec	Year
Record high °C (°F)	22.5 (72.5)	23.0 (73.4)	29.9 (85.8)	31.0 (87.8)	35.9 (96.6)	43.2 (109.8)	43.0 (109.4)	41.6 (106.9)	36.9 (98.4)	33.1 (91.6)	25.3 (77.5)	22.8 (73.0)	43.2 (109.8)
Mean daily maximum °C (°F)	11.0 (51.8)	12.7 (54.9)	16.5 (61.7)	19.1 (66.4)	23.5 (74.3)	28.8 (83.8)	32.1 (89.8)	31.3 (88.3)	26.2 (79.2)	21.0 (69.8)	14.6 (58.3)	11.3 (52.3)	20.7 (69.2)
Daily mean °C (°F)	6.9 (44.4)	8.1 (46.6)	11.0 (51.8)	13.5 (56.3)	17.5 (63.5)	22.1 (71.8)	25.1 (77.2)	24.6 (76.3)	20.4 (68.7)	16.1 (61.0)	10.5 (50.9)	7.3 (45.1)	15.3 (59.5)
Mean daily minimum °C (°F)	2.8 (37.0)	3.5 (38.3)	5.5 (41.9)	7.9 (46.2)	11.4 (52.5)	15.4 (59.7)	18.0 (64.4)	17.9 (64.2)	14.7 (58.5)	11.2 (52.2)	6.3 (43.3)	3.3 (37.9)	9.8 (49.7)
Record low °C (°F)	−7.0 (19.4)	−5.0 (23.0)	−7.0 (19.4)	−1.2 (29.8)	1.3 (34.3)	4.5 (40.1)	10.5 (50.9)	7.0 (44.6)	6.0 (42.8)	1.0 (33.8)	−4.0 (24.8)	−8.0 (17.6)	−8.0 (17.6)
Average precipitation mm (inches)	26.6 (1.05)	20.7 (0.81)	25.9 (1.02)	40.5 (1.59)	56.3 (2.22)	33.7 (1.33)	28.4 (1.12)	34.9 (1.37)	39.6 (1.56)	41.3 (1.63)	33.8 (1.33)	24.8 (0.98)	406.5 (16.01)
Source: Agencia Estatal de Meteorología

== Notable natives and residents ==
- Miguel Pellicer (1617–1647)
- Gaspar Sanz (1640–1710)
- José Miguel Herrero de Tejada (1677–1725)
- Miguel Antonio Peralta (1710–1785)
- Luisa Herrero de Tejada (1711–1777)
- José Francisco Quintana (1714–?)
- Luis Herrero de Tejada (1716–1767)
- Tomás Juan Bernad y Sanz, Barón de Castiel (1727–?)
- Juan Sesé y Balaguer (1736–1801)
- Mariano Valimaña y Abella (1784–1864)
- Manuel Cascajares y Azara, Barón de Bárcabo (1814–1872)
- Gregorio Bonal y Herrero (1819–1898)
- Julián Pastor Alvira (1820–1893)
- Antonio María Cascajares y Azara (1834–1901)
- Mariano Bernad (1838–1915)
- Juan José Gasca Ballabriga (1844–1914)
- Leonardo Buñuel González (1855–1923)
- Joaquín Adán Berned (1860–1895)
- Manuel Albert (1867–1936)
- Vicente Allanegui (1868–1948)
- Eloy Crespo Gasque (1886–1936)
- Miguel Sancho Izquierdo (1890–1988)
- Luis Buñuel (1900–1983)
- Manuel Mindán Manero (1902–2006)
- Ginés Ginés Grao (1905–2003)
- José Repollés Aguilar (1914–1975)
- Lola Aguado (1922–1981)
- José Lamiel (1924–2020)
- Vicente Hostaled Ferrer (1927–1987)
- Antonio Bielsa Alegre (1929–2008)
- Miguel Portolés Mombiela (1933)
- Luis Hinojosa Galindo (1948)

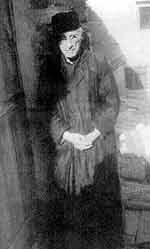
Vicente Allanegui

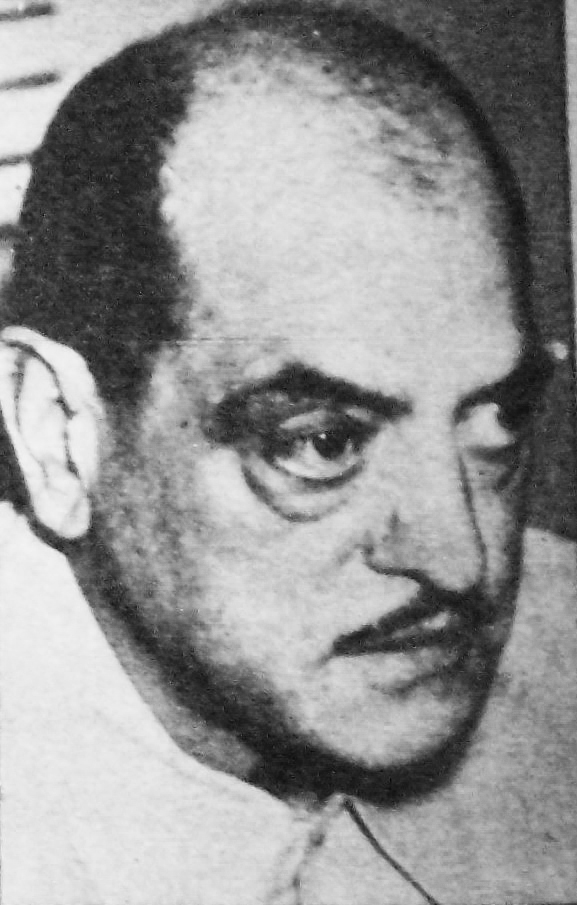
Luis Buñuel

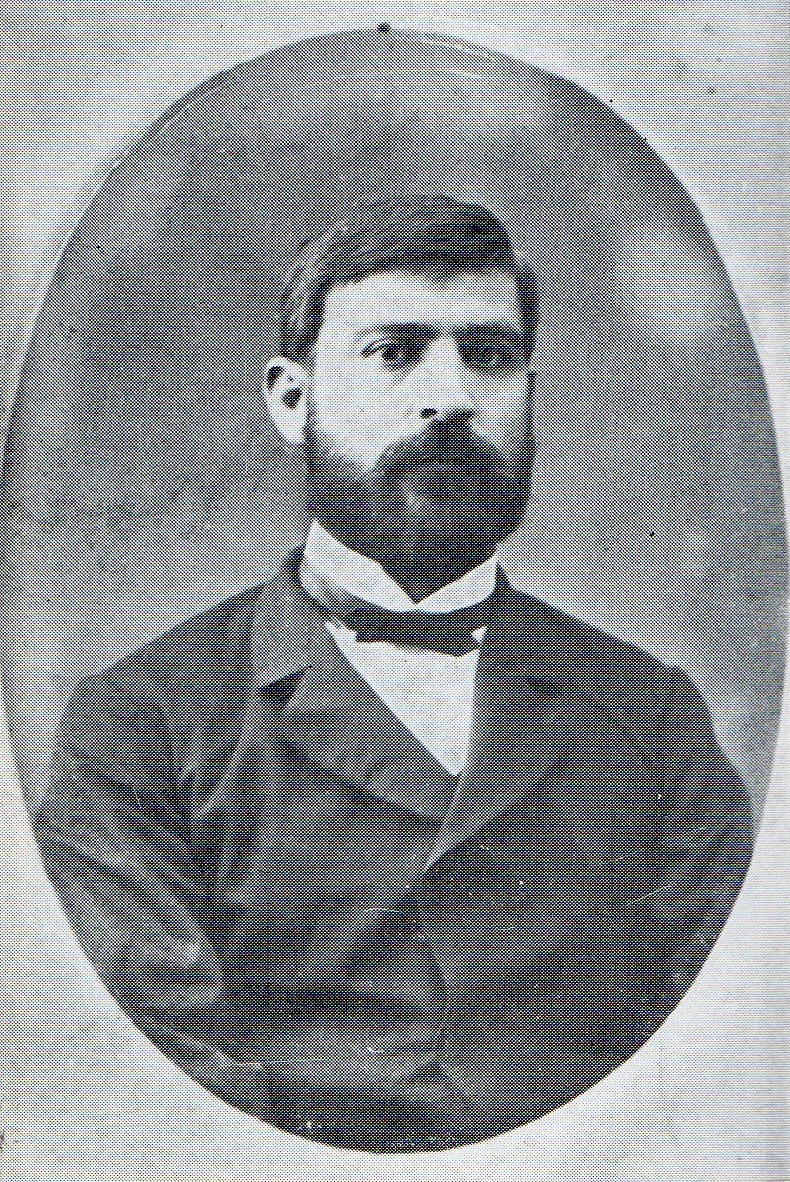
Mariano Bernad

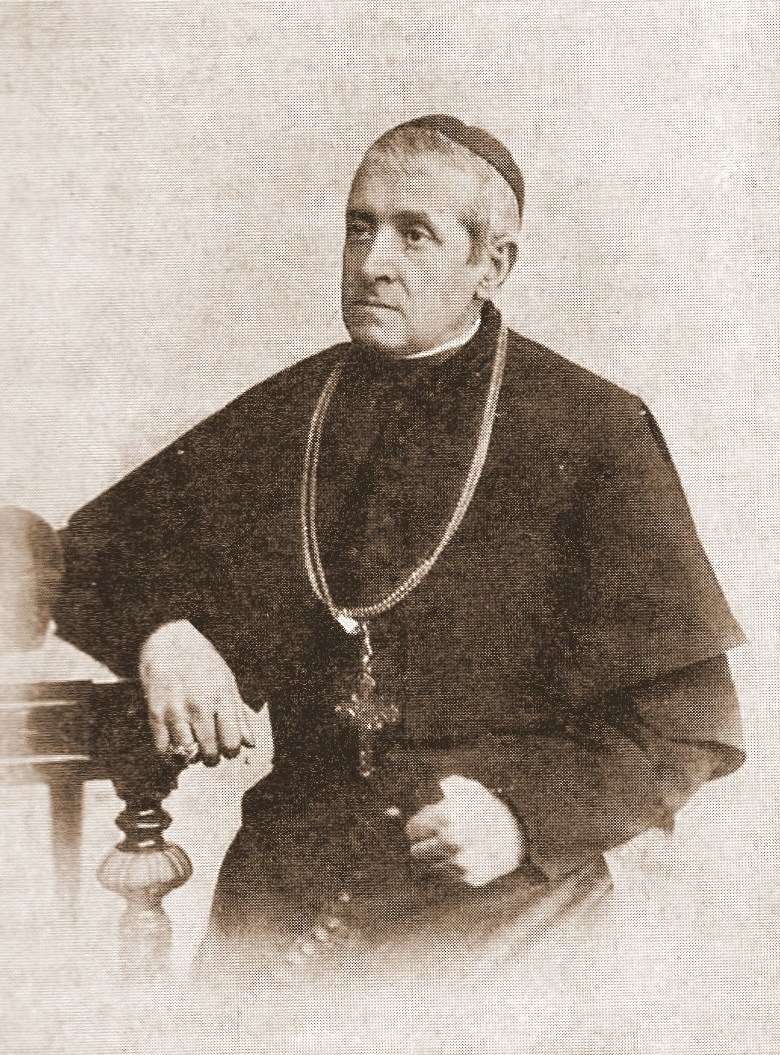
Antonio María Cascajares y Azara

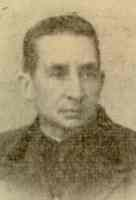
Manuel Mindán Manero

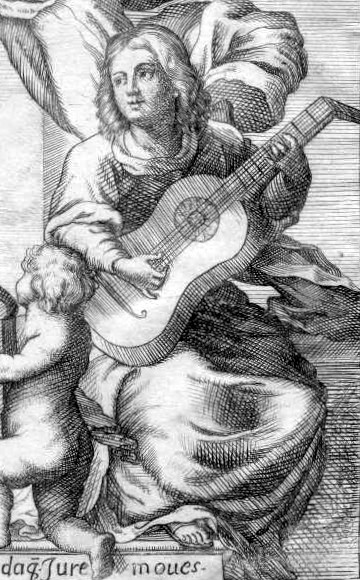
Gaspar Sanz

== See also ==
- Miracle of Calanda

== Sister cities ==
- Frouzins, France

== Bibliography ==
- Allanegui y Lusarreta, Vicente: Apuntes históricos sobre la Historia de Calanda, 1998, Zaragoza: Ayuntamiento de Calanda-Parroquia de la Esperanza de Calanda-Instituto de Estudios Turolenses.
- García Miralles, Manuel: Historia de Calanda, 1969, Valencia: Tipografía Artística Puertes.

== Filmography ==
- 1966: Calanda. France. Dir.: Juan Luis Buñuel. Black and White. 21 min.

== Gallery ==
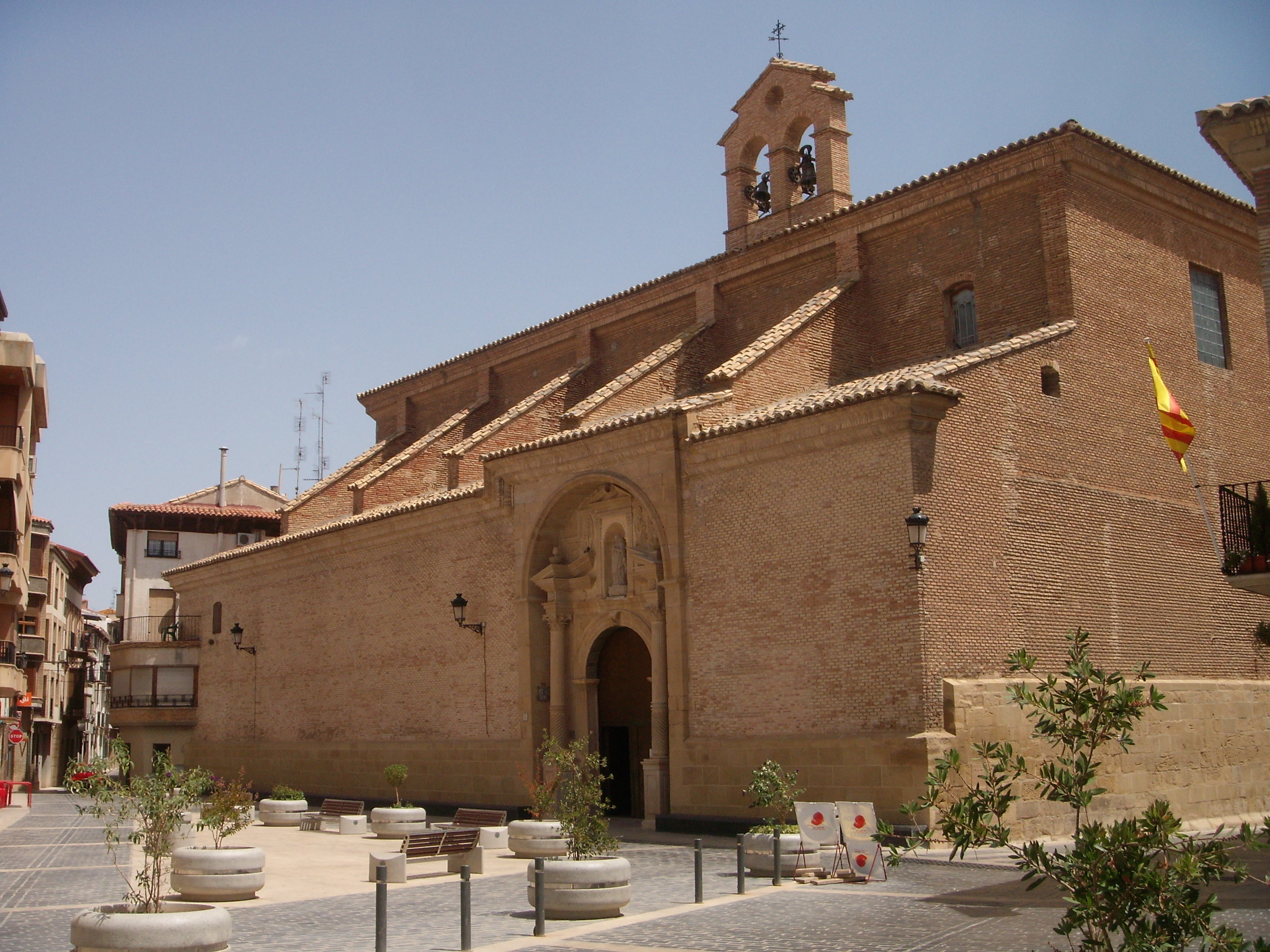
Iglesia de Nuestra Señora de la Esperanza.

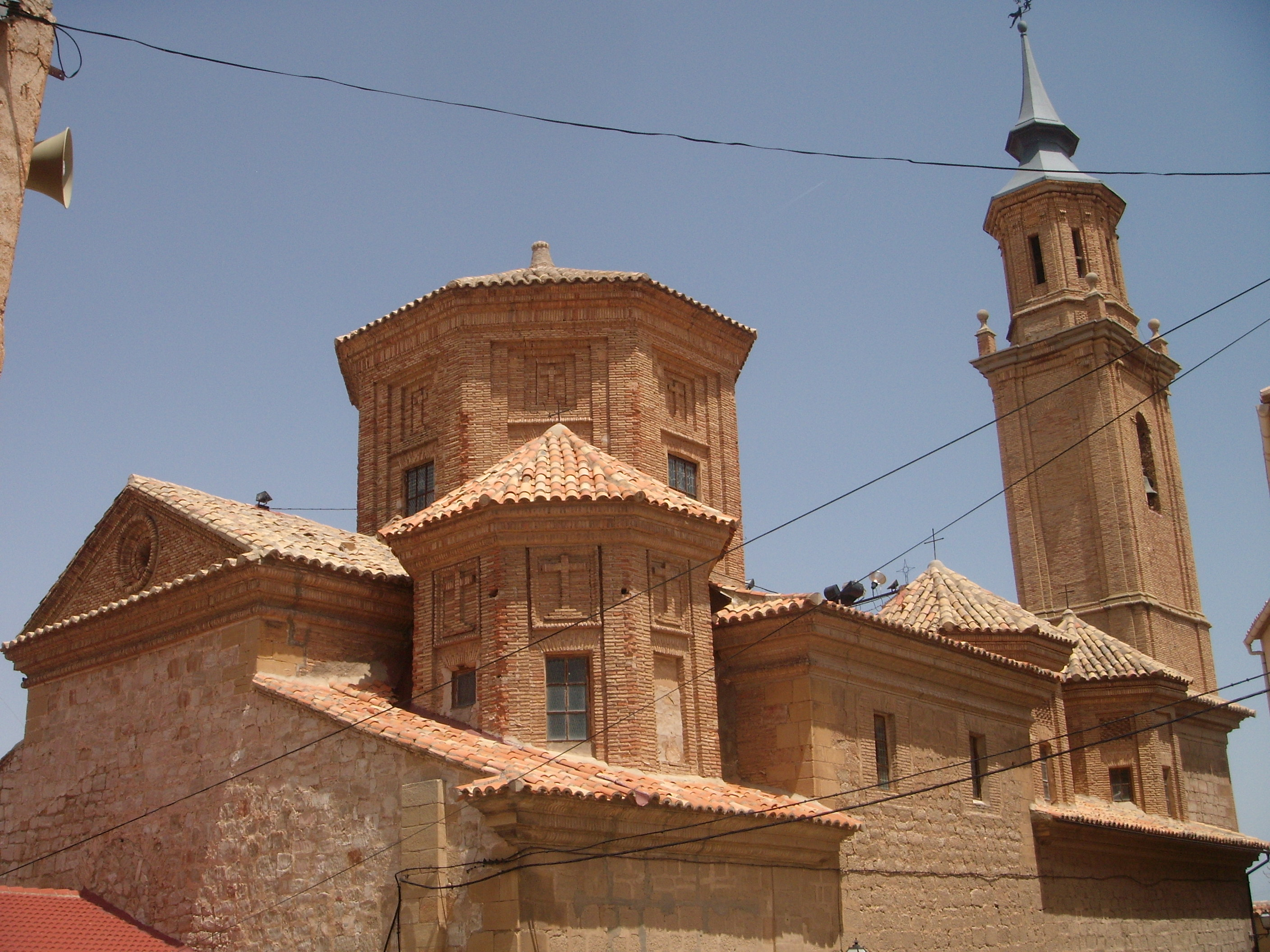
Templo del Pilar.

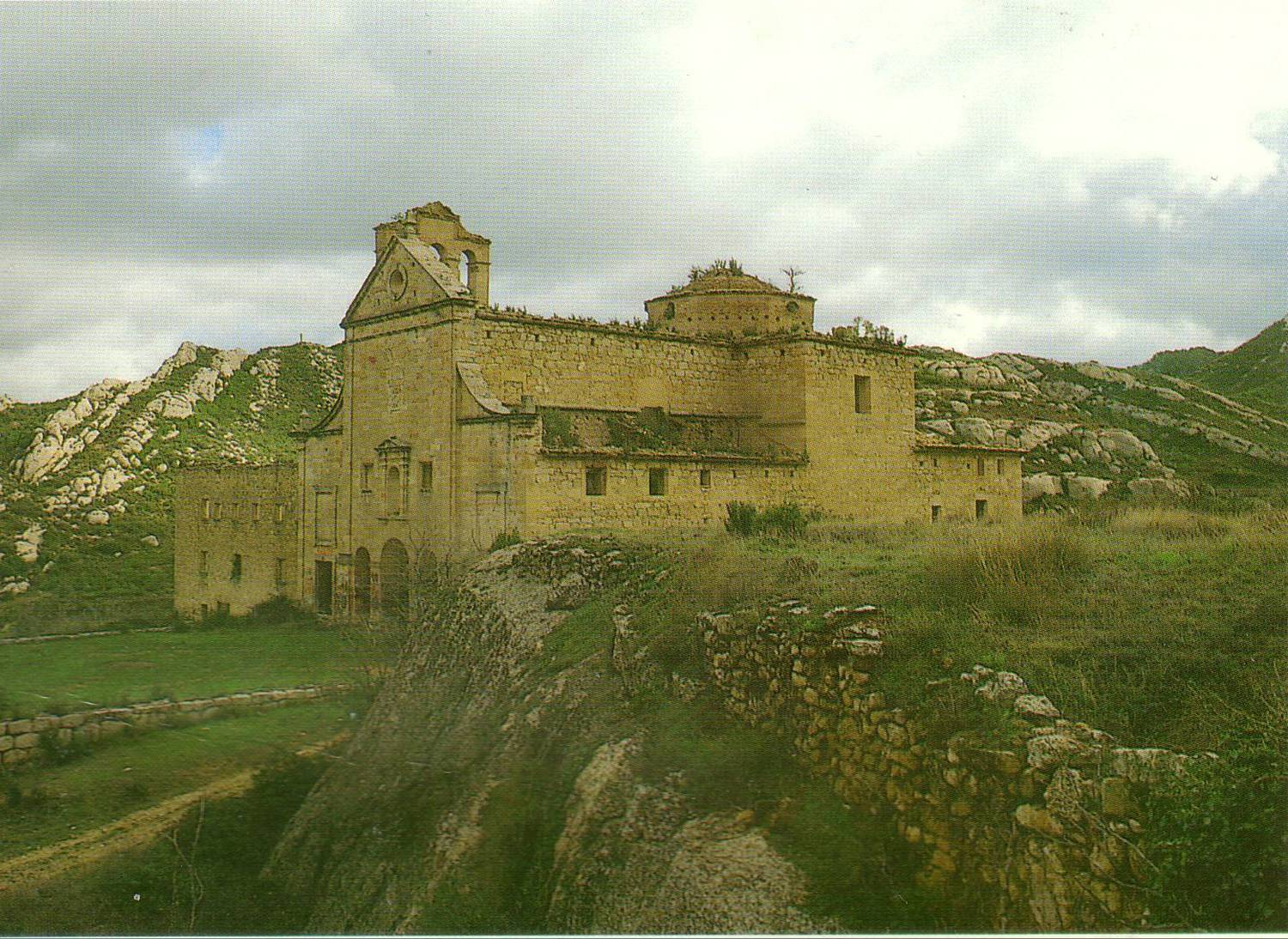
Convento del Desierto.

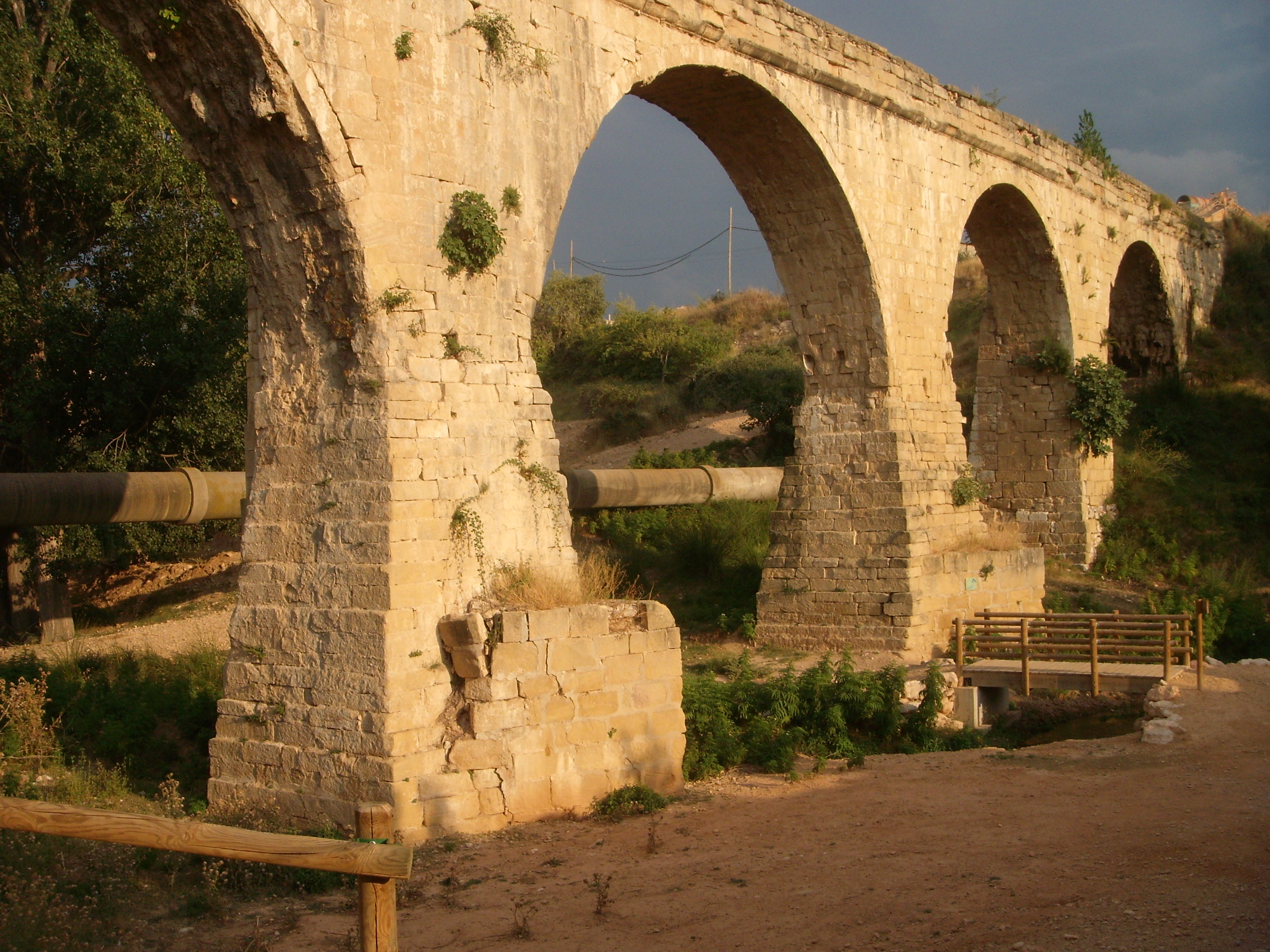
Los Arcos.

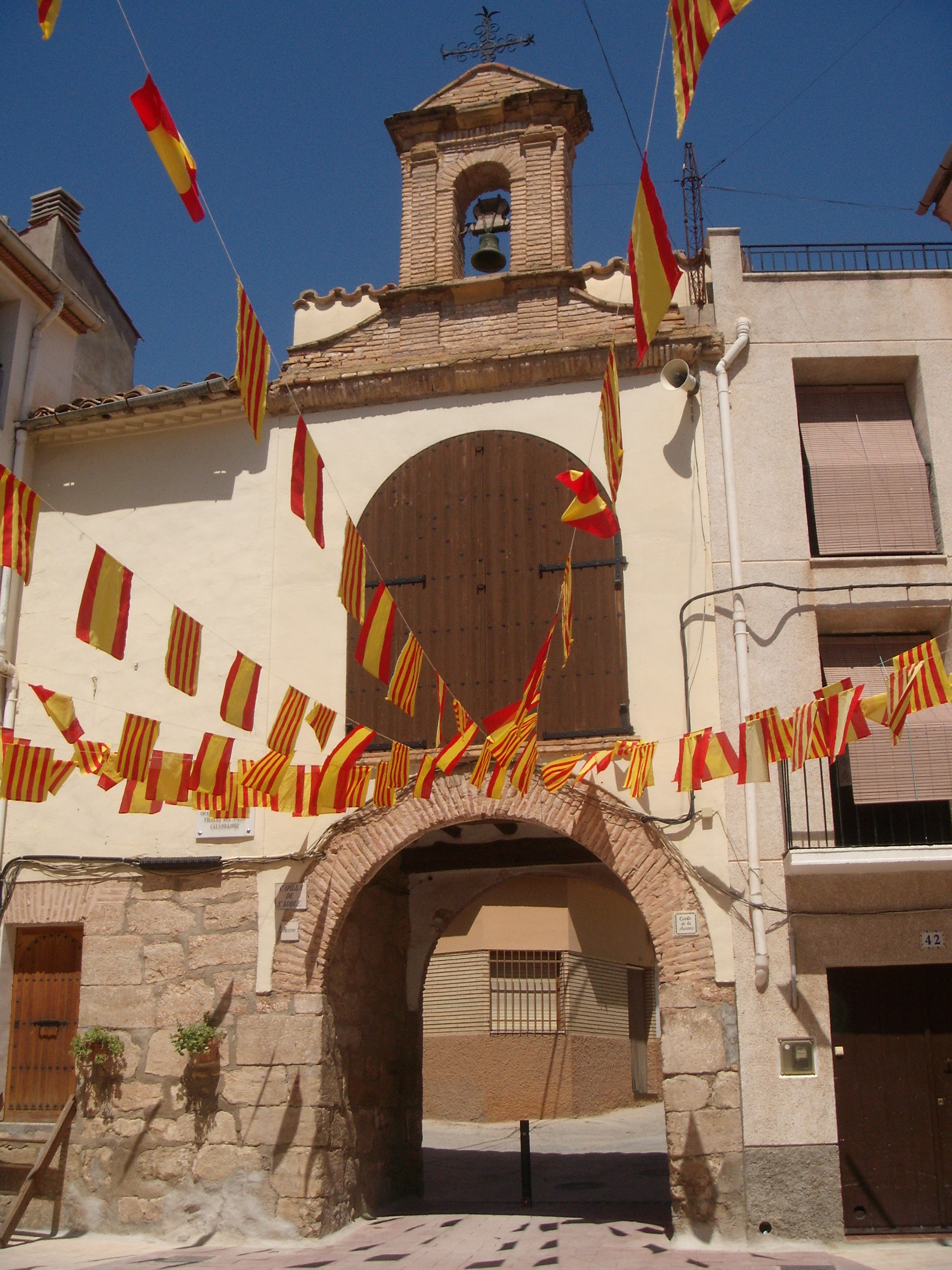
Arco de San Roque.

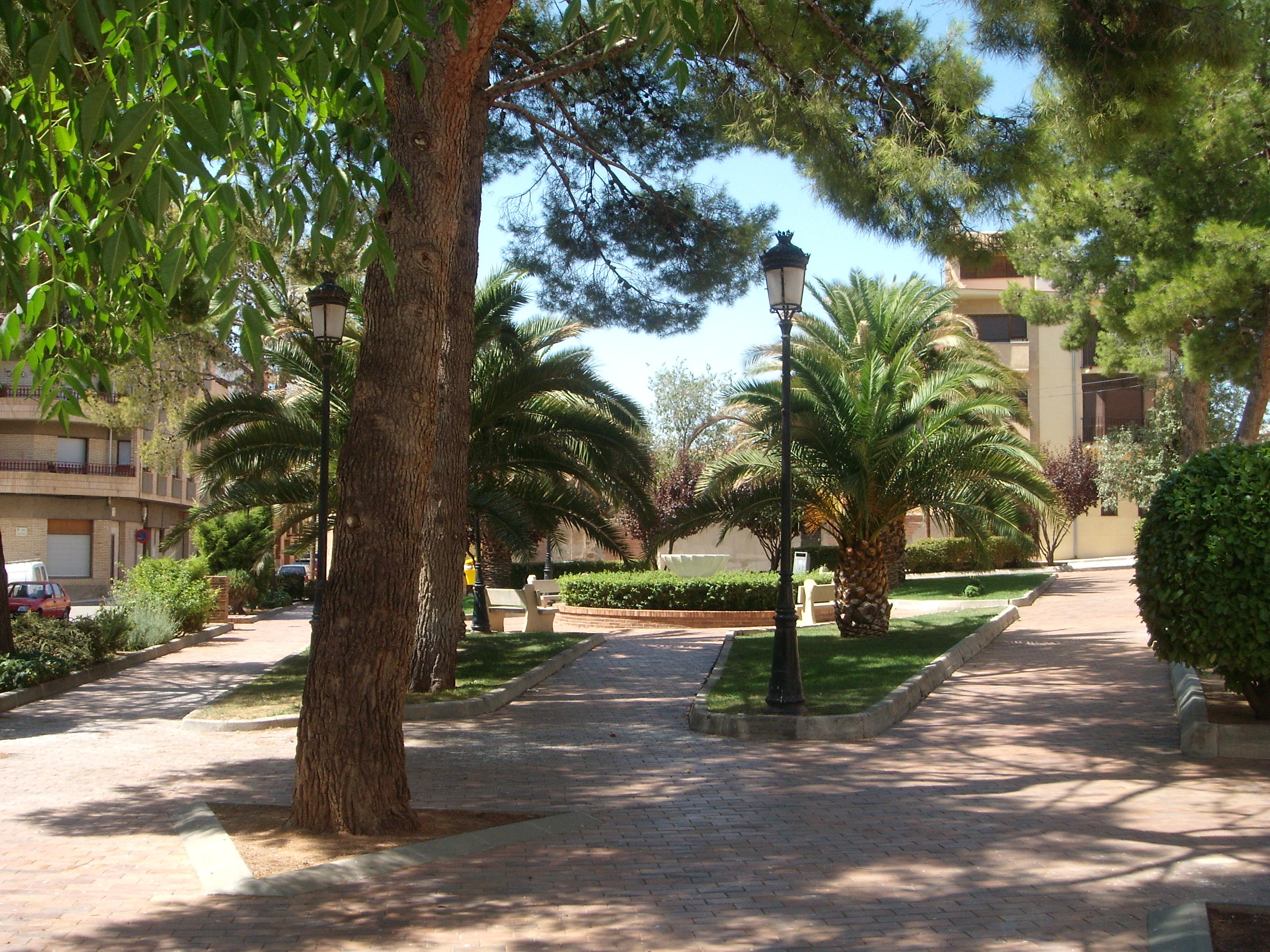
Glorieta Oliva Gasque.

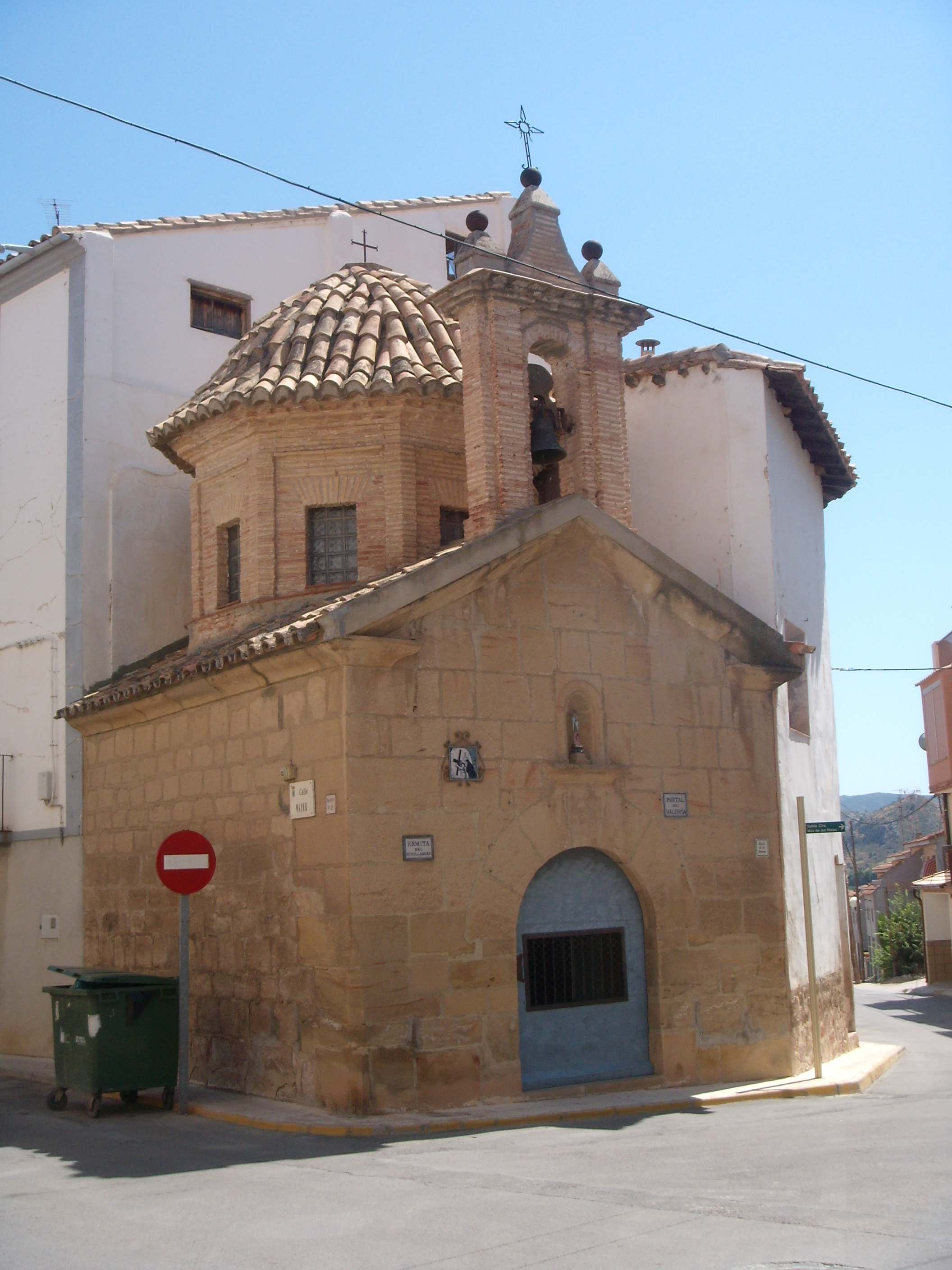
El Humilladero.

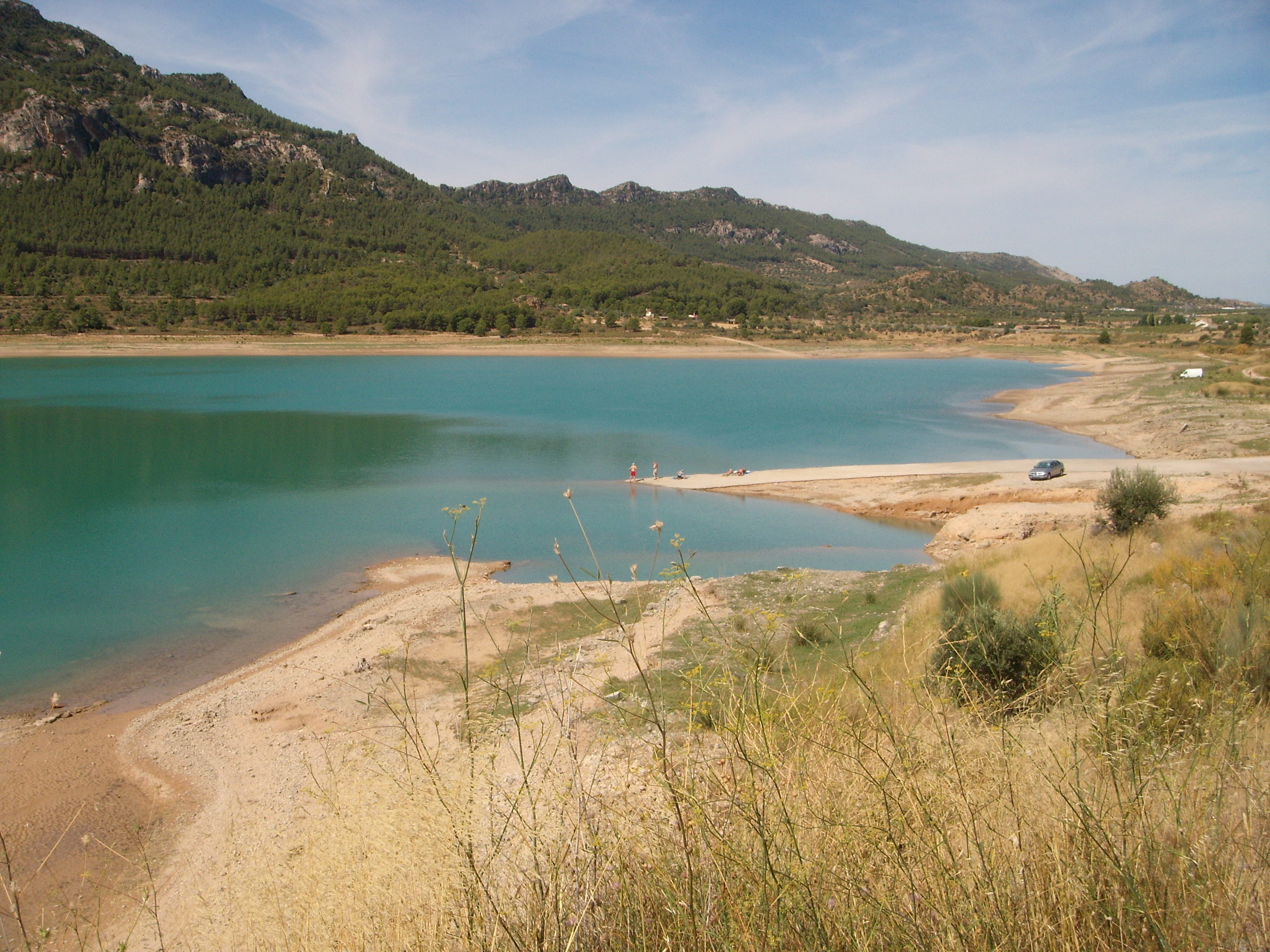
Pantano de Calanda.

=== Archaeology: Camino de la Vega de Albalate ===
- Roman villa of Camino de Albalate
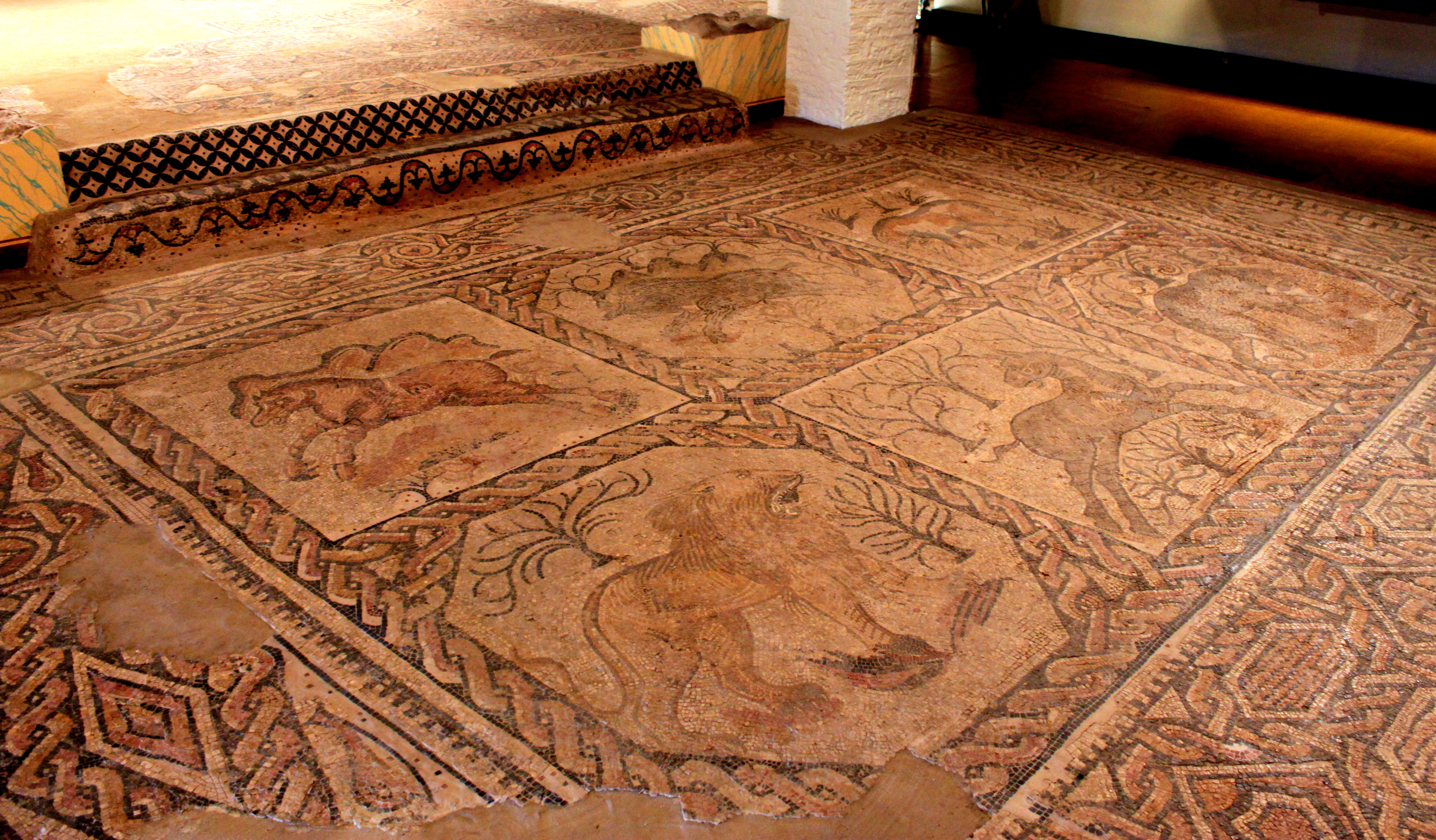
Camino de Albalate (1): Roman mosaic.

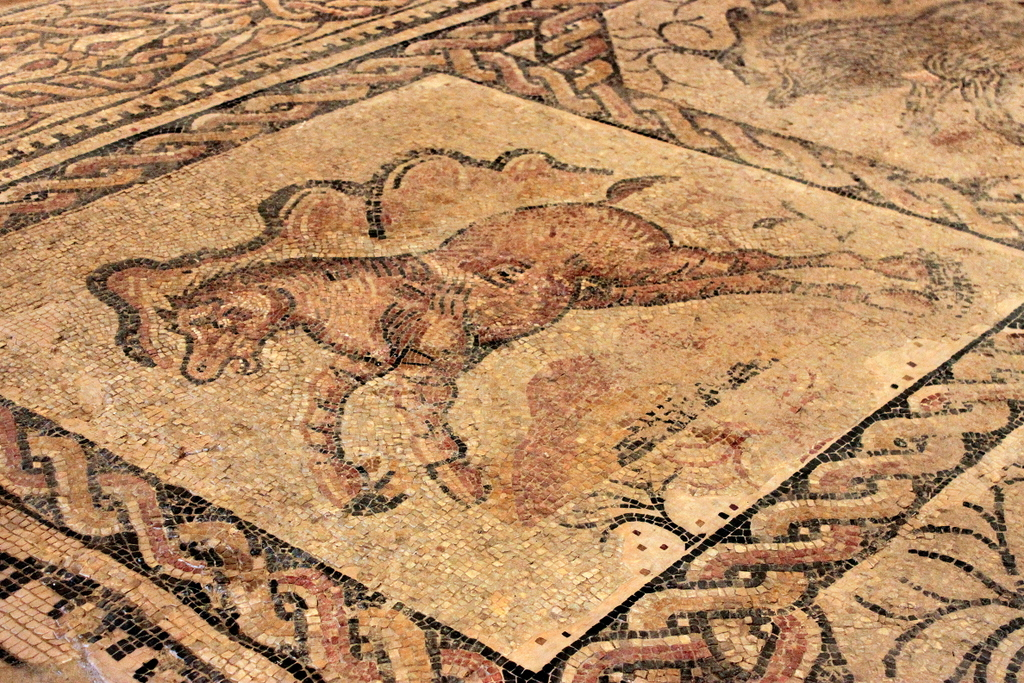
Camino de Albalate (2): Roman mosaic, detail.

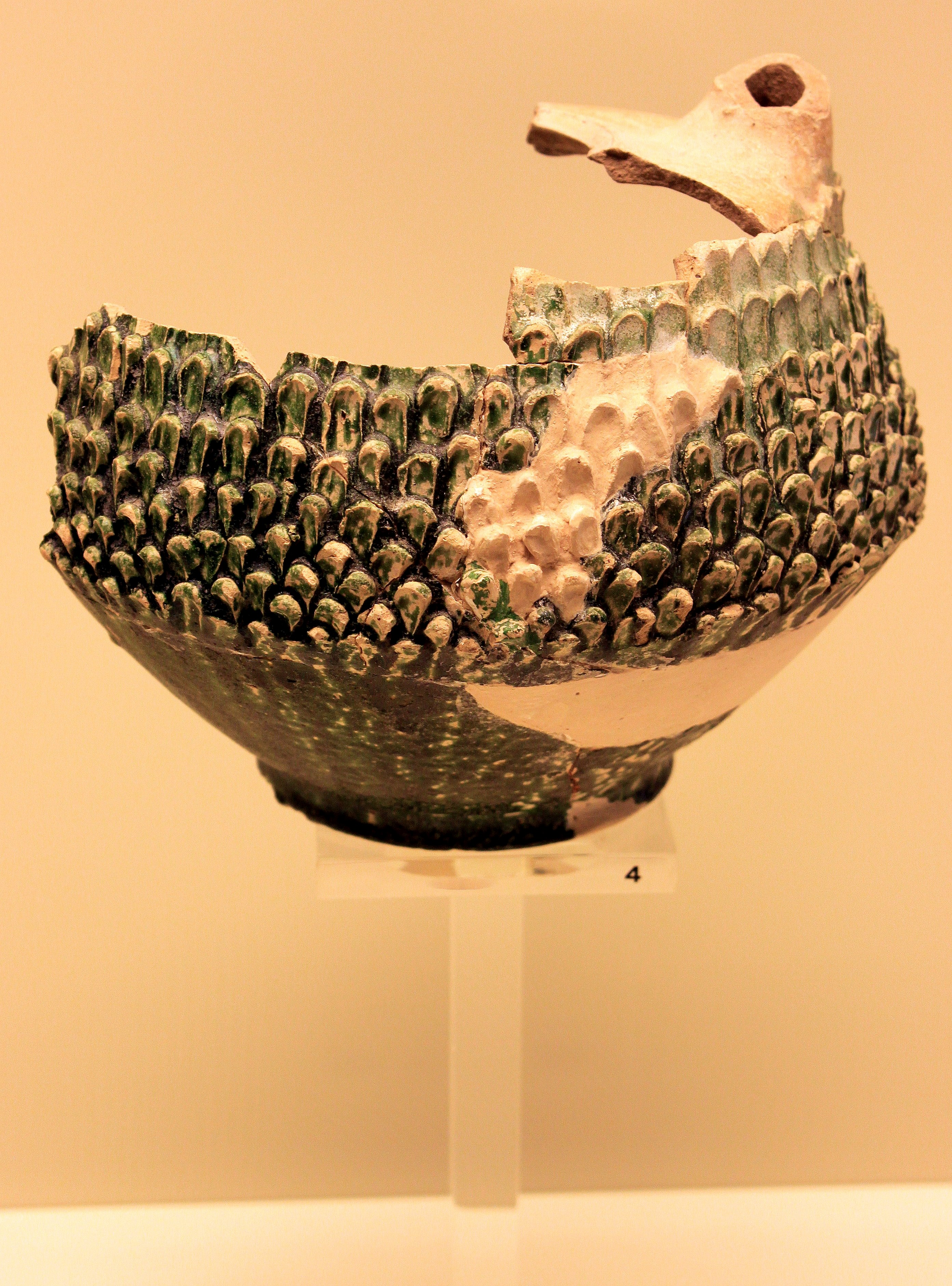
Camino de Albalate (3): Glazed ceramic vessel.

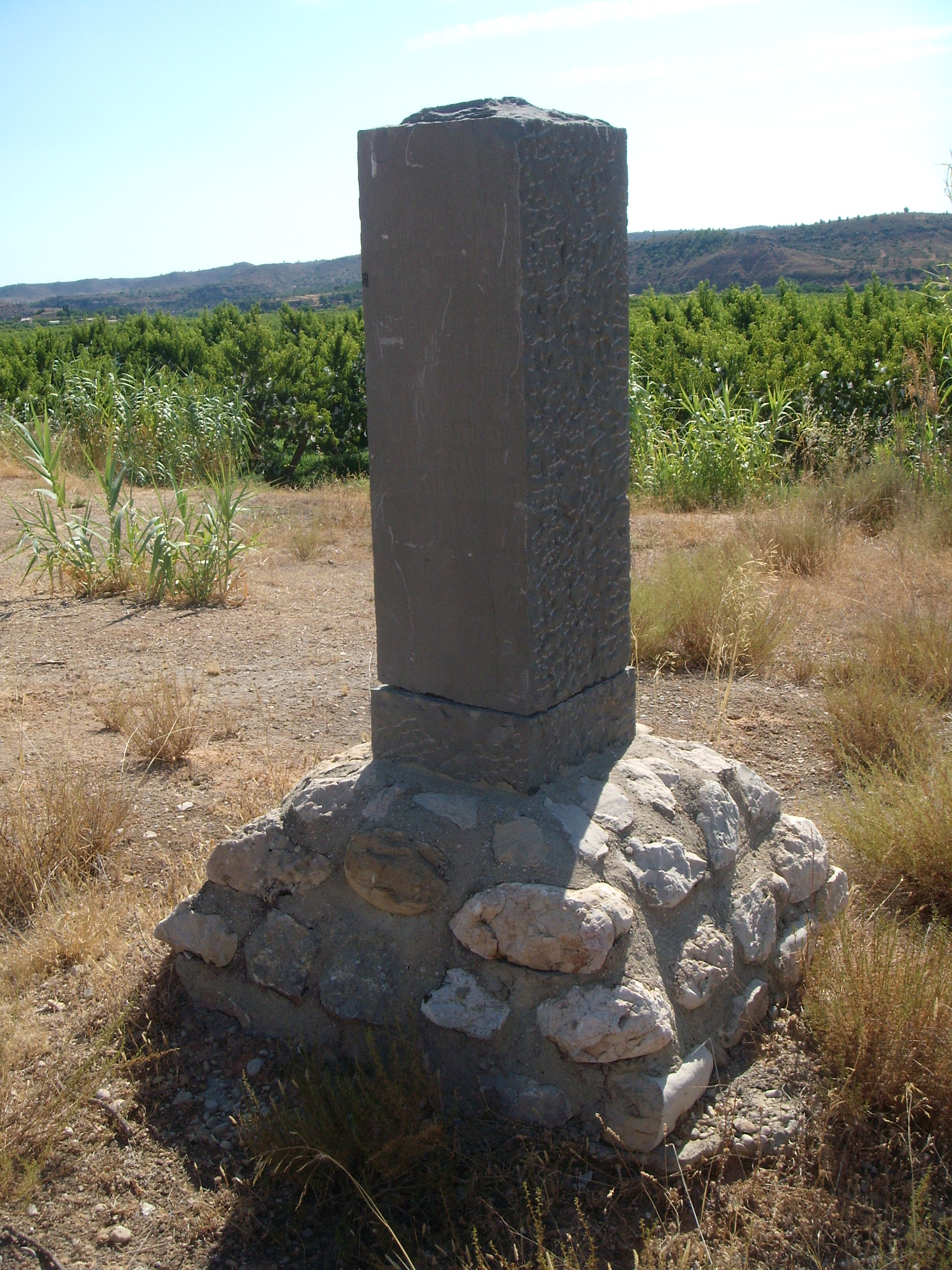
Camino de Albalate (4): Landmark memorial.

== See also ==
- List of municipalities in Teruel
