= Vicente Allanegui =

Aragonese priest and composer

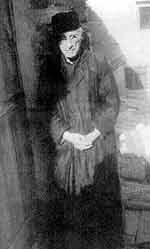
Vicente Allanegui y Lusarreta

Vicente Allanegui y Lusarreta (1868–1948) was an Aragonese priest and composer born in Calanda in the Spanish comarca of Bajo Aragón.

== Works ==
- 1926: Marcha Palillera (in Epdlp)

== Bibliography ==
- Allanegui y Lusarreta, Vicente, Apuntes históricos sobre la Historia de Calanda, Ayuntamiento de Calanda-Parroquia de la Esperanza-Instituto de Estudios Turolenses, 1998.
