= Juan Sesé y Balaguer =

Juan Sesé y Balaguer (1736–1801) was an Aragonese composer and organist born in Calanda in the Spanish comarca of Bajo Aragón. He died in Madrid in 1801.

== Some important works ==
- Seis fugas para órgano o clavicordio, Op. 1
- Colección de piezas de música para clavicordio, fortepiano y órgano, Op. 6
- Preludio, Largo e Intento

== Bibliography ==
- Allanegui y Lusarreta, Vicente, Apuntes históricos sobre la Historia de Calanda, Ayuntamiento de Calanda-Parroquia de la Esperanza-Instituto de Estudios Turolenses, 1998.
- Bielsa Arbiol, José Antonio, "Sobre Juan de Sesé, compositor calandino. Tras la pista de un ilustre desconocido", Kolenda nº 97, Febrero 2011, Calanda (Teruel), p. 14.
