= Mariano Bernad =

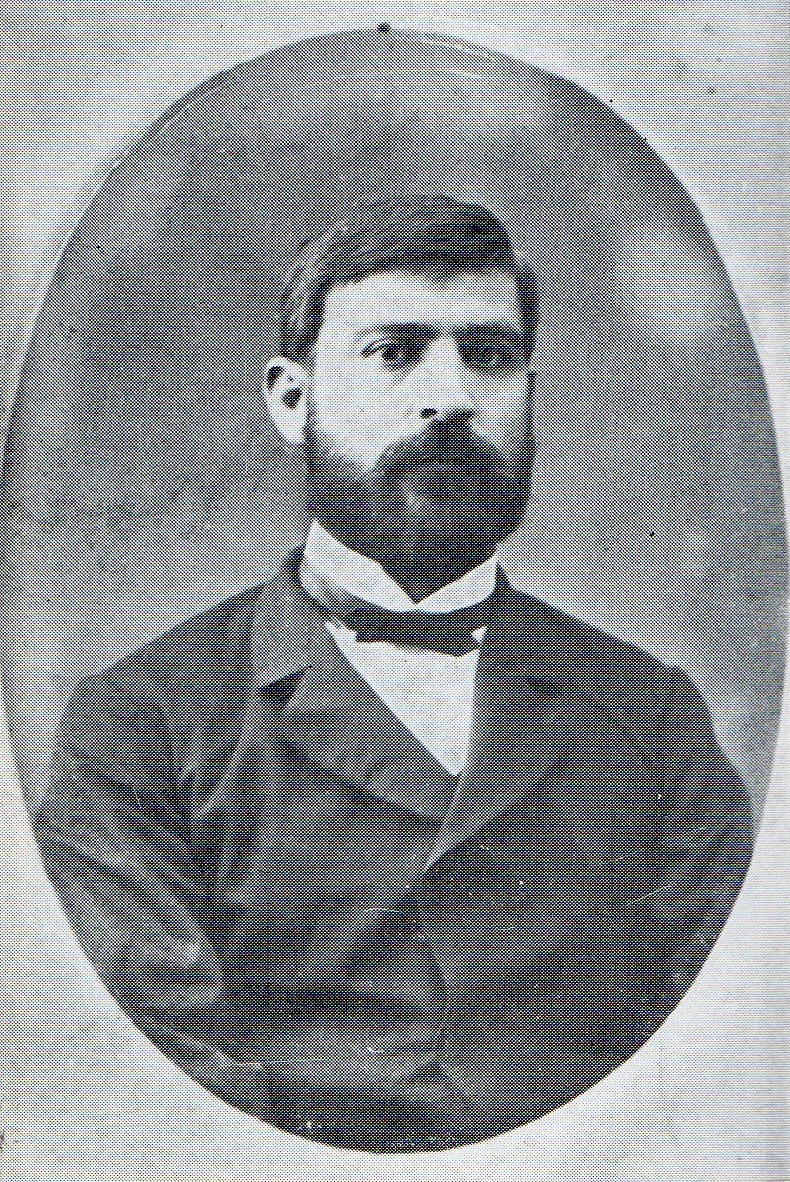
Mariano Bernad

Mariano Bernad Sanz (1838–1915) was an Aragonese priest, missionary and writer born in Calanda in the Spanish comarca of Bajo Aragón.

== Selected works ==
- Vocabulario Cuyono & Apuntes gramaticales
- Preliminares

== Bibliography ==
- García Miralles, Manuel (1969). Historia de Calanda. Valencia: Tipografía Artística Puertes.
