= Religious fraud =

Fraud done within a religion or in its name

Religious fraud is a term used for civil or criminal fraud carried out in the name of a religion or within a religion, e.g. false claims to being kosher or tax fraud.

A specific form of religious fraud is pious fraud (Latin: pia fraus), whereby one employs lies and/or deception in order to convince others of the truth of one's own religion or specific religious claims. Sometimes these involve 'white lies': the perpetrator may think it more important to make others accept a certain belief than that the method is truthful; this end justifies the means of a lie. A well-known example is the Shroud of Turin, a late Medieval fabrication that supposedly was the clothing in which Jesus would have been buried in the 1st century.

There have been many instances of religious institutions carrying out fraud throughout history. The Roman Church sold indulgences to reduce the punishment an individual would face for their sins, leaders of a Florida church were convicted of investment fraud, and more recently the largest collapse of a religious financial institution in U.S. history called the Baptist Foundation of Arizona.

Law enforcement calls this affinity fraud, which means targeting victims through a common bond, religion or ethnic communities. Though religious fraud is more specified in that it only relates to affinity fraud done through the common bond of religion and that the perpetrators motivated the people of that common bond in the name of religion. Authorities have taken multiple measures throughout history to remit this behavior. Their more current strategy relies on educating the public about the schemes used in affinity fraud cases.

== Relation to affinity fraud ==
According to the U.S. Securities and Exchange Commission, affinity frauds target members of identifiable groups, such as the elderly, religious, or ethnic communities. The common form of fraud that takes place in the name of religion is affinity fraud. As the church leaders use religion to motivate their church body to invest fraudulent schemes that benefit the leaders and make the investors eventually worse off. This means that religious fraud's relative to affinity fraud is that affinity fraud is a common tactic used to conduct religious fraud.

== Examples ==
- The Roman Catholic Church sold indulgences, the pardon of worldly punishment due to sin. After Luther's 'Ninety-five Theses' indulgences have become synonymous to corruption in the Catholic Church.
- The leaders of Greater Ministries International--Haywood Eudon Hall, Betty Payne, Gerald Payne, Patrick Talbert, and David Whitfield-- were found guilty of running a financial scheme that scammed thousands of their church goers out of millions of dollars. The scale of the operation is displayed by the $448 million in the Greater Ministries' financial plans.
- The Baptist Foundation of Arizona faces investment fraud, authorities estimate that some 13,000 investors purchased over $500 million worth of securities from the BFA. According to the Clergy journal one of the top ten scams that are promoted to church members is unlicensed individuals selling securities.

== Conditions for fraud ==
One reason that church fraud takes place comes from their accounting practices being inadequate. For example, allowing a single individual, or a small group of individuals with aligned interests to have complete control over the church's bank account can lead to temptation and theft.

Dr. Donald Cressey's fraud triangle is a representation of that factors that are take place which induces an individual to commit fraud. The first thing is that the individual has to be incentivized, such as materialistic desires, or an inability to repay debt. The next corner for an individual to partake in fraud is their perceived risk of doing so, which is dubbed opportunity. This matches with the pattern where one person is in charge of counting the money--there is less perceived risk-- they are more likely to commit fraud. The third part of the triangle is rationalization, once the other two parts have been satisfying, the perpetrator of fraud must rationalize what they are doing is the right thing.

== Authority action ==
One method of action that authorities are taking to try and stop religious fraud from taking place is by giving religious communities the necessary information to avoid crossing paths with fraud. For example, "On September 1st, 1999 State securities regulators issued a warning about con artists that were targeting religious communities." Additionally, the Office of Investor Education and Advocacy created a document that detailed how to avoid affinity fraud, which in part teaches how to limit religious fraud by giving crucial information to investors.
