= Miracle =

Event not explicable by natural or scientific laws

A miracle is an event that cannot be explained by natural or scientific laws and accordingly gets attributed to some supernatural or preternatural cause. Various religions often attribute a phenomenon characterized as miraculous to the actions of a supernatural being, especially by a deity, a miracle worker, a saint, or a religious leader.

Informally, English-speakers often use the word miracle to characterise any beneficial event that is statistically unlikely but not contrary to the laws of nature, such as surviving a natural disaster, or simply a "wonderful" occurrence, regardless of likelihood (e.g. "the miracle of childbirth"). Some coincidences may be seen as miracles.

A true miracle would, by definition, be a non-natural phenomenon, leading many writers to dismiss miracles as physically impossible (that is, requiring violation of established laws of physics within their domain of validity) or impossible to confirm by their nature (because all possible physical mechanisms can never be ruled out). The former position is expressed (for instance) by Thomas Jefferson, and the latter by David Hume. Theologians typically say that, with divine providence, God regularly works through nature yet, as a creator, may work without, above, or against it as well.

== Definitions ==
The word miracle is usually used to describe any beneficial event considered physically impossible or otherwise inexplicable by natural means. Theologically, however, there are more specific definitions. Wayne Grudem defines a miracle as "a less common kind of God's activity in which he arouses people's awe and wonder and bears witness to himself". A deistic perspective of God's relation to the world defines a miracle as a direct intervention of God into the world.

== Naturalistic explanations ==
A miracle may be false information or simply a fictional story, rather than something that truly happened. A miracle experience may be due to cognitive errors (e.g. overthinking, jumping to conclusions) or psychological errors (e.g. hallucinations) of witnesses. Use of some drugs such as psychedelics (e.g. ecstasy) may produce similar effects to religious experiences.

=== Law of truly large numbers ===
Statistically improbable events are sometimes called miracles. For instance, when three classmates coincidentally meet in a different country decades after having left school, they may consider this miraculous. However, a colossal number of events happen every moment on Earth; thus, extremely unlikely coincidences also happen every moment. Events considered impossible are therefore not so – they are just increasingly rare and dependent on the number of individual events. British mathematician J. E. Littlewood suggested that individuals should statistically expect one-in-a-million events to happen to them at the rate of about one per month. By his definition, seemingly miraculous events are actually commonplace.

== Supernatural explanations ==
A miracle is a phenomenon claimed to be unexplained by known laws of nature. The criteria for classifying an event as a miracle vary. Often a religious text, such as the Bible or Quran, states that a miracle occurred, and believers may accept this as fact.

=== Philosophical explanations ===
==== Aristotelian and Neo-Aristotelian ====
The Aristotelian view of God has God as pure actuality and considers him as the prime mover doing only what a perfect being can do, think. Jewish neo-Aristotelian philosophers who are still influential today include Maimonides, Samuel ben Judah ibn Tibbon, and Gersonides. Directly or indirectly, their views are still prevalent in much of the religious Jewish community.

==== Baruch Spinoza ====
In his Tractatus Theologico-Politicus, the philosopher Spinoza claims that miracles are merely lawlike events of whose causes we are ignorant. We should not treat them as having no cause or as having a cause immediately available. Rather the miracle is for combating the ignorance it entails, like a political project.

==== David Hume ====
According to the philosopher David Hume, a miracle is "a transgression of a law of nature by a particular volition of the Deity, or by the interposition of some invisible agent". From this premise, the crux of his argument is this: "No testimony is sufficient to establish a miracle, unless the testimony be of such a kind, that its falsehood would be more miraculous, than the fact which it endeavours to establish." By Hume's definition, a miracle directly contradicts our regular experience of how the universe works. As miracles are single events, the evidence for them is always limited and we experience them rarely. On the basis of experience and evidence, the probability that miracle occurred is always less than the probability that it did not occur. As it is rational to believe what is more probable, we are not supposed to have a good reason to believe that a miracle occurred.

==== Friedrich Schleiermacher ====
According to the Christian theologian Friedrich Schleiermacher "every event, even the most natural and usual, becomes a miracle as soon as the religious view of it can be the dominant".

==== Søren Kierkegaard ====
The philosopher Søren Kierkegaard, following Hume and Johann Georg Hamann, a Humean scholar, agrees with Hume's definition of a miracle as a transgression of a law of nature, but Kierkegaard, writing as his pseudonym Johannes Climacus, regards any historical reports to be less than certain, including historical reports of miracles, as all historical knowledge is always doubtful and open to approximation.

==== James Keller ====
James Keller states that the "claim that God has worked a miracle implies that God has singled out certain persons for some benefit which many others do not receive implies that God is unfair".

==== Richard Swinburne ====
Philosopher Richard Swinburne has applied Bayesian methods to assess whether historical testimony can raise the probability of a miracle, such as the resurrection of Jesus, above that of naturalistic alternatives.

== Religious views ==
According to a 2011 poll by the Pew Research Center, more than 90 percent of evangelical Christians believe miracles still take place. While Christians see God as sometimes intervening in human activities, Muslims see Allah as a direct cause of all events. "God's overwhelming closeness makes it easy for Muslims to admit the miraculous in the world."

=== Buddhism ===
The Haedong Kosung-jon of Korea (Biographies of High Monks) records that King Beopheung of Silla had desired to promulgate Buddhism as the state religion. However, officials in his court opposed him. In the fourteenth year of his reign, Beopheung's "Grand Secretary", Ichadon, devised a strategy to overcome court opposition. Ichadon schemed with the king, convincing him to make a proclamation granting Buddhism official state sanction using the royal seal. Ichadon told the king to deny having made such a proclamation when the opposing officials received it and demanded an explanation. Instead, Ichadon would confess and accept the punishment of execution, for what would quickly be seen as a forgery. Ichadon prophesied to the king that at his execution a wonderful miracle would convince the opposing court faction of Buddhism's power. Ichadon's scheme went as planned, and the opposing officials took the bait. According to legend when Ichadon was executed on the 15th day of the 9th month in 527, his prophecy was fulfilled; the earth shook, the sun was darkened, beautiful flowers rained from the sky, his severed head flew to the sacred Geumgang mountains, and milk instead of blood sprayed 100 feet in the air from his beheaded corpse. The omen was accepted by the opposing court officials as a manifestation of heaven's approval, and Buddhism was made the state religion in 527 CE.

The Honchō Hokke Reigenki (c. 1040) of Japan contains a collection of Buddhist miracle stories.

Miracles play an important role in the veneration of Buddhist relics in Southern Asia. Thus, Somawathie Stupa in Sri Lanka is an increasingly popular site of pilgrimage and tourist destination thanks to multiple reports about miraculous rays of light, apparitions and modern legends, which often have been fixed in photographs and movies.

=== Christianity ===
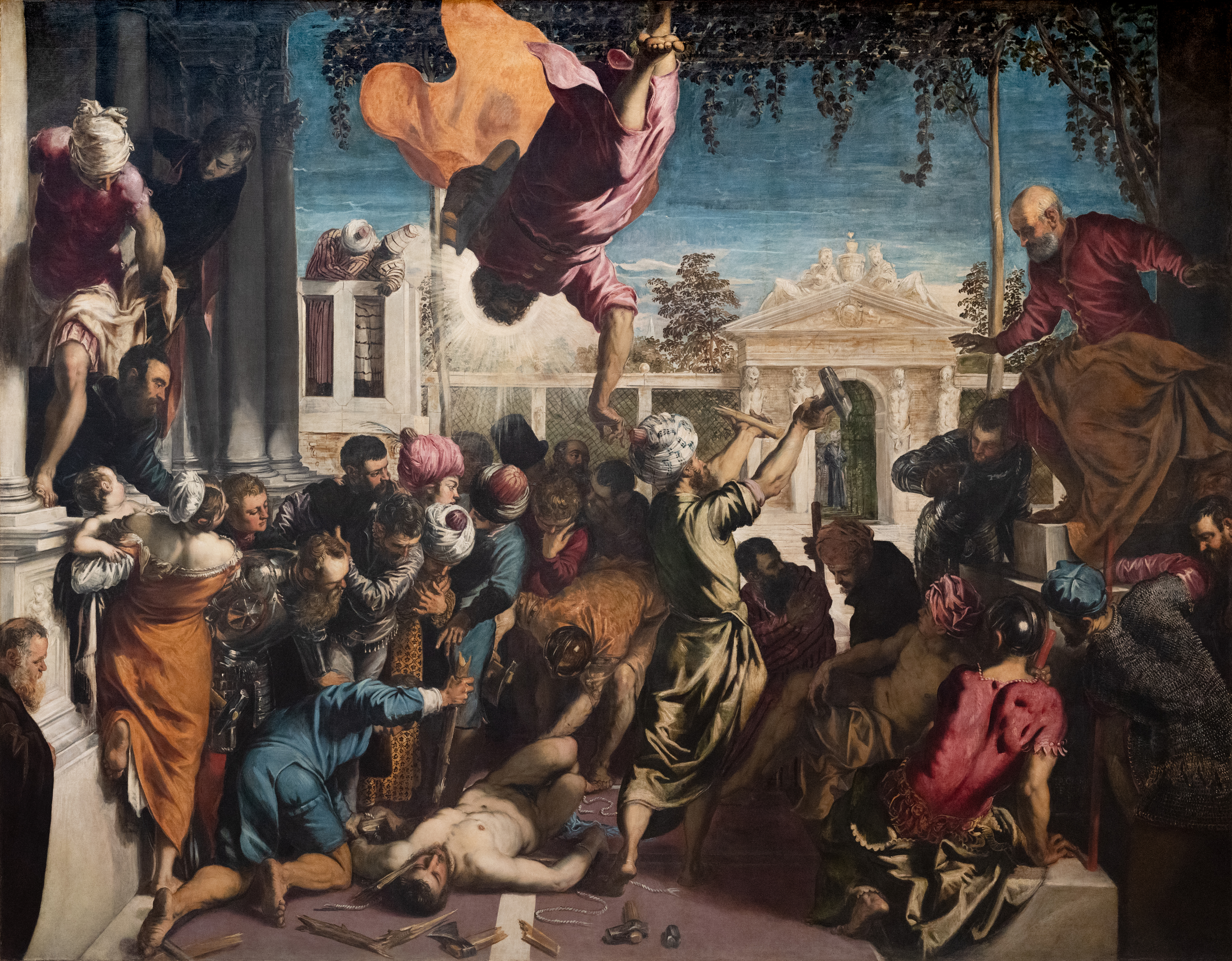
The Miracle of the Slave, a 1548 painting by Tintoretto, from the Gallerie dell'Accademia in Venice. It portrays an episode of the life of Saint Mark, patron saint of Venice, taken from Jacobus de Voragine's Golden Legend. The scene shows a saint intervening to make a slave who is about to be martyred invulnerable.

The gospels record three sorts of miracles performed by Jesus: exorcisms, cures, and natural wonders. In the Gospel of John, the miracles are referred to as "signs" and the emphasis is on God demonstrating his underlying normal activity in remarkable ways. In the New Testament, the greatest miracle is the resurrection of Jesus, the event central to Christian faith.

Jesus explains in the New Testament that miracles are performed by faith in God. "If you have faith as small as a mustard seed, you can say to this mountain, 'move from here to there' and it will move." (Gospel of Matthew 17:20). A fter Jesus returned to heaven, the Book of Acts records the disciples of Jesus praying to God to grant that miracles be done in his name for the purpose of convincing onlookers that he is alive. (Acts 4:29–31).

Other passages mention false prophets who will be able to perform miracles to deceive "if possible, even the elect of Christ" (Matthew 24:24). 2 Thessalonians 2:9 says, "And then shall that Wicked be revealed, whom the Lord shall consume with the spirit of His mouth, and shall destroy with the brightness of His coming: Even him, whose coming is after the working of Satan with all power and signs and lying wonders, and with all deceivableness of unrighteousness in them that perish; because they received not the love of the Truth, that they might be saved." Revelation 13:13,14 says, "And he doeth great wonders, so that he maketh fire come down from heaven on the earth in the sight of men, and deceiveth them that dwell on the earth by the means of those miracles which he had power to do in the sight of the beast; saying to them that dwell on the earth, that they should make an image to the beast, which had the wound by a sword, and did live." Revelation 16:14 says, "For they are the spirits of devils, working miracles, which go forth unto the kings of the earth and of the whole world, to gather them to the battle of that great day of God Almighty." Revelation 19:20 says, "And the beast was taken, and with him the false prophet that wrought miracles before him, with which he deceived them that had received the mark of the beast, and them that worshipped his image. These both were cast alive into a lake of fire burning with brimstone." These passages indicate that signs, wonders, and miracles are not necessarily committed by God. These miracles not committed by God are labeled as false(pseudo) miracles though which could mean that they are deceptive in nature and are not the same as the true miracles committed by God.

In early Christianity, miracles were the most often attested motivations for conversions of pagans; pagan Romans took the existence of miracles for granted; Christian texts reporting them offered miracles as divine proof of the Christian God's unique claim to authority: "of all worships, the Christian best and most particularly advertised its miracles by driving out of spirits and laying on of hands". The Gospel of John is structured around miraculous "signs": The success of the Apostles, according to the church historian Eusebius of Caesarea, lay in their miracles: "though laymen in their language", he asserted, "they drew courage from divine, miraculous powers". The conversion of Constantine by a miraculous sign in heaven is a prominent fourth-century example.

Since the Age of Enlightenment, miracles have often needed to be rationalized: C.S. Lewis, Norman Geisler, William Lane Craig, and other 20th-century Christians have argued that miracles are reasonable and plausible. For example, Lewis said that a miracle is something that comes totally out of the blue. If for thousands of years a woman can become pregnant only by sexual intercourse with a man, then if she were to become pregnant without a man, it would be a miracle. Others argue that Jesus's healing miracles dealt with conversion and somatization disorders, could manifest as blindness, paralysis etc. In a Mediterranean context, healing was also defined as restoring a person's social standing. Some diseases, like leprosy, caused immense social stigma.

There have been numerous claims of miracles by people of most Christian denominations, including but not limited to faith healings and exorcisms. Miracle reports are especially prevalent in Roman Catholicism and Pentecostal or Charismatic churches.

==== Catholic Church ====
The Catholic Church believes miracles are works of God, either directly, or through the prayers and intercessions of a specific saint or saints. There is usually a specific purpose connected to a miracle, e.g. the conversion of a person or persons to the Catholic faith or the construction of a church desired by God. The church says that it tries to be very cautious to approve the validity of putative miracles. The Catholic Church also says that it maintains particularly stringent requirements in validating the miracle's authenticity. The process is overseen by the Congregation for the Causes of Saints.

The Catholic Church has listed several events as miracles, some of them occurring in modern times. Before a person can be accepted as a saint, they must be posthumously confirmed to have performed two miracles. In the procedure of beatification of Pope John Paul II, who died in 2005, the Vatican announced on 14 January 2011 that Pope Benedict XVI had declared that the recovery of Marie Simon-Pierre from Parkinson's disease was a miracle.

Among the more notable miracles approved by the church are several Eucharistic miracles wherein the sacramental species of bread and wine attain the accidents of human flesh and blood. Prominent examples are the Miracle of Lanciano and of Santarém.

According to 17th century documents, a young Spanish man's leg was miraculously restored to him in 1640 after having been amputated two and a half years earlier.

Another miracle approved by the church is the Miracle of the Sun, which is said to have occurred near Fátima, Portugal on October 13, 1917. According to witnesses, between 70,000 and 100,000 people, who were gathered at a cove near Fátima, witnessed the sunlight dim and change colors, and the Sun spin, dance about in the sky, and appear to plummet towards Earth, radiating great heat in the process. After the ten-minute event, the ground and the people's clothing, which had been drenched by a previous rainstorm, were both dry.

Velankanni (Mary) can be traced to the mid-16th century and is attributed to three miracles: the apparition of Mary and the Christ Child to a slumbering shepherd boy, the curing of a lame buttermilk vendor, and the rescue of Portuguese sailors from a violent sea storm.

In addition to these, the Catholic Church attributes miraculous causes to many otherwise inexplicable phenomena on a case-by-case basis. Only after all other possible explanations have been asserted to be inadequate will the church assume divine intervention and declare the miracle worthy of veneration by their followers. The church does not, however, enjoin belief in any extra-Scriptural miracle as an article of faith or as necessary for salvation.

Thomas Aquinas, a prominent Doctor of the Church, divided miracles into three types in his Summa contra Gentiles:

Things that are at times divinely accomplished, apart from the generally established order in things, are customarily called miracles; for we admire with some astonishment a certain event when we observe the effect but do not know its cause. And since one and the same cause is at times known to some people and unknown to others, the result is that of several who see an effect at the same time, some are moved to admiring astonishment, while others are not. For instance, the astronomer is not astonished when he sees an eclipse of the sun, for he knows its cause, but the person who is ignorant of this science must be amazed, for he ignores the cause. And so, a certain event is wondrous to one person, but not so to another. So, a thing that has a completely hidden cause is wondrous in an unqualified way, and this the name, miracle, suggests; namely, what is of itself filled with admirable wonder, not simply in relation to one person or another. Now, absolutely speaking, the cause hidden from every man is God. In fact, we proved above that no man in the present state of life can grasp His essence intellectually. Therefore, those things must properly be called miraculous which are done by divine power apart from the order generally followed in things.

Now, there are various degrees and orders of these miracles. Indeed, the highest rank among miracles is held by those events in which something is done by God which nature never could do. For example, that two bodies should be coincident; that the sun reverse its course, or stand still; that the sea open up and offer a way through which people may pass. And even among these an order may be observed. For the greater the things that God does are, and the more they are removed from the capacity of nature, the greater the miracle is. Thus, it is more miraculous for the sun to reverse its course than for the sea to be divided.

Then, the second degree among miracles is held by those events in which God does something which nature can do, but not in this order. It is a work of nature for an animal to live, to see, and to walk; but for it to live after death, to see after becoming blind, to walk after paralysis of the limbs, this nature cannot do—but God at times does such works miraculously. Even among this degree of miracles a gradation is evident, according as what is done is more removed from the capacity of nature.

Now, the third degree of miracles occurs when God does what is usually done by the working of nature, but without the operation of the principles of nature. For example, a person may be cured by divine power from a fever which could be cured naturally, and it may rain independently of the working of the principles of nature.

The Catholic humanitarian Mother Teresa believed in humble miracles of healing, stating "The miracle is not that we do this work, but that we are happy to do it."

==== Evangelicalism ====
For a majority of Evangelical Christians, biblicism ensures that the miracles described in the Bible are still relevant and may be present in the life of the believer. Healings, academic or professional successes, the birth of a child after several attempts, the end of an addiction, etc., would be tangible examples of God's intervention with the faith and prayer, by the Holy Spirit. In the 1980s, the neo-charismatic movement re-emphasized miracles and faith healing. In certain churches, a special place is thus reserved for faith healings with laying on of hands during worship services or for campaigns evangelization. Faith healing or divine healing is considered to be an inheritance of Jesus acquired by his death and resurrection.

=== Hinduism ===
In Hinduism, miracles are focused on episodes of liberation of the spirit. A key example is the revelation of Krishna to Arjuna, wherein Krishna persuades Arjuna to rejoin the battle against his cousins by briefly and miraculously giving Arjuna the power to see the true scope of the Universe, and its sustainment within Krishna, which requires divine vision. This is a typical situation in Hindu mythology wherein "wondrous acts are performed for the purpose of bringing spiritual liberation to those who witness or read about them".

A famous figure is Sai Baba of Shirdi, said to be an avatar who performed many miracles that were supposedly witnessed by British officials.

Hindu sages have criticized both expectation and reliance on miracles as cheats, situations where people have sought to earn a benefit without doing the work necessary to merit it. Miracles continue to be occasionally reported in the practice of Hinduism, with an example of a modern miracle reported in Hinduism being the Hindu milk miracle of September 1995, with additional occurrences in 2006 and 2010, wherein statues of certain Hindu deities were seen to drink milk offered to them.

=== Islam ===
In the Quran, a miracle can be defined as a supernatural intervention in the life of human beings. According to this definition, miracles are present "in a threefold sense: in sacred history, in connection with Muhammad himself and in relation to revelation". The Quran does not use the technical Arabic word for miracle (Muʿd̲j̲iza) literally meaning "that by means of which [the Prophet] confounds, overwhelms, his opponents". It rather uses the term 'Ayah' (literally meaning sign). The term Ayah is used in the Quran in the above-mentioned threefold sense: it refers to the "verses" of the Quran (believed to be the divine speech in human language; presented by Muhammad as his chief miracle); as well as to miracles of it and the signs (particularly those of creation).

To defend the possibility of miracles and God's omnipotence against the encroachment of the independent secondary causes, some medieval Muslim theologians such as Al-Ghazali rejected the idea of cause and effect in essence, but accepted it as something that facilitates humankind's investigation and comprehension of natural processes. They argued that the nature was composed of uniform atoms that were "re-created" at every instant by God. Thus, if the soil was to fall, God would have to create and re-create the accident of heaviness for as long as the soil was to fall. For Muslim theologians, the laws of nature were only the customary sequence of apparent causes: customs of God.

Sufi biographical literature records claims of miraculous accounts of men and women. The miraculous prowess of the Sufi holy men includes firasa (clairvoyance), the ability to disappear from sight, and to become completely invisible. The holy men reportedly tame wild beasts and traverse long distances in a very short time span. They could also produce food and rain in seasons of drought, heal the sick and help barren women conceive.

=== Judaism ===
Descriptions of miracles (Hebrew Ness, נס) appear in the Tanakh. Examples include prophets, such as Elijah who performed miracles like the raising of a widow's dead son (1 Kings 17:17–24) and Elisha whose miracles include multiplying the poor widow's jar of oil (2 Kings 4:1–7) and restoring to life the son of the woman of Shunem (2 Kings 4:18–37). The Torah describes many miracles related to Moses during his time as a prophet and the Exodus of the Israelites. Parting the Red Sea, and facilitating the Plagues of Egypt are among the most famous.

During the first century BCE, a variety of religious movements and splinter groups developed amongst the Jews in Judea. A number of individuals claimed to be miracle workers in the tradition of Moses, Elijah, and Elisha, the Jewish prophets. The Talmud provides some examples of such Jewish miracle workers, one of whom is Honi HaM'agel, who was famous for his ability to successfully pray for rain.

There are people who obscure all miracles by explaining them in terms of the laws of nature. When these heretics who do not believe in miracles disappear and faith increases in the world, then the Mashiach will come. For the essence of the Redemption primarily depends on this – that is, on faith

— Rebbe Nachman of Breslov

Most Chasidic communities are rife with tales of miracles that follow a yechidut, a spiritual audience with a tzadik: barren women become pregnant, cancer tumors shrink, and wayward children become pious. Many Hasidim claim that miracles can take place in merit of partaking of the shirayim (the leftovers from the rebbe's meal), such as miraculous healing or blessings of wealth or piety.

== Criticism ==
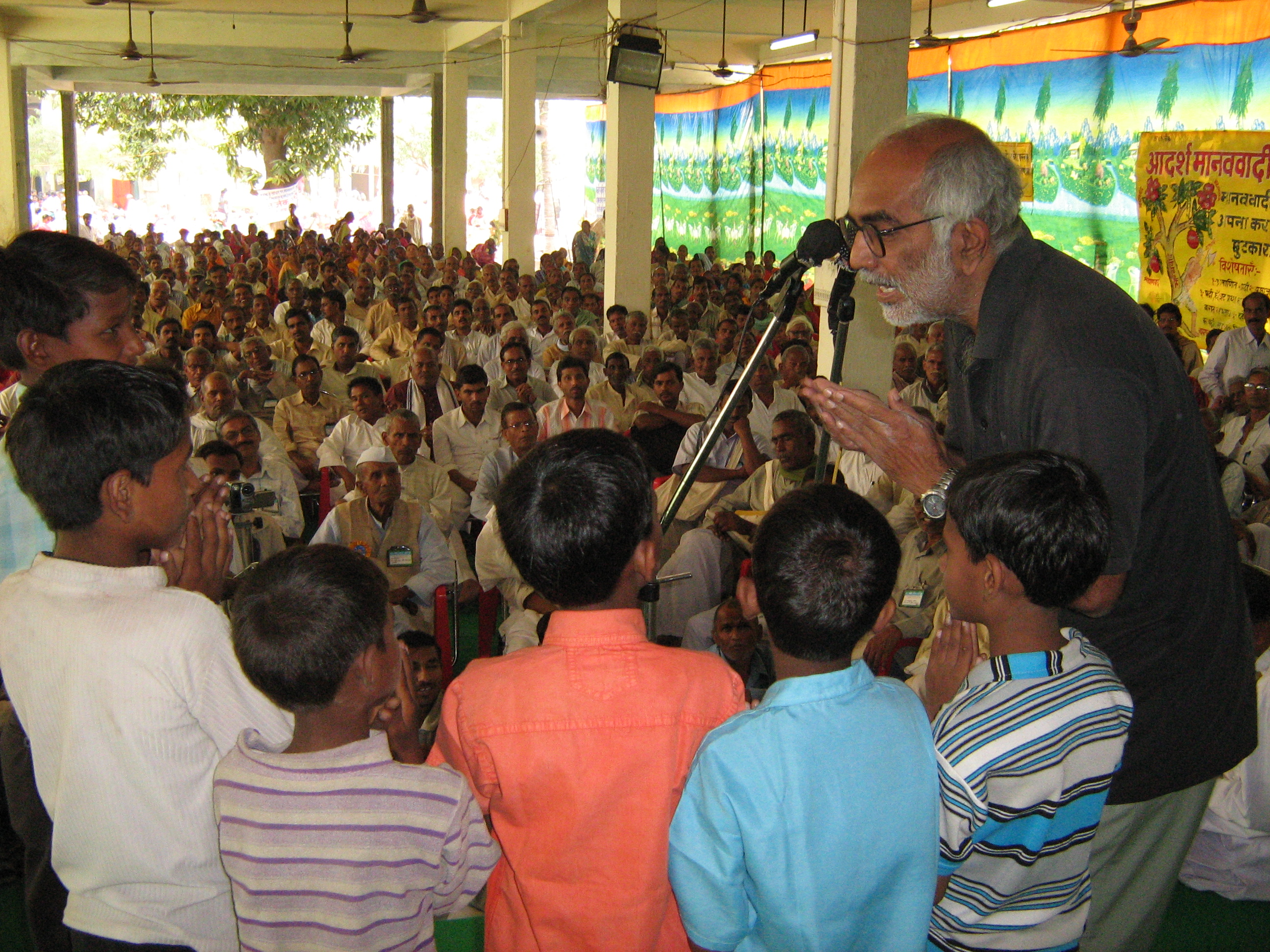
Rationalist, sceptic, and godman debunker Narendra Nayak during a miracle-exposure program in 2007

Thomas Paine, one of the Founding Fathers of the American Revolution, wrote, "All the tales of miracles, with which the Old and New Testament are filled, are fit only for impostors to preach and fools to believe."

Thomas Jefferson, principal author of the Declaration of Independence of the United States, edited a version of the Bible in which he removed sections of the New Testament containing supernatural aspects as well as perceived misinterpretations he believed had been added by the Four Evangelists. Jefferson wrote, "The establishment of the innocent and genuine character of this benevolent moralist, and the rescuing it from the imputation of imposture, which has resulted from artificial systems, [footnote: e.g. The virgin birth of Jesus, his deification, the creation of the world by him, his miraculous powers, his resurrection and visible ascension, his corporeal presence in the Eucharist, the Trinity; original sin, atonement, regeneration, election, orders of Hierarchy, etc. —T.J.] invented by ultra-Christian sects, unauthorized by a single word ever uttered by him, is a most desirable object, and one to which Priestley has successfully devoted his labors and learning."

American Revolutionary War patriot Ethan Allen wrote, "In those parts of the world where learning and science have prevailed, miracles have ceased; but in those parts of it as are barbarous and ignorant, miracles are still in vogue."

Robert Ingersoll wrote, "Not 20 people were convinced by the reported miracles of Christ, and yet people of the nineteenth century were coolly asked to be convinced on hearsay by miracles which those who are supposed to have seen them refused to credit."

Elbert Hubbard, American writer, publisher, artist, and philosopher, wrote, "A miracle is an event described by those to whom it was told by people who did not see it."

Biologist Richard Dawkins has criticised the belief in miracles as a subversion of Occam's razor.

Mathematician Charles Hermite, in a discourse upon the world of mathematical truths and the physical world, stated that, "The synthesis of the two is revealed partially in the marvellous correspondence between abstract mathematics on the one hand and all the branches of physics on the other."

Baden Powell, an English mathematician and Church of England priest, stated that if God is a lawgiver, then a "miracle" would break the lawful edicts that had been issued at Creation. Therefore, a belief in miracles would be entirely atheistic.

== See also ==
- A Course in Miracles – 1976 book by Helen Schucman
- Act of God – Natural disaster outside human control
- Cessationism – Christian theological dispute
- Deus ex machina – Device to resolve the plot of a dramatic work
- Lourdes effect – Skeptical theory regarding the ambiguity of miracles
- Magic and religion
- Miracle of Calanda – 1640 event that allegedly took place in Calanda, Spain
- Miracles (book) – Book written by C. S. Lewis
- Miracles of Joseph Smith
- Miracle of the Sun – Purported miracle in 1917
- Natural Supernaturalism – Philosophical concept developed by Thomas Carlyle
- Our Lady of Lourdes – Title of Mary, mother of Jesus
- Our Lady of Medjugorje – Alleged visions of Mary, mother of Jesus
- Paranormal – Purported phenomena beyond the scope of normal scientific understanding
- Pieter De Rudder
- Relic – Object of religious significance from the past
- Royal touch – Healing power supposedly possessed by monarchs
- Scientific skepticism – Questioning of claims lacking empirical evidence
- Signs and wonders – Experiences that are perceived to be miraculous
- Snake oil – Euphemism for false advertising
- Spontaneous remission – Diminution or abatement of a disease over time, without formal treatment ("medical miracles")
- Superstitions in Muslim societies

== Notes and references ==
=== General references and books ===
- Brown, Colin. Miracles and the Critical Mind. Grand Rapids: Eerdmans, 1984.
- Desmond, Adrian; Moore, James (1991). Darwin. London: Michael Joseph, Penguin Group. ISBN 0-7181-3430-3.
- Chavda, Mahesh. Only Love Can Make a Miracle. Charlotte: Mahesh Chavda Ministries, 1990.
- Bontrager, Krista, "It's a Miracle! Or, is it?", Reasons.org Archived 2006-02-07 at the Wayback Machine
- Eisen, Robert (1995). Gersonides on Providence, Covenant, and the Chosen People. State University of New York Press.
- Goodman, Lenn E. (1985). Rambam: Readings in the Philosophy of Moses Maimonides. Gee Bee Tee.
- Humphreys, Colin J. Miracles of Exodus. Harper, San Francisco, 2003.
- Kellner, Menachem (1986). Dogma in Medieval Jewish Thought. Oxford University Press.
- Lewis, C.S. Miracles: A Preliminary Study. New York, Macmillan Co., 1947.
- Moule, C. F. D. (ed.). Miracles: Cambridge Studies in their Philosophy and History. London, A.R. Mowbray 1966, ©1965 (Survey of Biblical miracles as well).
- Twelftree, Graham. Jesus the Miracle Worker: A Historical and Theological Study. IVP, 1999.
- Woodward, Kenneth L. (2000). The Book of Miracles. New York: Simon & Schuster. ISBN 0684823934.
- Keener, Craig S. (2011). Miracles: The Credibility of the New Testament Accounts. Grand Rapids, MI: Baker Academic. ISBN 978-0801039522. OCLC 699760418.
