= Manuel Mindán Manero =

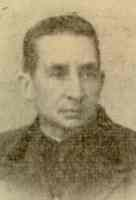
- Born: 2 December 1902; Calanda
- Died: 19 September 2006 (aged 103); Madrid

Manuel Mindán Manero (2 December 1902, in Calanda, Spain – 19 September 2006, in Madrid) was an Aragonese philosopher and priest. Doctor of Philosophy in 1951, from the University of Madrid, he served as professor and civil servant at the Ramiro de Maeztu Institute in Madrid, being secretary of the Luis Vives Institute of Philosophy of the CSIC and director for 25 years of the Spanish Journal of Philosophy.

== Publications ==
- La persona humana. Aspectos filosófico, social y religioso (1962)
- Historia de la filosofía y de las ciencias (1964)
- Andrés Piquer, filosofía y medicina en la España del siglo XVIII (1991)
- Recuerdos de mi niñez (1992)
- Testigo de noventa años de historia. Conversaciones con un amigo en el último recodo del camino (1995)
- Conocimiento, verdad y libertad (1996)
- Historia del Instituto 'Ramiro de Maeztu' de Madrid (2001)
- Reflexiones sobre el hombre, la vida, el tiempo, el amor y la libertad (2002)
- Mi vida vista desde los cien años (2004)

== Recognition ==
- Comendadores de la Orden de Alfonso X el Sabio (1999)
