= Pious fraud =

Fraud in religion or medicine

Pious fraud (Latin: pia fraus, Italian: santo inganno) or pious deception, is used to describe fraud in religion or medicine. A pious fraud can be counterfeiting a miracle or falsely attributing a sacred text to a biblical figure and promoting holy relics, due to the belief that the "end justifies the means", in this case the end goal of increasing faith by whatever means available.

== Use of the phrase ==
The expression may originate from Ovid's Metamorphoses, which tells the story of a Cretan who desperately wanted a son, and announced that if a daughter were born, she would be killed. After a girl was indeed born, a goddess advised the mother to pass her off as a boy, which was simple as the father had already chosen Iphis, a gender-neutral name used in antiquity.

"Thus, the concealment remained undetected through pious deception"
"inde incepta pia mendacia fraude latebant" –Book 9, 710-711, Metamorphoses

The Oxford English Dictionary reports the phrase is first known to have been used in English in 1678. Edward Gibbon was particularly fond of the phrase, using it often in his monumental and controversial work The History of the Decline and Fall of the Roman Empire, in which he criticized the likelihood of some of the martyrs and miracles of the early Christian church.

Friederich Nietzsche translates pia fraus, as "holy lie" in many of his writings, like Twilight of the Idols, The Antichrist and The Will to Power.

William W. Howells wrote that shamans know that their tricks are impostures, but that all who studied them agree that they really believe in their power to deal with spirits. According to Howells, their main purpose is an honest one and they believe that this justifies the means of hoodwinking their followers in minor technical matters.

== In religious contexts ==
The 14th century Catholic bishop Nicole Oresme, called attention to the Shroud of Turin as a major case of fake venerated objects being used by clergymen to "elicit offerings for their churches".

An Italian priest Lorenzo Valla was first to undermine the legitimacy of the Donation of Constantine, which was a document created to bolster the authority and power of the Pope.

Martin Luther a Protestant reformer had complained that: "What lies there are about relics! One claims to have a feather from the wing of the angel Gabriel, and the bishop of Mainz has a flame from Moses’ burning bush. And how does it happen that eighteen apostles are buried in Germany when Christ had only twelve?" John Calvin another reformer, would write a Treatise on Relics, about the problem of relic forgeries since the time of Augustine of Hippo.

In Isaac Newton's 1690 dissertation, An Historical Account of Two Notable Corruptions of Scripture, he blames the "Roman Church" for many abuses in the world, accusing it of "pious frauds".

Joseph Mazzini Wheeler, accused the writings of early Church fathers like Clement, Ignatius, Polycarp and Eusebius of being mired in "pious frauds" and superstitions. Jacob Burckhardt strongly characterized Eusebius of Caesarea in particular as the "first thoroughly dishonest historian of antiquity." Eusebius has also been charged by bible scholar Kenneth Olson as intentionally manipulating history to serve religious ends.

Reverend August Kampmeier in 1907, wrote an article entitled Pious Fraud, published in The Open Court. His discussed cases were the "discovery" of the Book of the Law in 2 Kings 22, the Book of Daniel which he said is well known to actually be written 400 years later during the Maccabean period, as well as New Testament writers using Old Testament passages to construct prophecy. Kampmeier's critiques would later be engaged with by C. B. Wilmer, alongside Joseph C. Allen, and editor Paul Carus in their own response called In Extenuation of Pious Fraud: Comments on Rev. A. Kampmeier's Article.

Frank Hill Perrycoste, in his 1913 book On the Influence of Religion Upon Truthfulness, within chapters The Influence of Religion in Pious Frauds and In Promoting Pious Frauds. He claimed Jews, Christians and Muslims have a long history of engaging in pious fraud. Perrycoste gave examples of supposed "fraudulent" material, such as the Book of Enoch, which later fathers like Tertullian had full confidence. Others included Testaments of the Twelve Patriarchs, correspondences between Christ and Abgarus of Edessa, the Acts of Pilate which Justin Martyr appealed to, and legends about Paul and Thecla.

Joe Nickell an investigator of the paranormal considered the phenomenon and promotion of stigmata to be a form of "pious hoax". He would also argue it is possible the Tilma's creation associated with Our Lady of Guadalupe was a deliberate painted commission and pious fraud to hasten the conversion of Indians during the Spanish colonization of the Americans.

Candida Moss in her 2013 work the Myth of Persecution, acknowledges very real persecution against Christians under the Roman empire. However, she makes the case that many martyrdom stories were "pious exaggerations", or invented legendary accounts similar to Jewish and Greco-Roman noble death traditions, created to inspire faith and strengthen the Church.

In 2018, it was revealed by journalist Dimitris Alikakos, and bishop Samuel Agoyan of the Armenian Orthodox diocese in Jerusalem that the Holy Fire was not miraculous. The priest who has participated in the ceremony, stated in an interview that it is the patriarch himself who brings in a lamp and match into the chamber to ignite the flame. The British historian Edward Gibbon had previously written in the 18th century with regard to the event, stating:

This pious fraud, first devised in the ninth century, was devoutly cherished by the Latin crusaders, and is annually repeated by the clergy of the Greek, Armenian, and Coptic sects, who impose on the credulous spectators for their own benefit and that of their tyrants. In every age, a principle of toleration has been fortified by a sense of interest; and the revenue of the prince and his emir was increased each year by the expense and tribute of so many thousand strangers.

== Thomas Jefferson ==
Thomas Jefferson wrote to a friend and doctor in 1807:

One of the most successful physicians I have ever known, has assured me, that he used more bread pills, drops of coloured water, and powders of hickory ashes, than of all other medicines put together. It was certainly a pious fraud.

— Placebo Effects and Science Journalism at the Mind/Body Boundary. Steve Silberman, The Journal of Mind-Body Regulation, 2011

During later years in a 1816 letter to Horatio G. Spafford, Jefferson would write:

You judge truly that I am not afraid of the priests. They have tried upon me all their various batteries, of pious whining, hypocritical canting, lying & slandering, without being able to give me one moment of pain. I have contemplated their order from the Magi of the East to the Saints of the West, and I have found no difference of character, bit of more or less caution, in proportion to their information or ignorance of those on whom their interested duperies were to be paid off.

== See also ==
- Apocrypha
- Faith healing
- Forgery
- Hoax
- Interpolation
- Lying
- Noble lie
- Pious fiction
- Relics associated with Jesus
- Religious fraud
