= Verso l'alto =

Phrase associated with Pier Giorgio Frassati

"Verso l'alto" (lit. 'Towards the top') is a motto that is widely associated with Pier Giorgio Frassati, an early 20th-century Italian mountaineer and canonised saint.

== Origin ==
Frassati wrote the motto, verso l'alto, an Italian phrase for "toward the top" or "to the heights", on a photo of his final mountaineering before his death in 1925. In Italian, the word "alto" comes from the Latin "altum", which appears in Luke 5:4: "Duc in altum." This phrase from the chapter and the verses mean "Put out into the deep", the deep waters, including leaving behind the comfort of shallows or taking a risk for the catch. In Gloria, the "alto" also appears as "Gloria in excelsis Deo" and is translated "Gloria a Dio nell’alto dei cieli". "Gloria a Dio nell’alto dei cieli" means "the heights of heaven" or simply "the highest".

== Meaning of the phrase ==
"Verso l'alto" is a descriptive symbol, or a metaphor, that emerges from the "deep interiority of a saint to offer some orientation for those of us drawn to the mountains". In other words, this phrase does not have to do with climbing to a summit of a mountain, but expressing the "Eucharist heart in a body that climbs, and a soul that remains spiritually oriented towards a different summit."

== Legacy ==
Since "verso l'alto" became Frassati's signature phrase, Pope Leo XIV quoted it during his canonization alongside with Carlo Acutis on 7 September 2025: "The day of my death will be the most beautiful day of my life. In his last photo, which shows him climbing a mountain in the Val di Lanzo, with his face turned towards his goal, he wrote: Verso l'alto." On Leo XIV's 70th birthday, the first time the Church had a 70-year-old pope since 1990, the phrase provides an image of Sunday's mass during the year of the beautification of Frassati.
