= Carlo Giuseppe Maria Acutis =

Italian businessman (born 1938)

CEO of Toro Assicurazioni
- In office 1969–1987

Personal details
- Born: 17 October 1938 (age 87) Turin, Italy
- Relatives: Carlo Acutis (grandson)

Carlo Giuseppe Maria Acutis (born 17 October 1938) is an Italian businessman.

== Early life ==
Carlo Acutis was born in Turin in 1938 into a middle-class family originally from Ternengo, in the province of Biella. In 1969, he became CEO of Toro Assicurazioni.

In 1986, Vittoria Assicurazioni separated from the Toro Group and became independent. Carlo Acutis acquired the insurance company, listing it on the Milan Stock Exchange in 1988 and remaining at its helm until 2018. He retains the title of honorary chairman of Vittoria Assicurazioni, having passed the chairmanship to his son, Andrea.

In addition to his other activities, he is vice-president of the Piedmont Foundation for Cancer Research and an advisor to the Lingotto Musica association. He is a member of the Geneva Association, which addresses the role of insurance companies in the face of risks related to climate change.

== Personal life ==
In the 1960s, he married the Warsawian Maria Henrietta Perlowska. He is the grandfather of Carlo Acutis and the twins Michele and Francesca.

== Honours ==

Knight of Legion of Honour, 1995

Knight of Order of Merit for Labour, 1998

== Bibliography ==
- Luigi Guatri, Vite vissute, EGEA SpA, 14 janvier 2014, ISBN 978-88-238-7605-7
