= Patron saint of the Internet =

Patron saint of the Internet may refer to:

- Carlo Acutis (1991–2006), canonized Italian teenager and programmer
- Isidore of Seville (c.560–636), Hispano-Roman scholar and saint
