= Adélaïde Ametis =

Italian painter (1877–1949)

- Born: 17 February 1877; Turin
- Died: 18 June 1949 (aged 72)
- Known for: painting
- Spouse: Alfredo Frassati
- Children: Pier Giorgio Frassati; Luciana Frassati Gawronska

Adélaïde Ametis Frassati (17 February 1877 – 18 June 1949) was an Italian painter who had paintings commissioned by the King of Italy Victor Emmanuel III.

== Life ==
Adélaïde Ametis was born in Turin, Italy in 1877. On 5 September 1898 she married Alfredo Frassati who would be the founder of the newspaper La Stampa in 1900. The marriage was not happy and the couple competed with each other. It was said that only their children and religion kept them together. The children had a governess and Adelaide is reported to have spent her time in "self affirmation". She was successful and would spend her time visiting the upper classes and smoking cigars. Her husband was said to have romantic interludes and Adelaide's friendship with the painter Alberto Falchetti was a source for speculation.

Ametis obtained commissions from the King of Italy Victor Emmanuel III, and she exhibited paintings in the National exhibition in Brera in 1915 and 1916. In 1922, she exhibited at the Venice Biennale.

== Family ==
From her marriage, her children included a son Pier Giorgio Frassati, who died of poliomyelitis in 1925, and who was beatified by Pope John Paul II and declared patron saint of sportsmen. Her daughter Luciana Frassati Gawronska, a writer and author, was born on 18 August 1902 (died 7 October 2007), and was the mother of Italian MEP and parliamentarian Jas Gawronski.

After her son's death in 1925, he was placed in the family crypt in Pollone and Ametis decorated the walls. After her son was beatified, his body was removed. On the death of Luciana in 2007, she was placed in the crypt's vacant position.
