= Carlo Acutis =

Italian saint (1991–2006)

Saint Carlo Acutis
- Born: 3 May 1991; London, England, United Kingdom
- Died: 12 October 2006 (aged 15); Monza, Italy
- Cause of death: Leukaemia
- Resting place: Santa Maria Maggiore, Assisi
- Venerated in: Catholic Church
- Beatified: 10 October 2020, Basilica of Saint Francis of Assisi, Assisi, Italy by Cardinal Agostino Vallini (on behalf of Pope Francis)
- Canonized: 7 September 2025, Saint Peter's Square, Vatican City by Pope Leo XIV
- Feast: 12 October
- Attributes: Laptop, monstrance, red polo shirt

Carlo Acutis (3 May 1991 – 12 October 2006) was an English-born Italian Catholic teenager known for his devotion to the Eucharist and his use of digital media to promote Catholic devotion. Born in London and raised in Milan, he developed an early interest in computers and video games, teaching himself programming and web design and assisting his parish and school with digital projects.

Active in parish life, he served as a catechist and helped inspire several people to convert to Catholicism. He later collected information about Eucharistic miracles and Marian apparitions. He was diagnosed with acute promyelocytic leukaemia and died at the age of fifteen. Since his death, his relics have been displayed in Assisi, and his exhibitions on Eucharistic miracles have travelled worldwide.

In 2020, he was beatified by the Catholic Church after its recognition of a 2013 miracle in Campo Grande attributed to his intercession. A second miracle in Italy was attributed to him in 2024, making him eligible for canonisation. Acutis was canonised on 7 September 2025, alongside Pier Giorgio Frassati. Acutis is the first millennial to become a Catholic saint, and has been referred to as the "patron saint of the Internet" and "God's influencer".

A commentator for the Catholic Review has written that skepticism for Acutis' canonisation cause exists among some of the faithful and the secular world, noting that his short life offered few extraordinary actions. A report by The Economist interviewed childhood friends of Acutis, who recalled him as kind but not necessarily pious or religious. Questions have also been raised about financial support provided by Acutis's family, suggesting that it may have accelerated the process. Nicola Gori, Acutis' postulator, stated that money did not influence the cause.

== Early life ==
Carlo Acutis was born on 3 May 1991 in London as the eldest child of Italian parents Andrea Acutis and Antonia Salzano, members of wealthy Italian families. His grand-father was businessman Carlo Giuseppe Maria Acutis. Acutis's parents worked in London and Germany before he was born, and moved back to Italy and settled in Milan shortly after his birth in May 1991. His parents were in family businesses: his father's family worked in the Italian insurance industry, and his mother ran a publishing company. Acutis's maternal great-grandmother was born in the United States and came from a family of landowners in New York. Aside from a few visits to a day care centre, most of Acutis's early care came from nannies.

In September 1997, Acutis attended his first primary school, the San Carlo Institute in Milan. As the school was at a distance from their home, three months later he transferred to the Marcelline Tommaseo Institute, run by the Sisters of St. Marcellina. Upon completing middle school, Acutis went on to the Jesuit Instituto Leone XIII high school.

== Religious life ==
His baptism took place on 18 May 1991, two weeks after his birth, in the Church of Our Lady of Dolours, Chelsea. His paternal grandfather, Carlo, was his godfather, and his maternal grandmother, Luana, was his godmother. Neither of his parents were religious. Acutis's mother Antonia grew up in a secular family. She was confirmed while she was in college and was married in the church, but she did not attend Mass before Acutis was born. She testified that her son's faith and his insistent questions brought her back to the faith. At the time of his death he was an only child, but in 2010 his parents had twins on the anniversary of Acutis's death, which his mother attributed to his intercession.

When Acutis displayed an interest in Catholic religious practice, his questions were answered by the family's Polish babysitter. In the summer, Acutis would stay with his mother's parents in Centola, a town in the Salerno province of Campania. After spending the day at the beach, he would join a number of older women in the local parish church to pray the rosary. His family also owned a boat at Santa Margherita Ligure, near the Basilica of St. Margaret of Antiochia. On 16 June 1998, when he was seven years old, Acutis received his First Holy Communion at the convent of Sant'Ambrogio ad Nemus, Milan. Acutis was also a frequent communicant, often in the Ambrosian Rite, and attended Eucharistic Adoration. His attendance at the latter has led him to often be depicted with a monstrance. He was confirmed five years later on 24 May 2003 at Santa Maria Segreta Church in Milan.

The Acutis family employed a Hindu immigrant from Mauritius, Rajesh Mohur, to work in their household. He and Acutis became friends. In time, after speaking with Acutis about Christianity, Mohur asked to be baptised. A friend of Mohur's, Seeven Kistnen, also converted and was baptised after meeting with Acutis and hearing him speak about the faith. Mohur's mother, visiting from Mauritius, attended Mass with Mohur and Acutis, who talked with her at length afterwards, and she too asked to be baptised.

Acutis showed an interest in the lives of saints, especially Francis of Assisi, Anthony of Padua, Padre Pio, Francisco and Jacinta Marto, Dominic Savio, Tarcisius, Bernadette Soubirous, and Mary Magdalene de' Pazzi. He is said to have prayed to his guardian angel frequently and exhibited a special devotion to St. Michael the Archangel. When Acutis was 12 years old, he became a catechist in his parish, Santa Maria Segreta. At the time, the Italian catechetical structure typically relied on young team leaders in youth groups, as contrasted with adults, to deliver religious education to their peers. Acutis's parish priest said of him that:

Carlo was a young man who was exceptionally transparent. He really wanted to progress in loving his parents, God, his classmates, and those who loved him less. He wanted to apply himself in his studies to educate himself in his catechism class as well as in school and computer science.

In 2006 Acutis told his mother and grandmother of his intention to become a priest.

== Work with computers and technology ==
When Acutis was 14, his parish priest asked him to create a webpage for his parish, Santa Maria Segreta in Milan. After this, a priest at his high school asked him to create a website to promote volunteering. For this work, he won a national competition called Sarai volontario (Italian, "You will be a volunteer"). Acutis was fascinated by Eucharistic miracles and maintained a list of the Marian apparitions recognised by the Catholic Church. A website based on his notes was unveiled on 4 October 2006, the Feast of St. Francis, only days before his death. Because he was hospitalised, Acutis was not able to attend the debut of his exhibition at Rome's Church of San Carlo Borromeo. The exhibition was also presented at his high school, the Leo XIII Institute. Depictions of Acutis often show him with a laptop computer.

== Illness and death ==
On about 1 October 2006, Acutis developed an inflammation of the throat. His parents took him to a doctor, who diagnosed him with parotitis and dehydration. A few days later, Acutis's pain worsened and he had blood in his urine. By Sunday, 8 October, he was too weak to get out of bed for Mass. Acutis was brought to a clinic specialising in blood diseases, and was diagnosed with acute promyelocytic leukaemia. He was given little chance of recovery. He was rushed to intensive care and put on a ventilator. After a sleepless night, Acutis was transferred to San Gerardo Hospital north of Milan.

The hospital staff called in their chaplain to administer the anointing of the sick. Acutis offered his suffering both for Pope Benedict XVI and the Catholic Church, saying: "I offer to the Lord the sufferings that I will have to undergo for the Pope and for the Church." The doctors treating his final illness had asked him if he was in great pain, to which he replied: "There are people who suffer much more than me." His final words to his mother were: "Mom, don't be afraid. Since Jesus became a man, death has become the passage towards life, and we don't need to flee it. Let us prepare ourselves to experience something extraordinary in the eternal life."

Acutis fell into a coma and was taken to the intensive care unit for a blood-cleansing treatment. After a cerebral hemorrhage, he was declared brain dead on 11 October. Acutis was officially pronounced dead the next day, 12 October 2006, at 6:45 pm. He was 15 years old.

His mother, Antonia Salzano, said that since childhood, Carlo made prophetic remarks about his death. Notably, he said that he would die when he weighs 70 kilograms, that he would die because a vein breaks in his brain and that he would always stay young. All of these came true.

=== Funeral and enshrinement ===
His parents brought his body home to lie in repose, and people came to pay their last respects for four days. A crowd of strangers attended his funeral, including young people who had abandoned the Church, and those who returned for a memorial Mass three months later.

It was Acutis's final wish to be buried in Assisi. On 6 April 2019, his body was brought to the Sanctuary of the Spoliation and venerated at its final resting place. Overnight, the procession stopped at the Cathedral of San Rufino and the diocesan choir sang a Non io, ma Dio, ("Not me, but God"), a hymn especially composed for the occasion by Marco Mammoli.

While Acutis's body may appear incorrupt behind the glass of his casket, it is actually encased in wax moulded to look like his final appearance – a common style of presenting saints' bodies so pilgrims can see how the person looked shortly after death. The rector of Santa Maria Maggiore in Assisi, where Carlo's tomb is housed, said that Acutis's body was discovered "fully integral", though not intact.

== Legacy ==
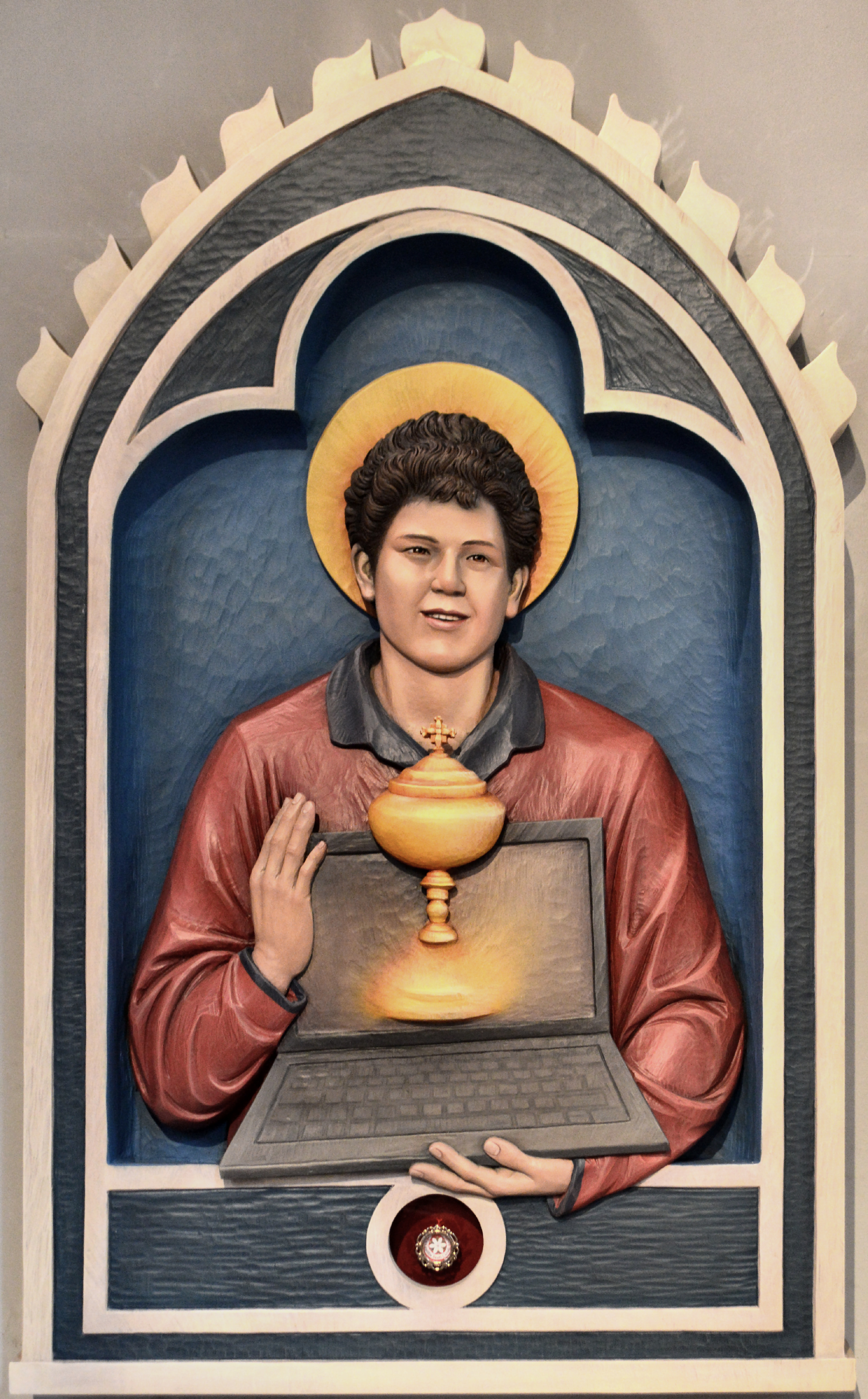
A Carlo Acutis memorial at Corpus Christi, Maiden Lane in London

Due to his enjoyment of video games in life, Acutis has been described as the "first gamer saint". A website was created for his canonisation cause. Others were created for educators, young people, and prayer groups, and for each of the four exhibitions that he inspired.

Part of Acutis' popularity has been linked to how easily young people can identify with him, symbolized in the red polo shirt he is often shown wearing.

In memory of Acutis, Bishops Raffaello Martinelli and Angelo Comastri have helped to organise a travelling photo exhibition of all the Eucharistic miracle sites. It has since travelled to dozens of different countries across five continents. The preface to the print version of the exhibit was written by Cardinal Angelo Comastri and has been translated into 18 languages. It has travelled to more than 10,000 places, including churches, congressional palaces, youth clubs, and welcome centres.

The documentary Carlo Acutis: Roadmap to Reality focuses on Acutis's faith, digital experience, and the love of Eucharist that offer hope to the youth.

== Beatification process ==
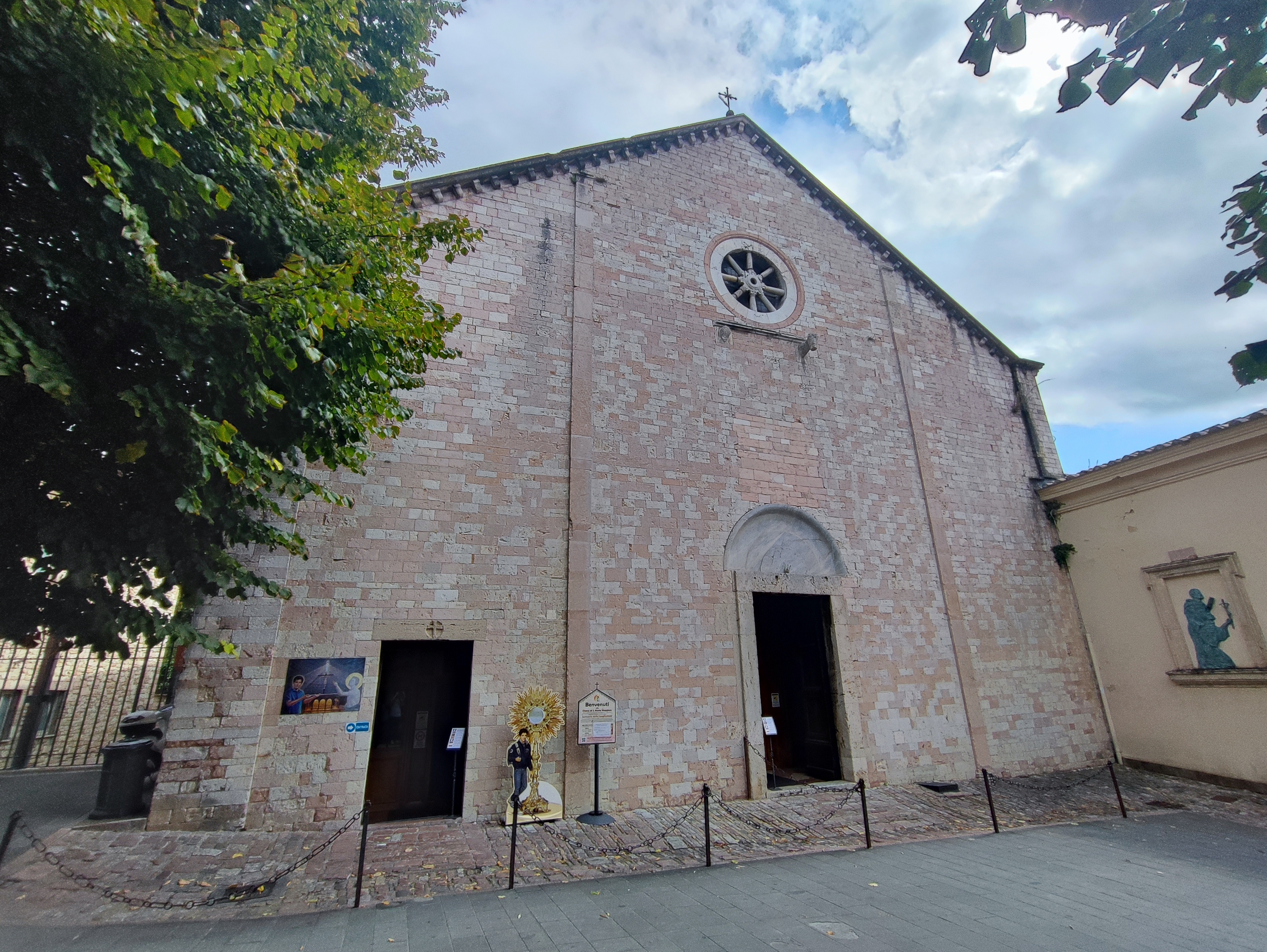
Santa Maria Maggiore, Assisi, Acutis's burial place

The call for Acutis to be beatified began soon after his death. The Church in Assisi was active in promoting Acutis's cult, the Catholic practice of venerating or showing devotion to a holy individual. Nicola Gori, who authored Carlo Acutis: The First Millennial Saint, served as the postulator for Acutis's beatification process. In this dual role, Gori was responsible for advancing the cause within the Vatican and compiling the necessary documentation.

On 12 October 2012, the sixth anniversary of his death, the Archdiocese of Milan opened his cause for canonisation. The opening of the diocesan investigation was held on 15 February 2013, with Cardinal Angelo Scola inaugurating the process. Scola said Acutis was not called to be "a movie star, but a star in Heaven" and that Acutis was "a new treasure in the Ambrosian church".

On 13 May 2013, the Congregation for the Causes of Saints issued a nihil obstat stating there was nothing preventing the cause from moving forward. He was then named a Servant of God. The Lombardy Episcopal Conference approved the petition for the official canonisation cause to proceed in 2013. Pope Francis confirmed his life as one of heroic virtue on 5 July 2018, declaring him Venerable.

=== Beatification ===
On 14 November 2019, the Vatican's Medical Council of the Congregation for the Causes of Saints expressed a positive opinion about a miracle in Brazil attributed to Acutis's intercession. In 2020 the Catholic Church recognised the curing of a child's pancreatic disease as a miracle attributed to Acutis's intercession. On the death anniversary of Acutis, Luciana Vianna had taken to Mass her son, Mattheus, who had the congenital defect of an annular pancreas which made eating difficult. Beforehand, she had prayed a novena asking for Acutis's intercession. During the prayer service that followed Mass, Mattheus kissed the clothing relic of Acutis and asked he should not "throw up as much". Immediately following the Mass, he told his mother that he felt healed and asked for solid foods when they arrived home. Until then, he had been on an all-liquid diet. His doctors subsequently confirmed a normal appearing pancreas by ultrasound. Following this, Acutis's mother told the press that her son had appeared to her in dreams saying that he would be not only beatified but also canonised a saint in the future. After a detailed investigation, Pope Francis confirmed the miracle's authenticity in a decree on 21 February 2020, leading to Acutis's beatification.

However, within a month of the decree, the beatification ceremony was postponed due to the COVID-19 pandemic in Italy, during which the country was placed on lockdown. It was rescheduled for 10 October 2020 and was held in the Upper Church of the Basilica of Saint Francis of Assisi in Assisi, Italy, with Cardinal Agostino Vallini presiding on the pope's behalf. The postulator for Acutis's cause was Nicola Gori.

=== Canonisation ===
On 23 May 2024, Pope Francis recognised a second miracle attributed to the intercession of Acutis. The miracle attributed to his intercession occurred in 2022, when a Costa Rican woman named Valeria Valverde had fallen off her bike in Florence, Italy, and suffered a brain haemorrhage with doctors giving her a low chance of survival. Her mother, Lilliana, prayed for the intercession of Acutis and visited his tomb. The same day, Valverde began to breathe independently again and was able to walk the next day with all evidence of the haemorrhage having disappeared.

On 1 July 2024, Pope Francis presided at an ordinary consistory of cardinals, which approved the canonisation of 15 people, including Carlo Acutis. On 20 November 2024, it was announced that Acutis would be canonised in the 2025 Jubilee during the Jubilee of Teenagers from 25 to 27 April 2025, with the Diocese of Assisi confirming it would be on Sunday, 27 April. However, following Pope Francis's death on 21 April 2025, Easter Monday, the Vatican announced the ceremony would have to be postponed for the papal funeral and subsequent conclave.

On 13 June 2025, Pope Leo XIV announced at a general consistory that Acutis would be canonised alongside Pier Giorgio Frassati. The canonisation took place in St. Peter's Square on 7 September 2025, presided over by Pope Leo. His parents and siblings attended and his younger brother Michele did one of the readings during Mass.

=== Criticism of process ===
A commentator in the Catholic Review noted that in his opinion scepticism for Acutis's canonisation cause existed among some of the faithful and the secular world. In a March 2025 issue of The Economist John Phipps discusses the life of Acutis, noting that "Nothing in his sparse life story explains that this ordinary-seeming teenage boy is about to become the first great saint of the 21st century." Acutis's childhood best friend claimed he did not remember Acutis as a "very pious boy", nor did he even know that Carlo was religious. His schoolmates testified that he was kind, but did not remember him to be publicly devout although they did note that he said that sex before marriage was wrong. These accounts were disputed by Carlo's mother, Antonia who also stated that he often confessed his uncertainties and insecurities as a fifteen-year-old to her: "He was aware of his fragility; he often told me he felt alone because he struggled to talk to his friends."

Acutis was canonised 19 years after his death, a relatively quick timeline by Catholic standards. The process has drawn scrutiny because it reportedly involved significant financial contributions from his family. His mother acknowledged covering expenses related to documentation, travel, and other administrative costs required for his cause. Critics have suggested that such financial support could have influenced the speed of the canonisation. His mother has said: "Normally the cause for a saint, the people behind it have to ask people to fundraise but in my situation, I do have the means to pay so that is why I have done."

In response, Gori, Acutis's postulator, told the Washington Post: "This is completely untrue. The whole process would have been the same had he been poor. It's the same for everyone. It wasn't sped up because there was money involved. If there hadn't been a fame of sanctity, it would have come to a stop."

== Shrines and relics ==
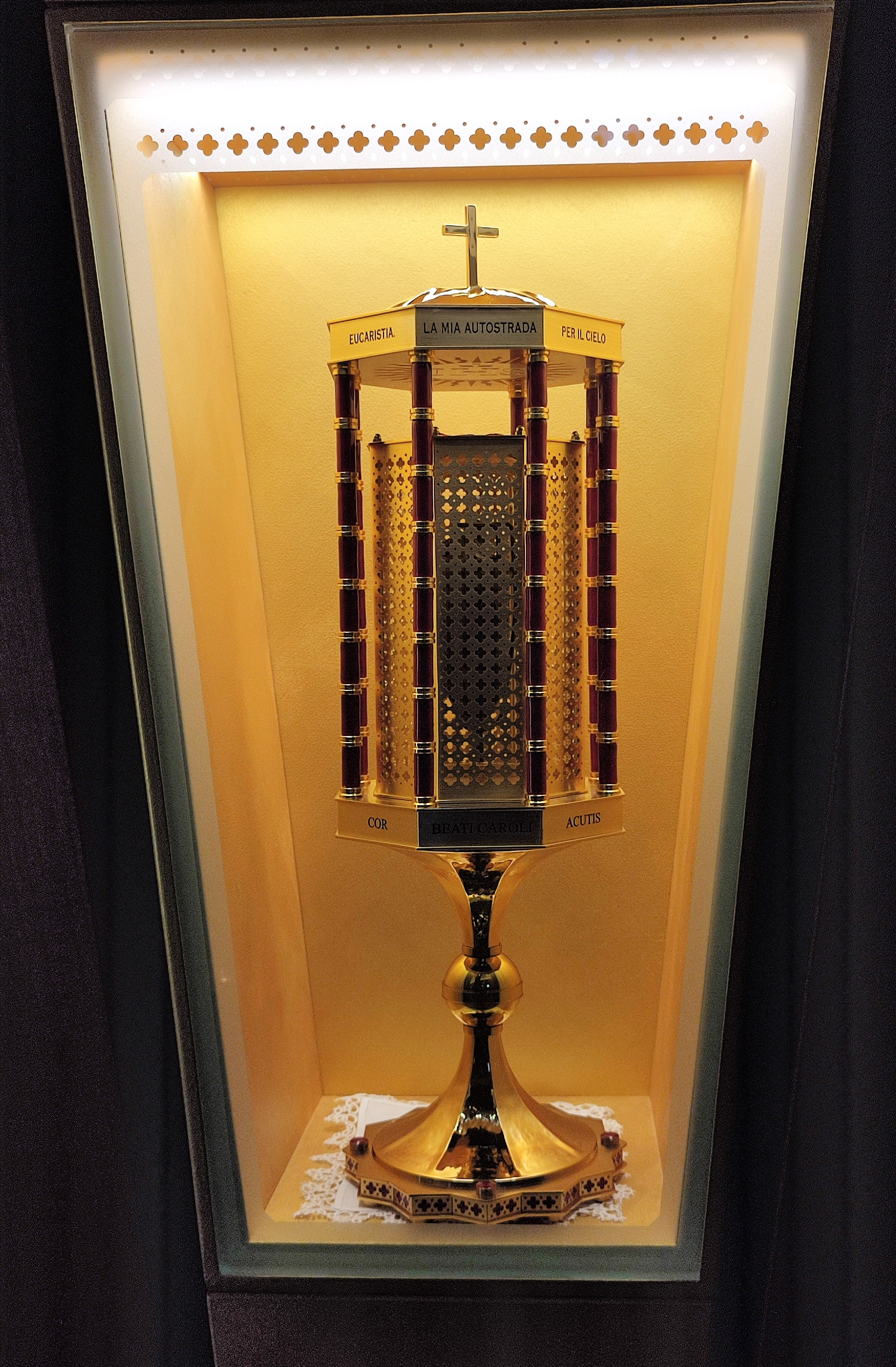
Heart relic of Carlo Acutis

Since the beatification ceremony on 10 October 2020, his relics have been on display with his tomb in the Church of Santa Maria Maggiore. The relic of the heart is preserved in the cathedral of San Rufino in Assisi, in the altar dedicated to Acutis.

A relic containing some locks of his hair is exposed for public veneration in the Church of San Francis in Rabat, on the island of Gozo, Malta. Similar relics are preserved and exhibited, since 11 September 2023, in Alife, at the sanctuary of the Madonna delle Grazie, and at the Parish of San Tommaso Apostolo in Rome, in the Infernetto district.

The church of Our Lady of Dolours in London, where Acutis was baptised, has a shrine near the font, converted from a former confessional box, where one of his hairs is held in a relic-holder.

The Catholic Church has condemned the unauthorised sale of relics purportedly belonging to Acutis. Items such as locks of hair were reportedly auctioned online for substantial sums, prompting the Diocese of Assisi to call for police intervention. Church officials condemned the sale of the relics. Italian prosecutors began an investigation into the sale of the relics.

On September 7, 2025, the world's first church dedicated to Saint Carlo Acutis was consecrated in Pallikkara, a village near Kochi, India.

== Literature ==
- Will Conquer: Carlo Acutis: A Millennial in Paradise. Sophia Institute Press 2021, ISBN 9781644134849.
- Nicola Gori: Carlo Acutis: The First Millennial Saint. Our Sunday Visitor, 2021.
