= Carlo Acutis: Roadmap to Reality =

2025 documentary film

Carlo Acutis: Roadmap to Reality is a 2025 documentary film directed by Tim Moriarty and Christian Surtz about Saint Carlo Acutis, a 15-year-old Italian boy who died of leukemia. The movie released on April 27, 2025 to theaters nationwide.
