= Frassati Catholic High School =

Private coeducational school in Spring, Texas, United States

Location
- 22151 Frassati Way; Spring, (Harris County), Texas 77389; United States; 30°5′11″N 95°29′29″W

Information
- Type: Private, Coeducational
- Motto: Verso l'alto ("To the heights") (To the heights)
- Religious affiliation: Roman Catholic
- Patron saint: St. Pier Giorgio Frassati
- Established: 2013
- Oversight: Dominican Sisters of St. Cecilia
- Principal: Sister John Paul, O.P.
- Grades: 9–12
- Classes offered: College Prep; Honors and AP
- Campus size: 63 acres
- Campus type: Collegiate, multiple buildings
- Colors: Royal blue and Grey
- Athletics conference: TAPPS
- Mascot: Falcons
- Team name: Falcons
- Accreditation: Texas Catholic Conference Education Department
- Newspaper: La Stampa
- Graduates: 89
- Admissions Director: Mr. Tim Lienhard
- Website: www.frassaticatholic.org

Frassati Catholic High School is a private, Catholic coeducational secondary school located in unincorporated Harris County, Texas, near the Spring CDP and in Greater Houston. Frassati Catholic High School is administered by the Dominican Sisters of St. Cecilia Congregation from Nashville, Tennessee. The patron saint of this school is St. Pier Giorgio Frassati. It was the first Catholic high school to be established in the northern portion of Greater Houston.

== History ==
Prior to the opening of the school, residents of the northern parts of Greater Houston wishing to attend Catholic school had to drive long distances to Houston's Catholic high schools; the nearest such school was 45 minutes away by car. Individuals and/or organizations began attempting to establish a northside Catholic high school in the 1990s.

The North Houston Catholic High School Committee formed in 2007 in order to establish a Catholic high school serving northern portions of Greater Houston. Members of the committee's board of directors included members of Catholic churches in Harris County and southern Montgomery County. In 2008 it wrote a feasibility plan, and then wrote or obtained the curriculum, architectural design, and budget; Cardinal Daniel DiNardo gave his approval to these plans in October 2008. In 2009 the committee received a status as a nonprofit organization and acquired the land, spending $2 million, in December of that year. In 2010 the Dominican Sisters of St. Cecilia agreed to operate the school.

In July 2011, DiNardo announced that the new high school would be named after St. Pier Giorgio Frassati, Man of the Beatitudes. As of 2012 the school administration planned to spend a total of $70 million on the facility. About $25–35 million was to be spent on the facility's first phase, with $10 million for the initial structure and an additional $15–25 million for the remainder. The members of the student committee Friends of Frassati campaigned for candidates for the mascots at area middle schools and during a field day event held at the Creekside YMCA. 100 potential mascots were in consideration. The mascot, the falcons, was selected in an online poll held on Friday November 16, 2012; 461 persons voted.

On August 25, 2012 groundbreaking on the first portion occurred. For its faculty it was initially scheduled to have three sisters as well as three other faculty. Frassati Catholic High School opened in 2013 to an initial freshman (9th grade) class. In 2014 the school had 72 students; this increased to 94 in early 2015, 160 later in 2015 and 230 in 2016.

By October 2014 the school established a capital campaign to secure funding for campus additions. Groundbreaking of Phase 1B occurred on October 28, 2014 with construction expected to be completed in the fall of 2015. In 2015, the school welcomed its third class of freshmen, doubling the student population.

== Operations ==
The region in which the school planned to draw its students is the area south of Conroe, west of Lake Houston, north of Beltway 8, and east of Texas State Highway 249. Communities within the area include Conroe, Cypress, Humble, Kingwood, Spring, Tomball, and The Woodlands. In October 2014 that area had six Catholic parish primary schools, one private Catholic elementary school, and twelve Catholic parishes.

== Campus ==
The campus is on a 63-acre (25 ha) plot of land along Spring Stuebner Road, about 3 miles (4.8 km) west of Interstate 45.

The capacity of this first phase was to be 130 students. The first building, which was to have a stone façade, has twelve classrooms and two science laboratories, and it was scheduled to include a chapel, library, and commons. The total area of Phase 1A is 21,580 square feet (2,005 m^{2}) of space. The uppermost floor was to be decorated with glass. The administration believed the facilities would be sufficient for the first two years of the school's life.

Phase 1B had two components: additional classroom space, and a 54,000-square-foot (5,000 m^{2}) student life building; the latter includes a gymnasium, a 400-600-person assembly hall, a concession stand, a fine/performing/visual arts area, locker rooms, offices for coaching staff, a team meeting room, a training room, and a weight room. The gymnasium can be used as a 1,000-seat competition gymnasium, and it has two courts for basketball and volleyball matches. Games and practices may be held at the same time in the gymnasium. The assembly hall may be used for fine arts performances. The center opened on May 2, 2016 during a mass held by Cardinal DiNardo.

Phase 1B's second academic building is a mirror image of the inaugural Phase 1A building. The gymnasium and fine arts building was completed in March 2016.

== Curriculum ==
Frassati Catholic High School has an ethics and culture curriculum. Over their four years, students at Frassati Catholic take courses on Catholic philosophy (in the Dominican and Thomistic tradition), ethics, and bioethics. Seniors finish their requirements in the department by taking an Ethics & Culture Seminar.

== Sports ==
Frassati Catholic High School offers several sports including volleyball, cross country, soccer, flag football (a transitional program that led up to the school's first year of tackle football, which began in the 2016-2017 school year), swimming, boys and girls basketball, tennis, baseball, golf, and track & field. The school will add additional sports as it grows based on student interest. Almost 80% of Frassati Catholic's student body participates in athletics.

The Frassati Catholic Boys Soccer Team made it to the TAPPS 5A Playoffs for the first time in school history during the 2019-20 season. They would win their first playoff game on February 5, 2020 against Holy Cross of San Antonio by a score of 3-0, but would lose in the next round against Lutheran South.

== See also ==
- St. Pier Giorgio Frassati
- Dominican Sisters of St. Cecilia
