= Leo XIII Institute, Milan =

Leone XIII Institute, Milan
- Italian: Istituto Leone XIII

Location
- Milan; Italy
- Coordinates: 45°28′26.34″N 9°9′45.53″E

Information
- Type: Private primary, secondary, grammar, sport and science, and science high school
- Religious affiliation: Catholicism
- Denomination: Jesuits
- Patron saint: Pope Leo XIII
- Established: 1893; 133 years ago
- Dean: Vincenzo Sibillo
- Grades: K-12
- Website: www.leonexiii.it

Leone XIII Institute, Milan (Italian: Istituto Leone XIII), is a private Catholic primary, secondary, grammar, sport and science, and science high school, located in Milan, Italy. The school was founded by the Jesuits in 1893.

== Overview ==
The coat of arms of the school includes the IHS of the Society of Jesus, the cross of St. George which symbolizes the city of Milan, and the seal of Pope Leo XIII of the noble Sienese family of Pecci.

The current dean is Gabriella Tona, the first woman and the first lay person to perform this task in Italy.

The school is best known internationally for being the alma mater for Carlo Acutis, who was canonized as a saint by Pope Leo XIV on 7 September 2025. The naming similarity between the school and the pope was noted by Fr. David Michael Moses.

== Controversy ==
In 2008, actor Luca Barbareschi alleged that he was sexually abused by a priest while he was a student at the Institute in the 1960s. According to Barbareschi, the events took place from when he was from the ages of eight to thirteen.

== Notable alumni ==
- Carlo Acutis (1991–2006), canonized saint
- Gabriele Albertini (born 1950), politician
- Luca Barbareschi (born 1956), actor, filmmaker, and politician
- Luigi Caccia Dominioni (1913–2016), architect and furniture designer
- Piero Manzoni (1933–1963), artist
- Cesare Merzagora (1898–1991), politician
- Mario Monti (born 1943), Prime Minister of Italy from 2011 to 2013
- Massimo Moratti (born 1945), billionaire petroleum businessman
- Guido Morselli (1912–1973), novelist and essayist
- Maurizio Mosca (1940–2010), sports journalist and TV presenter
- Gabriele Salvatores (born 1950), Academy Award-winning filmmaker and director

== See also ==
- Education in Milan
