= Our Lady of Dolours, Chelsea =

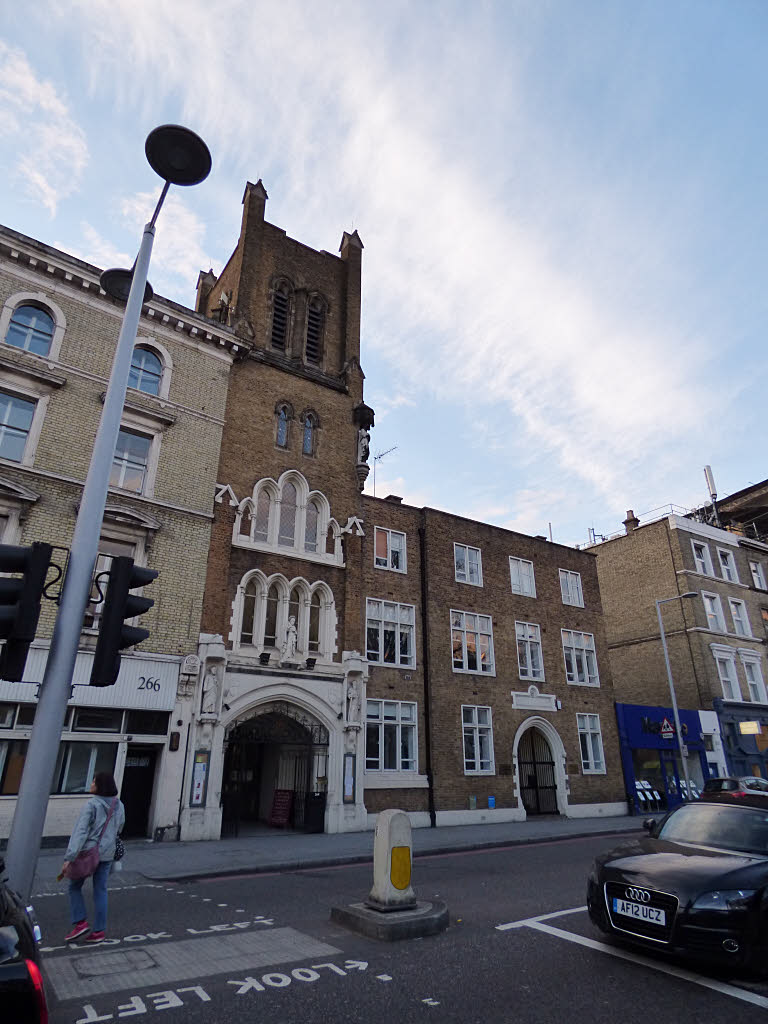
- Our Lady of Dolours, Chelsea
- 51.4848°N 0.1846°W
- Location: 264 Fulham Road, Chelsea, London SW10
- Country: England
- Denomination: Roman Catholic
- Religious order: Servite Order
- Website: serviteparish.co.uk

History
- Former name: Our Lady of Seven Dolours
- Status: Active
- Founded: 1873
- Founder(s): Father Philip Bosio OSM, Father Agostino Morini OSM
- Dedication: Our Lady of Dolours
- Consecrated: 1953

Architecture
- Functional status: Parish Church
- Heritage designation: Grade II
- Designated: 1984
- Architect: J. A. Hansom
- Architectural type: ecclesiastical
- Style: Gothic Revival
- Groundbreaking: 1873
- Completed: 1874

Administration
- Archdiocese: Westminster
- Deanery: Kensington & Chelsea deanery

Clergy
- Archbishop: Richard Moth

Our Lady of Dolours, also known as the Servite Church, is a Roman Catholic parish church run by the Servite Order in Chelsea, west London. The building was designed in Gothic Revival style by J. A. Hansom in 1873. It is Grade II listed with Historic England. It stands next to St Mary's Priory, at 264 Fulham Road close to the South Lodge entrance to Brompton Cemetery in the Royal Borough of Kensington and Chelsea. There is a mixed Roman Catholic primary school adjacent to the church and priory.

== History ==
The parish and its church were initiated by two Italian Servite priests from Florence, Fr Philip Bosio OSM and Fr Augustine Morini OSM, who arrived in London in 1864. They came as missionary members of an ancient mendicant order to fill the shortage of Catholic priests in the wake of the English resumption of regular, public Catholic services after a break of nearly 250 years. From 1852 to 1869 St Mary's Church, Moorfields, built by the faithful, served as the first London diocesan seat of a re-established British Catholic church with a hierarchy.

Construction on the Fulham Road site began in 1874, led by Fr Philip Bosio OSM, with Joseph Hansom as architect. Hansom also designed the tower and priory frontage on Fulham Road (1879–80). It was originally named Our Lady of the Seven Dolours, but this was later simplified to the present dedication, (which is equivalent in meaning to Our Lady of Sorrows). The church was opened by Cardinal Manning on 19 September 1875. Consecration came later, on 4 November 1953, as churches were only formally consecrated when their debts were repaid.

From its beginning, when Roman Catholic parishes were being organised in the areas of Brompton, Fulham and Chelsea, the Servite Church was the most popular with the faithful, of whom crowds attended its services.

The entrance colonnade passage by Hansom (1894) is unique in English churches. Other features include bronzes of the Redeemer and St. Peter by Mayer (1872), The Holy Face, after Lorenzo di Credi, 1895 and J. M. Swynnerton's Pietà (1896). The magnificent Gothic Reredos were unaccountably removed during a 1970s refurbishment. The organ is by Henry Jones, built by Grant, Degens and Bradbeer in 1968.

The church serves native residents as well as an international community of Catholics who live in the area. One transient Italian family had their first-born baptised at the church on 18 May 1991, before returning to their homeland in September of that year. The baby, Carlo Acutis, whose life was cut short by leukemia at the age of 15, was beatified in Assisi Cathedral on 10 October 2020. He was canonised on 7 September 2025. One of his hairs is held in the church in a relic-holder in a shrine converted from a former confessional box, near the font where he was baptised.

The church was made a grade II listed building in November 1984.

== See also ==
- Mary Remnant
