= Vittoria Assicurazioni =

Italian company active in the insurance sector

Vittoria Assicurazioni S.p.A.
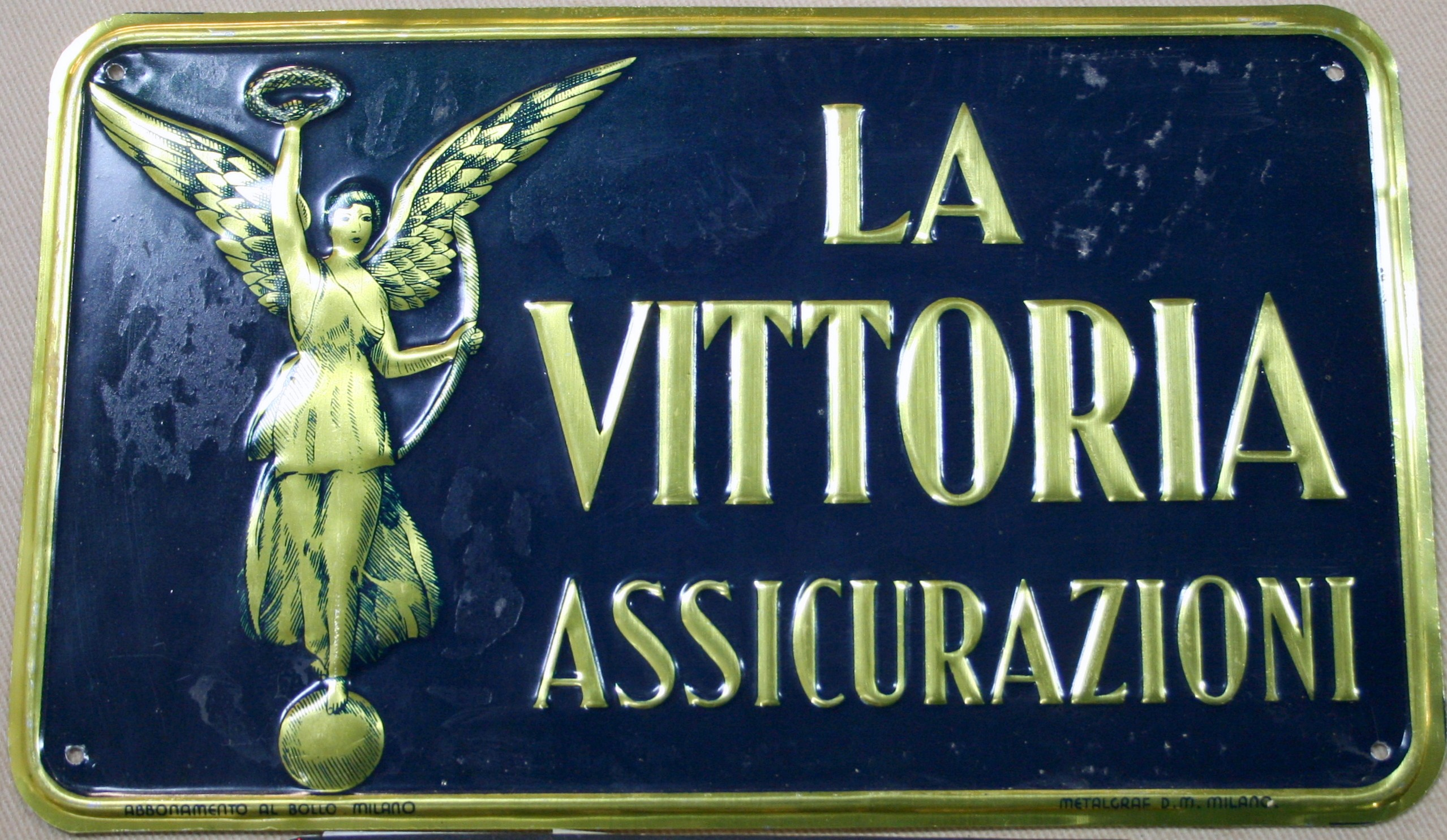

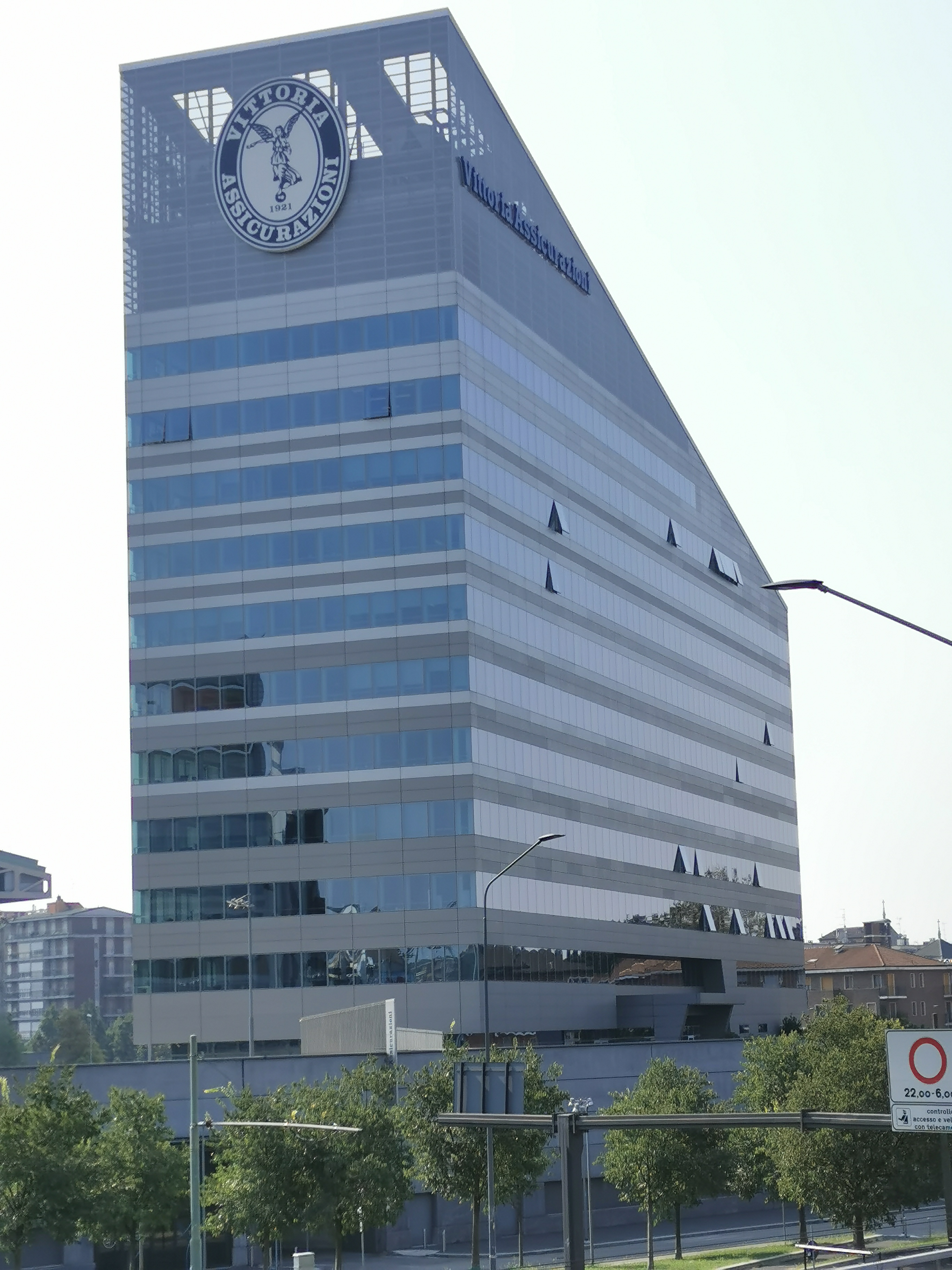
- Vittoria Assicurazioni headquarters in the Portello district of Milan.
- Type: Public
- Traded as: BIT: VAS
- ISIN: IT0000062882
- Industry: Insurance
- Founded: 1921; 105 years ago
- Headquarters: Portello, Milan, Italy
- Area served: Italy
- Key people: Andrea Acutis (chairman); Cesare Caldarelli (CEO)
- Products: Insurance
- Owner: Acutis family
- Parent: Yafa
- Website: www.vittoriaassicurazioni.com

Vittoria Assicurazioni is an Italian company active in the insurance sector.

Founded in 1921, it has been listed on the Milan Stock Exchange since 1988.

== History ==
It was founded in Cremona in 1921 as the Italian Excess Insurance Company. In 1936 it became La Vittoria Assicurazioni and moved to Milan, with headquarters in Piazza San Babila.

In 1959, it was authorized to operate in the life insurance branch; in 1968, it took on its current name and in 1988 it began to be listed on the Milan Stock Exchange.

From 1932 to 1986, it was part of Toro Assicurazioni, a company controlled for a long time by members of the upper middle class families of Turin and ended up in 1976 under the Banco Ambrosiano of Roberto Calvi, to then be taken over in 1983 by IFIL degli Agnelli thanks to the initiative of Carlo Acutis (father of the current president of the company Andrea Acutis and paternal grandfather of the Saint Catholic Carlo Acutis), who had been CEO of Toro since 1969.

In 1986, Vittoria Assicurazioni came under the control of the Acutis family. In 1999 it obtained the authorization for pension funds.
