= Luciana Frassati Gawronska =

Italian writer (1902–2007)

- Luciana Frassati Gawronska
- Born: 18 August 1902; Pollone, Italy
- Died: 7 October 2007 (aged 105); Pollone, Italy
- Occupation: Writer
- Children: 6, including Jas
- Parent(s): Adélaïde Ametis; Alfredo Frassati
- Relatives: Pier Giorgio Frassati (brother)

Luciana Frassati Gawronska (18 August 1902 – 7 October 2007) was an Italian writer and author. Gawronska was a prominent anti-Nazi and anti-fascist activist in both Poland and Italy and was considered a champion of Catholic causes.

== Early life ==
Luciana Frassati was born on 18 August 1902 in Pollone, Italy, near the municipality of Biella. Her father, Alfredo Frassati, was the founder of the Turin-based newspaper, La Stampa, a well-known daily newspaper. Her mother, Adélaïde Ametis, was a notable painter.

Frassati's older brother was Pier Giorgio Frassati, who died of polio in 1925. Her brother was formally beatified as "Blessed Pier Giorgio Frassati" by Pope John Paul II on 20 May 1990, and canonized by Pope Leo XIV on 7 September 2025.

== Education and marriage ==
Frassati Gawronska later wrote a first-hand account of her brother's life, A Man of the Beatitudes. She campaigned throughout her life in the effort to elevate her brother to canonization as a saint.

She earned a law degree from the University of Turin and married Jan Gawronski (né Gawroński) in the spring of 1925. He was a diplomat and secretary to the Polish ambassador to Italy and the Vatican at the time. Gawroński later served as the last Polish ambassador to Austria before the country's annexation by Nazi Germany in 1938.

The couple had six children: Jas, Alfredo, Wanda, Giovanna, Maria Grazia and Nella. Their son, Jas Gawronski, became an Italian journalist and politician. He has served as a Member of the European Parliament.

== World War II ==
Frassati Gawronska lived in a number of European countries with her husband, including Germany, Turkey, and Poland. The couple moved to Austria in 1933, just as Adolf Hitler was taking power in neighboring Germany. Jan Gawronski served as the last ambassador of Poland to Austria before Austria's annexation by Nazi Germany in the 1938 Anschluss.

Frassati Gawronska and her family moved to Warsaw, Poland, after the annexation of Austria. They lived in the city until the invasion and fall of Poland to the Germans in 1939. The Germans immediately began to round up Polish officials, intellectuals, and others. Frassati's Italian citizenship (Italy was then ruled by Benito Mussolini, an ally of Hitler), and her relationship with prominent figures throughout Europe, afforded the family some protection from the Nazis.

Frassati Gawronska acted to help Poland during World War II. With her Italian passport, which allowed her to move freely between Poland and Italy, she made seven separate trips throughout Europe's German Nazi-held territories during the war, including to Warsaw, Kraków, Berlin and Rome. She managed to smuggle rescued artwork and documents linking the Nazis to atrocities out of Poland at great personal risk. She also distributed money to the Polish resistance.

She also rescued and moved Polish families out of the country. Many, including entire families, were sent to relative safety in Italy. Among those she rescued were Olga Helena Zubrzewska, wife of General Władysław Sikorski, a major political figure and one of the leaders of the Polish resistance. Through her influence, Frassati Gawronska also secured the release of more than one hundred professors of the University of Krakow.

== Honors ==
Luciana Frassati Gawronska received the Order of Merit of the Republic of Poland from the Polish government in 1993 for her service to the country. She was named an admired woman of Poland in the 1 March 2003 issue of Wysokie Obcasy, joining other Polish and international figures.

== Death ==
Frassati Gawronska died on 7 October 2007, at the age of 105, at her home in Pollone, Italy. Her funeral was held on 9 October 2007 at Turin Cathedral. She was buried in her family's tomb.

Her space was once occupied by the coffin of her brother, Pier Giorgio Frassati, who died young. Because of his efforts on behalf of the poor, his remains had been moved to Turin Cathedral. He was canonized as a saint by Pope Leo XIV in 2025.
