= Jas Gawronski =

Italian journalist and politician (born 1936)

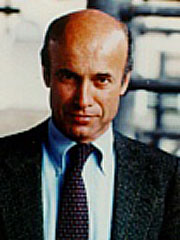

Member of the Senate of the Republic
- In office 9 May 1996 – 18 December 1999

Member of the European Parliament
- In office 10 June 1979 – 12 June 1994
- In office 13 June 1999 – 7 June 2009

Personal details
- Born: 7 February 1936 (age 90) Vienna, Austria
- Party: PRI (until 1994); FI (1994–2009)
- Education: Sapienza University of Rome
- Occupation: Journalist, politician

Jas Gawronski (born 7 February 1936) is an Italian journalist and politician. He was a member of the European Parliament for North-West with Forza Italia, member of the Bureau of the European People's Party, and sits on the European Parliament's Committee on Foreign Affairs.

== Biography ==
A member of the Polish nobility, he is the grandson of Stanisław Gawroński, Rawicz coat of arms (1860-1942) and his wife, Princess Helena Lubomirska (1870-1950). Gawronski, who speaks Polish fluently, was born in Vienna, the son of a Polish ambassador, Jan Gawroński, and the Italian writer Luciana Frassati. He is the nephew of St. Pier Giorgio Frassati, canonized a saint by the Catholic Church in 2025. He was correspondent for RAI (Italian State television) from New York, Paris, Moscow and Warsaw, and later hosted some political shows for Silvio Berlusconi's Mediaset network. He collaborated with the newspapers Il Giorno and La Stampa. From 1981 to 1994 he was a member of the European Parliament for the Italian Republican Party. He later switched to Berlusconi's Forza Italia, for which he was elected to the Italian Senate in 1996–99.

Gawronski is a substitute for the Committee on International Trade, a member of the Delegation for Relations with the countries of Southeast Asia and the Association of Southeast Asian Nations (ASEAN) and a substitute for the Delegation for Relations with the Korean Peninsula.
