= Sant'Ambrogio ad Nemus, Milan =

Church in Milan, Italy

Coordinates: 45°28′41″N 9°10′18″E

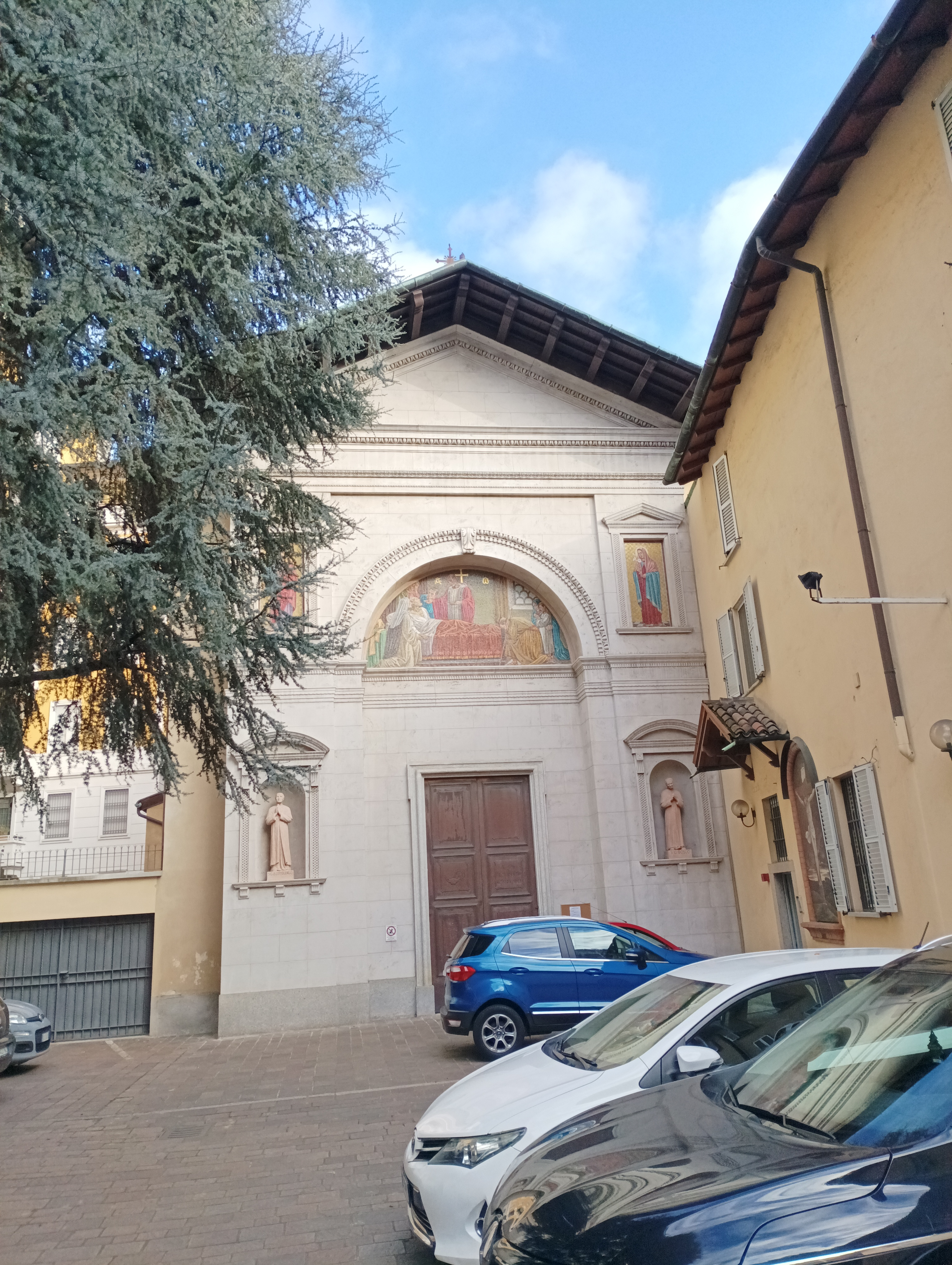
The church

Sant'Ambrogio ad Nemus (Sant Ambrosin in Lombard language) is a Baroque style, Roman Catholic convent in Milan, Italy. The convent is no longer functioning, but the oratory or church remains.

While the present church dates to a reconstruction begun in 1635, the site was associated with the founding of monasticism by Saint Ambrose. The term ad Nemus referred to a forest outside of the medieval walls. The walls were frescoed in the 17th century. Above the entrance of the church are frescoes by the painter Cocchi.
