= The Catholic Review =

- Type: Biweekly newspaper
- Owner: Cathedral Foundation
- Founded: 1913; 113 years ago
- Language: English
- City: Baltimore, Maryland
- Country: United States
- OCLC number: 9395557
- Website: catholicreview.org

The Catholic Review is Maryland's largest paid weekly newspaper distributed by mail. The Review covers national and international news of interest to Catholics and serves as the newspaper of record for the archdiocese of Baltimore.

== History ==
The Review is the successor to the original diocesan newspaper The Catholic Mirror (founded in 1833) which was published until 1908. After an interval of five and a half years, under James Cardinal Gibbons, then Archbishop of Baltimore, the Baltimore Catholic Review was initiated and later renamed with the shorter title of The Catholic Review.

In 2012, with circulation down to 50,000, the Review switched from a weekly to a biweekly publication schedule for the print edition.

In 2002, the publishing office of the Review was set up separately from the Archbishop's Office and the Archdiocese itself as the Cathedral Foundation and moved six blocks north from the Catholic Center/ Archdiocese Building at the southwest corner of Cathedral Street and West Mulberry Street, across from the historic Basilica of the National Shrine of the Assumption of the Blessed Virgin Mary (the old Baltimore Cathedral and Basilica) on Cathedral Hill to 880 Park Avenue, in the surrounding Mount Vernon-Belvedere neighborhood.
