= Canonization of Carlo Acutis and Pier Giorgio Frassati =

2025 Roman Catholic ceremony declaring saints

Saints Canonization of Carlo Acutis and Pier Giorgio Frassati
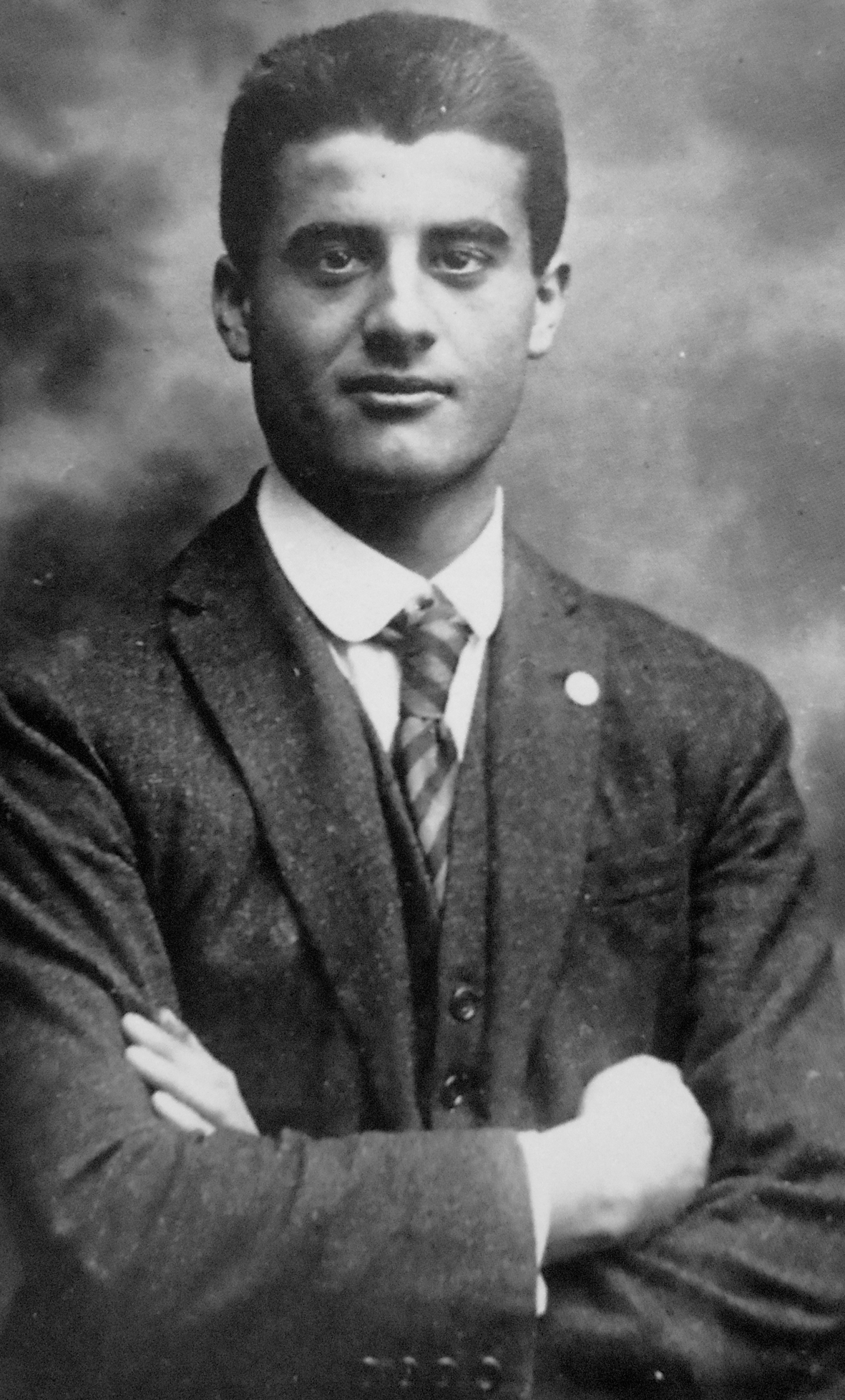
- Respectively from left to right: Carlo Acutis and Pier Giorgio Frassati
- Born: Carlo Acutis: 3 May 1991 London, England; Pier Giorgio Frassati: 6 April 1901 Turin, Kingdom of Italy
- Died: Carlo Acutis: 12 October 2006 Monza, Italy; Pier Giorgio Frassati: 4 July 1925 Turin, Kingdom of Italy
- Venerated in: Carlo Acutis and Pier Giorgio Frassati: Catholic Church

On 7 September 2025, two blessed candidates, Carlo Acutis (3 May 1991 – 12 October 2006) and Pier Giorgio Frassati (6 April 1901 – 4 July 1925), were both canonized in the Vatican City by Pope Leo XIV, who had begun his papacy on 8 May 2025.

Pope Francis had planned to canonize Carlo Acutis as the first millennial saint on 27 April, and Pier Giorgio Frassati at the end of August. However, Pope Francis died on 21 April, so the canonization was postponed. Following Pope Francis's death and the election of Pope Leo XIV, the date of the canonization was set on 13 June at the Apostolic Palace. The canonization drew over 80,000 people that gathered in St. Peter's Square.

Pope Leo XIV decreed that both Carlo Acutis and Pier Giorgio Frassati would be inscribed in the Register of Saints, along with Blessed Ignazio Choukrallah Maloyan, Peter To Rot, Vincenza Maria Poloni, Maria del Monte Carmelo Rendiles Martinez, José Gregorio Hernández Cisneros and Bartolo Longo, who would be canonized on 19 October.

== Canonization ==
On 13 June, Leo XIV held the first Ordinary Public Consistory of his pontificate. Then, the cardinals gave their formal approval of the canonizations of eight blesseds. The crowds, who were attending the canonization, were surprised by the presence of Leo XIV as he emerged from St. Peter's Basilica before Mass to greet them. While greeting the crowds, Leo XIV told them that being "together" is a blessing for the Lord, Italy and the whole church. Then he welcomed the family of Acutis and relatives of Frassati, many Catholic Action members, and the group Frassati belonged to. In addition, the president of Italy Sergio Mattarella and other authorities were also present for the canonization. Leo XIV invited anyone to "follow their example and their love for Christ in the Eucharist and in the poor". Shortly after the greeting, Leo XIV then returned wearing gold vestments. He began the event with the sign of the cross. At the beginning of the canonization ceremony, the Sistine Choir were singing "Veni Creator", the hymn to the Holy Spirit. Stepping forward and formally requesting Leo XIV to formally declare Frassati and Acutis saints, Cardinal Marcello Semeraro read a short biography of each new saint.

In the presence of ten thousands of young people responding to the declaration of sainthood with applause and the Sistine Choir singing the triple "Amen" and the "Alleluia", the Scripture readings for Mass were read: Carlo Acutis's brother Michele read the first reading in English and the others in Italian, Latin and Greek following the canonization ceremony.
