= Pier Giorgio Frassati =

Italian Catholic activist and saint (1901–1925)

Saint Pier Giorgio Frassati TOP
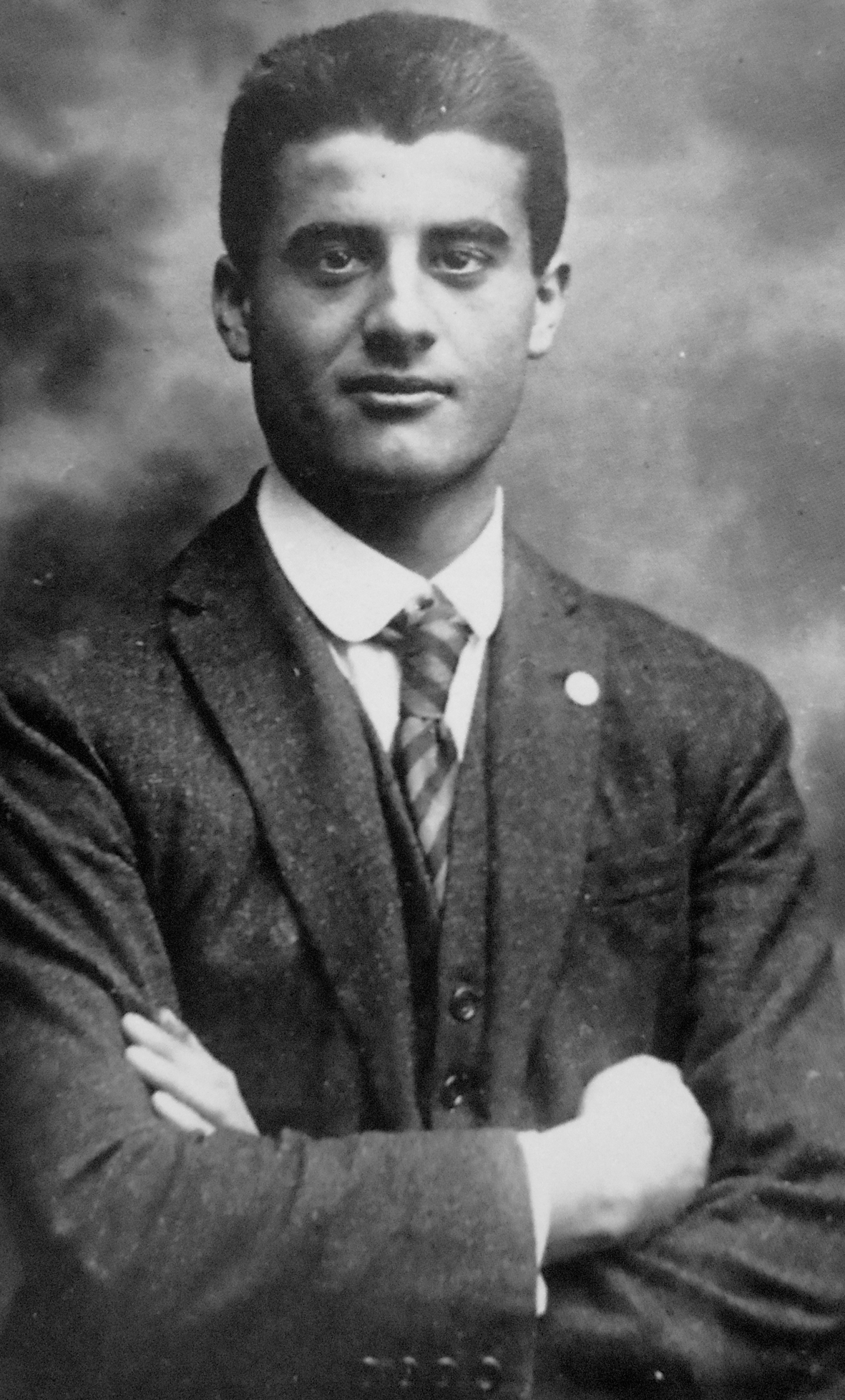

Confessor
- Born: 6 April 1901; Turin, Kingdom of Italy
- Died: 4 July 1925 (aged 24); Turin, Kingdom of Italy
- Cause of death: Polio
- Venerated in: Catholic Church
- Beatified: 20 May 1990, Saint Peter's Square by Pope John Paul II
- Canonized: 7 September 2025, Saint Peter's Square by Pope Leo XIV
- Major shrine: Cathedral of Saint John the Baptist, Turin, Italy
- Feast: 4 July
- Patronage: Mountaineers; Students; Catholic youth; Youth groups; Catholic Action; Dominican tertiaries; World Youth Day

Pier Giorgio Frassati TOP (6 April 1901 – 4 July 1925) was an Italian Catholic activist and a member of the Third Order of Saint Dominic. He was dedicated to social justice issues and joined several charitable organizations, including Catholic Action and the Society of Saint Vincent de Paul, to better aid the poor and less fortunate living in his hometown of Turin.

Frassati's cause for canonization opened in 1932 after the Turin poor made several pleas for such a cause to open. Pope Pius XII suspended the cause in 1941 due to a range of allegations later proven to be false, which allowed for the cause to resume. Pope John Paul II beatified Frassati in May 1990 and dubbed him the "Man of the Eight Beatitudes". On 7 September 2025, Frassati was canonized along with Carlo Acutis by Pope Leo XIV.

Frassati was known for his motto, "verso l'alto."

== Life ==
Pier Giorgio Frassati was born on 6 April 1901 – Holy Saturday – toAlfredo Frassati, an agnostic who owned the liberal newspaper La Stampa, and Adélaïde Ametis, who was a painter. His only sibling – a sister – was Luciana Frassati Gawronska (18 August 1902 – 7 October 2007). His father was active in national politics and served in the Italian Senate. He was later appointed as Italian ambassador to Germany. His parents had married on 5 September 1898. His artist mother had works exhibited at an event in Venice that saw King Victor Emmanuel III purchase some of her works. His paternal grandparents were Pietro Frassati and Giuseppina Coda Canati.

Frassati's inclinations to help others manifested in his childhood. There was one occasion as a child when he answered the door to find a mother begging with her son, who was shoeless. His response was to take off his shoes and give them to the child. In 1909, his father refused to help a man who came to their door because he was drunk. The sobbing Frassati told his mother of this and she instructed him to find the man and bring him to the home for something to eat. His first confession was heard at the church of Corpus Christi on 20 June 1910, and he received his First Communion on 19 June 1911; he received his Confirmation in his parish church on 10 June 1915.

Frassati was an average student in school, though he was known among his peers for his intelligence and his devotion. He failed his exams in 1913 and so was sent for private studies at a school run by the Jesuits.

Frassati was dedicated to works of social action that would unite people together in fellowship as a means of combating inequalities. He was an opponent of fascism and did not support the regime of Benito Mussolini. In addition to opposing Benito Mussolini's regime and fascism, Frassati was against communism as well. He was once arrested in Rome while protesting alongside the 1921 Young Catholic Workers Congress. He was involved with student groups as well as the Apostleship of Prayer and Catholic Action (joined in 1919) to which he dedicated himself.

Frassati also became a professed member of the Third Order of Saint Dominic on 28 May 1922 to imitate the example of Dominic of Osma, assuming the religious name of "Girolamo" in honour of Girolamo Savonarola. He often said: "Charity is not enough; we need social reform". He helped establish a newspaper entitled Momento whose principles were based on Pope Leo XIII's Rerum novarum. He joined a Saint Vincent de Paul conference in 1918 and spent much of his time helping the poor and less fortunate. In 1918, he began his studies in engineering so he could become a mining engineer. He wanted to do this in order "to serve Christ better among the miners". Upon his graduation, his father offered him either a car or a sizable fund. He chose the latter so he could give it to the poor rather than using it for himself. He also provided a bed for a tuberculosis sufferer on one occasion, as well as supporting the three children of an ill widow and finding a place for an evicted woman. During the course of his studies, he found himself attracted to a girl due to her candour and goodness, which impressed him. He never dated her since he was apprehensive about whether or not his parents would approve of her. This prompted him to renounce undertaking a relationship, as he confided to his sister.

Frassati was an avid mountaineer and athlete who could swim well. He was a member of the Club Alpino Italiano and climbed mountains such as the Grand Tournalin and Monte Viso.

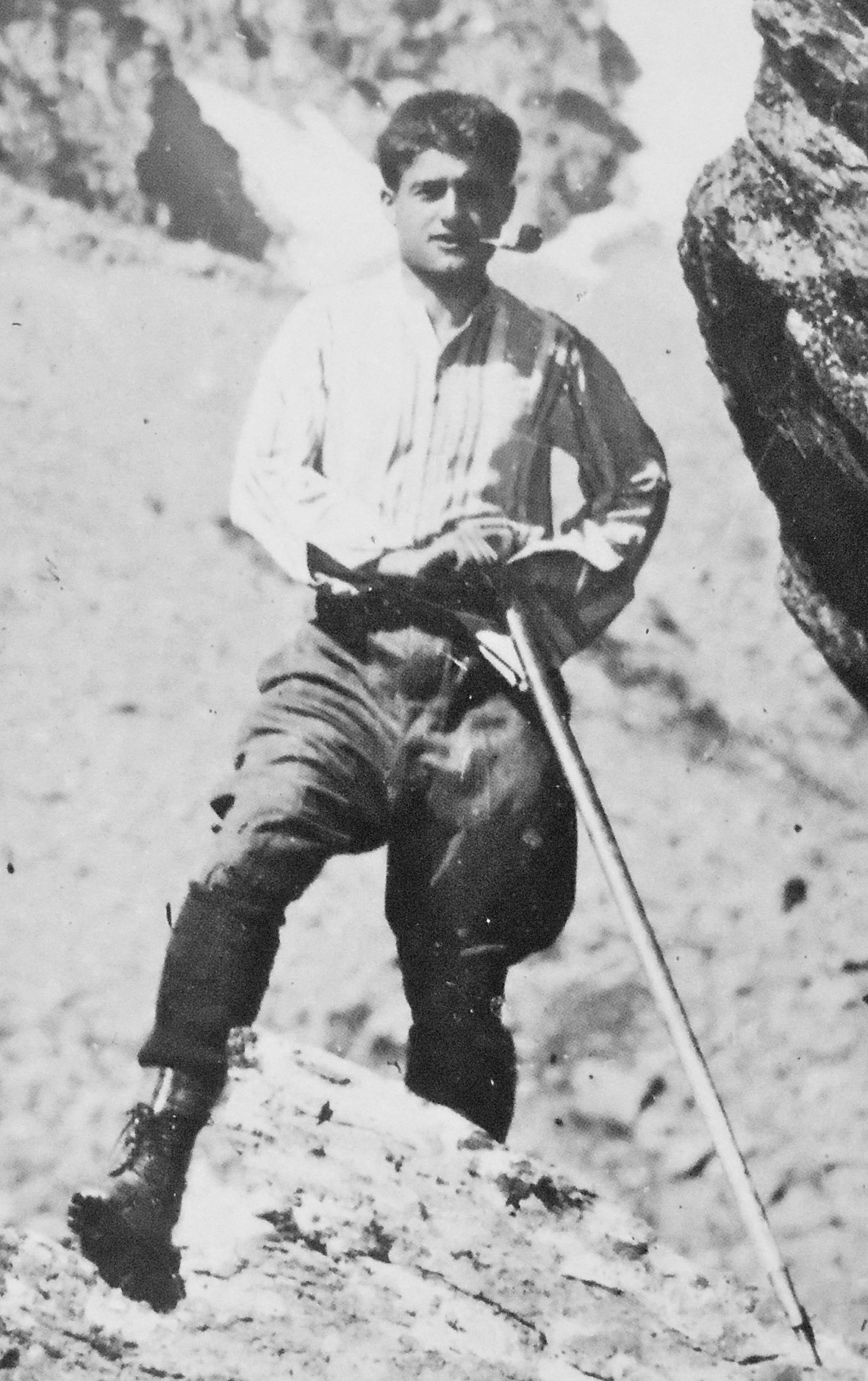
Frassati mountaineering

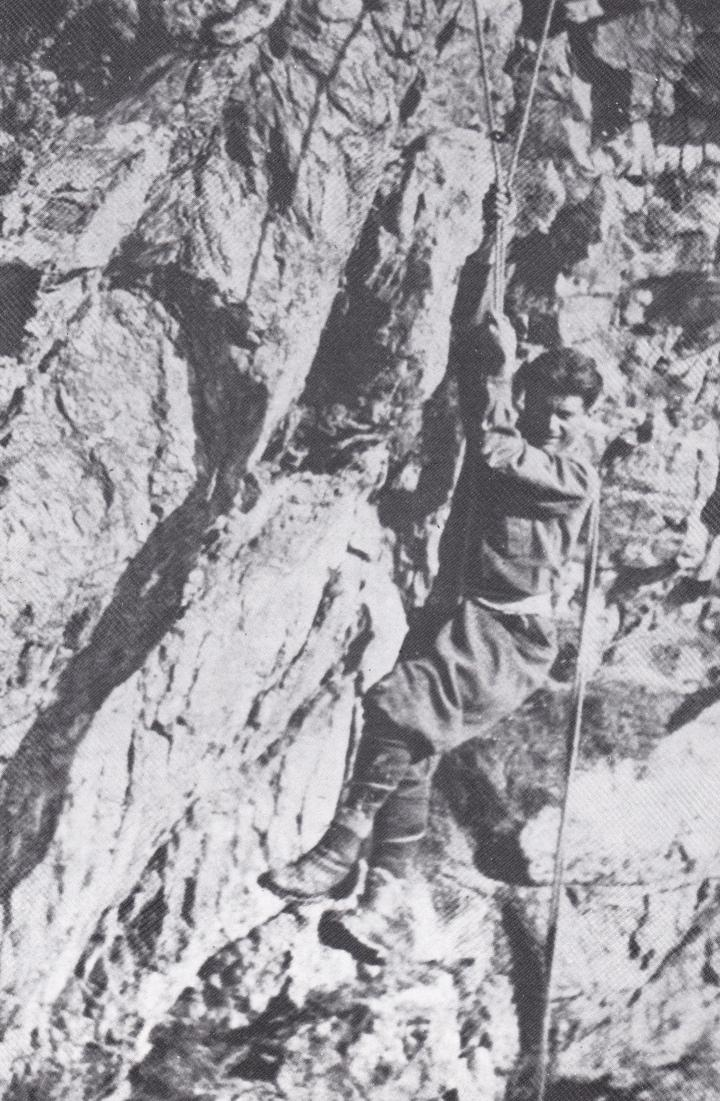
Frassati climbing at Rocca Sella (1924)

On 30 June 1925, while boating with two friends on the Po River, Frassati began to complain of sharp pains in his back muscles. On 1 July, he returned home with a severe headache and a fever. That same day, his maternal grandmother died. Because of his sincere humility, he deflected attention from himself, preferring that his family mourn for his grandmother. On 2 July, a doctor was summoned and asked the prone Frassati to get up from lying down. Frassati replied: "I can't!" Soon he was diagnosed with poliomyelitis, which exacerbated his fatigue. Frassati asked for a morphine shot so he could sleep more easily; however, the doctor and his mother believed the shot to be imprudent, and Frassati relented.

As Frassati's condition worsened, and it became apparent that he would soon die, he gave his final instructions to his sister. His condition declined by 3:00 am on 4 July, and a priest was summoned to give him the Last Rites. He was near death at 4:00 pm, with his mother holding him in her arms. His final words were: "May I breathe forth my soul in peace with you".

Frassati died at 7:00 pm on 4 July 1925 due to polio.

His parents had expected their circle of elite and political figures to attend the funeral, as well as many of his friends. Yet all were surprised to find the streets lined with thousands of mourners as the cortege passed. He was revered among the many people he had helped. He was buried in the Frassati plot at the Pollone Cemetery.

His remains were later transferred to Turin Cathedral in 1981. Upon later inspection, they were found to be incorrupt.

== Beatification ==
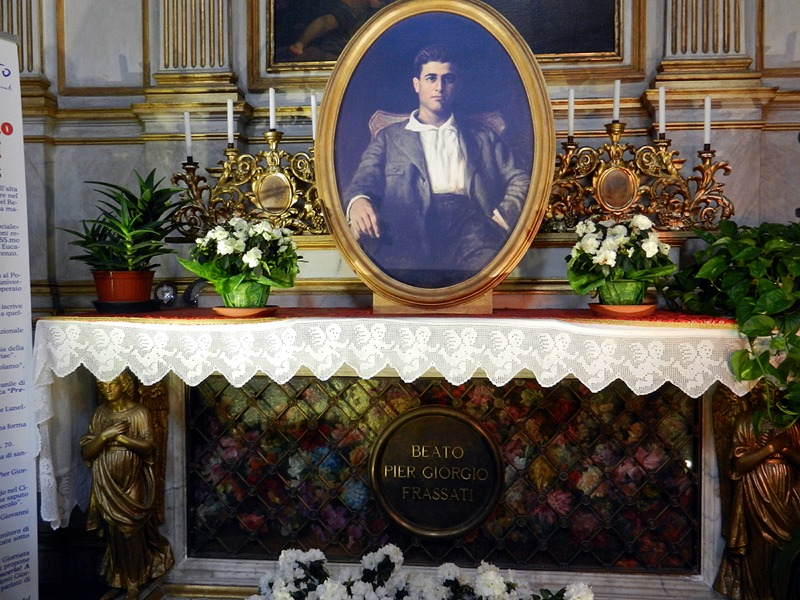
Frassati's resting place in Turin Cathedral

The poor of Turin began to petition the Archbishop of Turin to open proceedings for the cause for Frassati's canonization. The cause commenced on 2 July 1932 for a thorough examination of Frassati's life in an informative process that later concluded on 23 October 1935 after collecting a range of documentation and witness testimonies (Cardinal Maurilio Fossati oversaw this process in his role as archbishop). Frassati's writings were also collected for examination to ensure no doctrinal breaches were present, since that would impede the cause to a significant degree; theologians cleared them on 21 December 1938.

In 1941, Pope Pius XII suspended the cause upon the airing of allegations questioning Frassati's morals and claiming that Frassati went to the mountains in mixed and questionable company. His sister—sometime after this—went to Rome to discuss this with Vatican officials to rehabilitate her brother's good name rather than to resume the cause. The allegations were proven false, and Vatican officials declared that the cause would resume. The formal introduction of the cause came under Pope Paul VI on 12 June 1978 and Frassati was titled a Servant of God. An apostolic process followed, concluding in 1981. The Congregation for the Causes of Saints issued a decree of validation on 12 June 1987 for the previous processes and received the Positio dossier from the postulation later in 1987. Theologians approved its contents on 14 July 1987, as did the members of the Roman Congregation for the Causes of the Saints on 28 September 1987. Frassati was proclaimed venerable on 23 October 1987 after Pope John Paul II authorized a decree confirming that Frassati had lived a model Christian life of heroic virtue.

A single miracle - often a healing that medicine and science cannot explain - was needed for his beatification. The miracle investigated was the cure in late 1933 of Domenico Sellan (1893 - c. 1968), who suffered from grave tuberculosis. A priest visited him on 28 December 1933 to bring him a relic and a picture of Frassati for his intercession. Sellan was healed of the disease and lived for over three more decades in perfect health. The closure of the miracle's investigation allowed for the Congregation for the Causes of Saints to validate the process in a 20 February 1989 decree before the approval of medical experts on 26 April 1989. Theologians also confirmed the healing was a miracle on 30 June 1989, as did the Congregation on 3 October 1989. Pope John Paul II granted final approval to the miracle on 21 December 1989. John Paul II beatified Frassati in Saint Peter's Square on 20 May 1990.

== Posthumous recognition ==
Frassati is the eponym and patron of the Frassati Catholic Academy in Wauconda which is a middle school founded in the Archdiocese of Chicago in 2010 and also the Frassati Catholic High School which opened in August 2013 in Houston. Blessed Pier Giorgio Frassati Catholic School was opened as part of the Toronto Catholic District School Board on 3 September 2013 in the Scarborough area of Toronto in Canada.

Pier Giorgio Frassati is the patron of Bishop McGuinness High School in Oklahoma, and the school awards the "Blessed Pier Giorgio Frassati Award" to its students who have performed a high level of service to others.

Frassati Australia - based in Brisbane - venerates Pier Giorgio Frassati as their patron and as a role model for adolescent men. Frassati Australia engages them in the Catholic faith and encourages them to encounter Christ through living an authentic Catholic life in brotherhood and through charitable outreach. At the present time, there are at least three Frassati Houses in Brisbane and around twelve men in these houses.

Christendom College in Front Royal, Virginia, a Roman Catholic liberal arts college, has hosted the Frassati Invitational rugby tournament annually since 2016.

On 22 March 2019, Auburn University's Catholic Ministry dedicated Blessed Pier Giorgio Frassati Chapel in Auburn, Alabama, with Archbishop Rodi of Mobile. The chapel allows for Auburn's college students the ability to pray there 24 hours a day and hosts Thursday evening mass there during the school year. The chapel also holds a relic of Blessed Frassati.

On 10 December 2021, the Pontifical and Royal University of Santo Tomas in Manila, Philippines inaugurated the Saint Pier Giorgio Frassati Building, which now houses the senior high school program of the university.

In March 2020, Bishop Robert E. Guglielmone gave the directive for a new Catholic community to be established in Carolina Forest, South Carolina, holding Sunday mass at the Saint Elizabeth Ann Seton Catholic School. The success and growth of this new group led Bishop Jacques Fabre-Jeune to give the official decree of establishing the new Parish of the Blessed Pier Giorgio Frassati on February 6, 2023. In September 2024, the parish purchased a tract of land around the Seton School to develop into a church and campus. Currently, the parish is fundraising and master planning the campus.

=== Papal recognition ===
In 1989, John Paul II visited his tomb and paid honour to him, calling him the "Man of the Eight Beatitudes". Pope Benedict XVI called upon adolescents in 2010 to follow the example of Frassati to "... discover that it is worth committing oneself to God ... to respond to His call in the fundamental decisions" throughout one's life.

Pope Francis venerated Frassati's remains in November 2015 while visiting Turin.

=== Relics ===
Frassati's remains have been moved from their resting place in Turin three times for World Youth Day, to Sydney in 2008, to Kraków in 2016 and to Rome in August 2025.

== Canonization ==
On 27 April 2024, Cardinal Marcello Semeraro, prefect of the Dicastery for the Causes of Saints, announced during the 18th National Assembly of Italian Catholic Action that the canonization of Frassati had been cleared. His canonization date was slated for sometime in 2025, a jubilee year. On 20 November 2024, it was announced that Frassati would be canonized during the Jubilee of Youth between 28 July and 3 August, with the canonization ceremonies set to occur on Sunday, 3 August. Instead, the canonization ceremony took place on 7 September 2025 under Pope Leo XIV, who canonized him along with Carlo Acutis.

== See also ==
- Luciana Frassati Gawronska – Pier Giorgio's sister
