= Olszanica =

Olszanica may refer to the following places in Poland:

- Olszanica, part of the Zwierzyniec district of Kraków
- Olszanica, Lower Silesian Voivodeship (south-west Poland)
- Olszanica, Podlaskie Voivodeship (north-east Poland)
- Olszanica, Pomeranian Voivodeship (north Poland)
- Olszanica, Subcarpathian Voivodeship (south-east Poland)
