= Konstantin Rokossovsky =

Soviet and Polish general (1896–1968)

Marshal of the Soviet Union Konstantin Rokossovsky
- Rokossovsky in 1945

Deputy Prime Minister of Poland
- In office 20 November 1952 – 18 March 1954
- Prime Minister: Bolesław Bierut; Józef Cyrankiewicz
- Preceded by: Zenon Nowak
- Succeeded by: Jakub Berman

Minister of National Defence of Poland
- In office 6 November 1949 – 13 November 1956
- Prime Minister: Józef Cyrankiewicz; Bolesław Bierut; Józef Cyrankiewicz
- Preceded by: Michał Rola-Żymierski
- Succeeded by: Marian Spychalski

Personal details
- Born: Konstantin Ksaveryevich Rokossovsky (Note: Polish: Konstanty Ksaweriewicz Rokossowski); 21 December 1896 Velikiye Luki, Russia or Warsaw, Congress Poland
- Died: 3 August 1968 (aged 71) Moscow, Soviet Union
- Resting place: Kremlin Wall Necropolis
- Awards: Hero of the Soviet Union (twice); Order of Victory; Several others (see below)
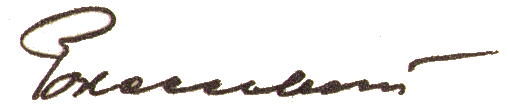
- Signature

Military service
- Allegiance: Russian Empire (1914–1917); Soviet Russia (1917–1922); Soviet Union (1922–1949, 1956–1962); Polish People's Republic (1949–1955)
- Branch/service: Red Army; Polish People's Army
- Years of service: 1914–1937, 1940–1962
- Rank: Marshal of the Soviet Union; Marshal of Poland
- Commands: 7th Samara Cavalry Division; 15th Cavalry Division; 5th Cavalry Corps; 9th Mechanized Corps; 4th Army "Group Yartsevo"; 16th Army; Bryansk Front; Don Front; Central Front; 1st Belorussian Front; 2nd Belorussian Front; Polish Armed Forces
- Battles/wars: World War I; Russian Civil War; Chinese Civil War; Sino-Soviet conflict (1929); World War II; Invasion of Bessarabia; Great Patriotic War; Battle of Brody; First Battle of Smolensk; Battle of Moscow; Battle of Stalingrad; Battle of Kursk; Operation Bagration; Bobruysk offensive; Minsk offensive; Lublin–Brest offensive; Vistula-Oder Offensive; Battle of Berlin; Soviet occupation of Poland

Konstantin Konstantinovich (Note: also Ksaveryevich) Rokossovsky (Note: In this name that follows East Slavic naming customs, the patronymic is Konstantinovich and the family name is Rokossovsky.) (Note: Russian: Константин Константинович (Ксаверьевич) Рокоссовский; Polish: Konstanty Rokossowski) (9 December [O.S. 21 December] 1896 – 3 August 1968) was a Soviet and Polish general who served as a top commander in the Red Army during World War II and achieved the ranks of Marshal of the Soviet Union and Marshal of Poland. He also served as Defence Minister of Poland from 1949 to 1956.

Rokossovsky was born to a Polish noble family in Warsaw in present-day Poland, then part of the Russian Empire, or according to other sources in Velikiye Luki in present-day Russia. He served in the Imperial Russian Army during World War I, and in 1918, joined the Red Army and fought with distinction during the Russian Civil War. Rokossovsky rose to hold senior Red Army commands by 1937, when he fell victim to Joseph Stalin's Great Purge and was branded a traitor, imprisoned and tortured. After Soviet failures in the Winter War, Rokossovsky was released from prison in 1940 and returned to command of an army corps.

Following Germany's invasion of the Soviet Union in June 1941, Rokossovsky played key roles in the Battle of Smolensk and defense of Moscow, where he led the 16th Army to victory. He was commander of the front that defeated the Axis at the Battle of Stalingrad in early 1943, and that summer played a vital role in the Battle of Kursk. In 1944, Rokossovsky was instrumental in planning and executing parts of Operation Bagration, and was promoted to Marshal of the Soviet Union that June. His 1st Belorussian Front reached the outskirts of Warsaw by July 1944, when its command was transferred to Georgy Zhukov. Rokossovsky commanded the 2nd Belorussian Front during the Vistula–Oder Offensive into Germany and final victory.

After the war, Rokossovsky was the commander of the Soviet forces in Poland from 1945 to 1949, when he was given the title of Marshal of Poland and became the Defence Minister of the newly-established Polish People's Republic. He also served as deputy chairman of its Council of Ministers from 1952 to 1954. After being forced out of his post in 1956 when Władysław Gomułka became leader during the Polish October, Rokossovsky returned to the Soviet Union, where he lived out the rest of his life until his death in 1968.

== Early life ==
Rokossowski was born on 21 December [O.S. 9 December] 1896. Sources differ on his birthplace, which is given as Velikiye Luki, as Warsaw, then part of Congress Poland under Russian rule, or as the village of Telekhany in the Brest Region of modern Belarus, then also part of the Russian Empire. The Great Russian Encyclopedia and the Polish Institute of National Remembrance give Velikiye Luki, while the Polish history portal dzieje.pl gives Warsaw. His family had moved to Warsaw following the appointment of his father as the inspector of the Warsaw Railways. The Rokossovsky family were members of the Polish nobility (of the Oksza coat of arms), and over generations had produced many cavalry officers. However, Konstantin's father, Ksawery Wojciech Rokossowski, worked as a civil railway official in the Russian Empire. His mother, Antonina Ovsyannikova, was Russian and a teacher. Other sources describe his father as a railway locomotive driver and his mother as a teacher of Russian.

Orphaned at 14, Rokossovsky started working in a stocking factory. In 1911, at age 15, he became an apprentice stonemason. Much later in his life, the government of the Polish People's Republic used this fact for propaganda, claiming that Rokossovsky had helped to build Warsaw's Poniatowski Bridge. After his parents' deaths, he worked in factories in the Wola district of Warsaw and in stonemasons' workshops. In 1912, he was arrested for taking part in a May Day march and spent six weeks in Pawiak prison.

When Rokossovsky enlisted in the Imperial Russian Army at the start of the First World War, his patronymic Ksaveryevich was Russified to Konstantinovich. This was easier for his fellow troops to pronounce who were in the 5th Kargopol Dragoon Regiment. He later also adopted a more Russian spelling of his surname.

== Early military career ==
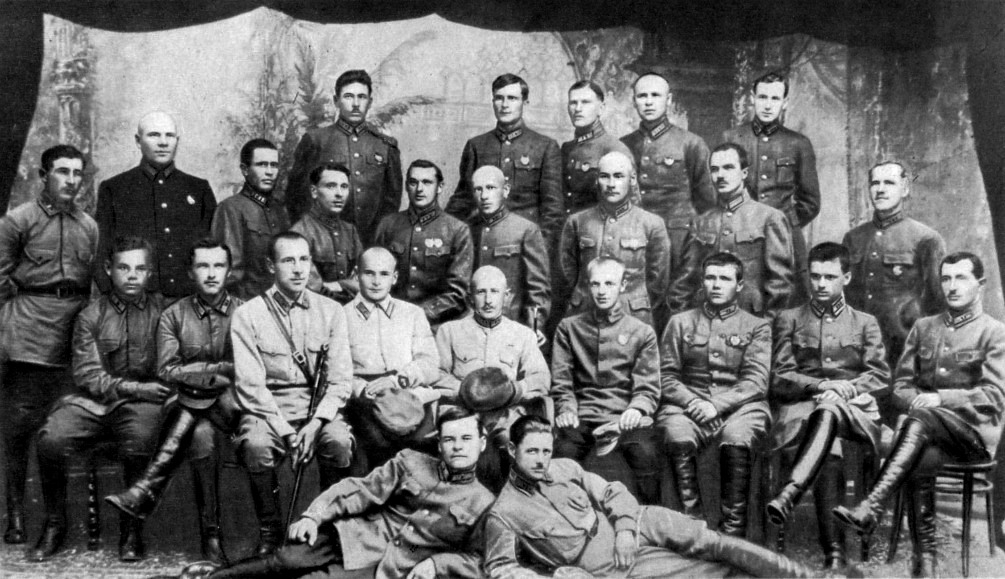
Graduates of the Leningrad Higher Cavalry School 1924/25 Sitting in the second row (right to left): 1. Bagramyan, 3. Yeremenko. In the third row (right to left): 1. Zhukov, 5. Rokossovsky, 8. Ivan Konev. Standing in the fourth row (right to left): 2. Semyon Timoshenko

On joining the Kargopolsky 5th Dragoon Regiment, Rokossovsky soon showed himself a talented soldier and leader. He served in the cavalry throughout the war, ending with the rank of a junior non-commissioned officer. He was wounded twice during the war and awarded the Cross of St George. The cross was of the 4th class. In December 1917, he joined the Red Guard, and he soon entered the ranks of the Red Army. He joined the Bolshevik Party in 1919.

During the Russian Civil War, he commanded a cavalry squadron of the Kargopolsky Red Guards Cavalry Detachment in the campaigns against the White Guard armies of Aleksandr Kolchak in the Urals. In November 1919, he was wounded in the shoulder there by an opposing officer whom he later killed when his cavalry overran an enemy headquarters. Rokossovsky received Soviet Russia's highest military decoration at the time, the Order of the Red Banner. He received the order in 1920 and again in 1921, and was eventually awarded it six times.

In 1921, he commanded the 35th Independent Cavalry Regiment stationed in Irkutsk and played an important role in bringing Damdin Sükhbaatar, the founder of the Mongolian People's Republic, to power.

Roman von Ungern-Sternberg, a legendary "White Russian" general, adventurer and mystic, allegedly believed he was the reincarnation of Genghis Khan and had driven Chinese occupying forces out of Mongolia in 1920. He set himself up as dictator in Outer Mongolia. The next summer, when Ungern-Sternberg moved to capture the border town of Troitskosavsk, he appeared headed north and threatened to cut off the Soviet far east from the rest of the Soviet Union. Rokossovsky quickly moved south from Irkutsk and met up with allied Sükhbaatar Mongol forces, and together the units defeated Ungern-Sternberg's army, which retreated in disarray after a two-day engagement. Rokossovsky was again wounded, this time in the leg. The combined Mongol and Soviet forces soon thereafter captured Ulaanbaatar.

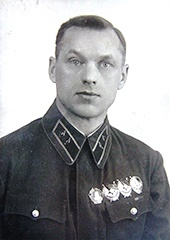
Rokossovsky as Komdiv (division commander)

Rokossovsky met his future wife, Yuliya Barmina, in Troitskosavsk (now Kyakhta) on the Mongolian border. She was a high school teacher who was fluent in four languages and who had studied Greek mythology. They married in 1923. Their daughter Ariadna was born in 1925.

In 1924 and 1925, Rokossovsky attended the Leningrad Higher Cavalry School, where he first met Georgy Zhukov. He was then reassigned to Mongolia, where from 1926 to 1928 he was a trainer for the Mongolian People's Army, serving as an instructor with its cavalry division at Ulan Bator. In July 1928, he was given command of the 5th Separate Kuban Cavalry Brigade, and in 1929 he completed advanced courses for senior commanders at the Frunze Military Academy. Soon after, while serving in the Special Red Banner Far Eastern Army under Vasily Blyukher, he took part in the Russo-Chinese Eastern Railroad War of 1929–1930. The Soviet Union intervened to return the Chinese Eastern Railway to joint Chinese and Soviet administration, after Chinese warlord Zhang Xueliang of the Republic of China attempted to seize complete control of the railway. Rokossovsky led his cavalry brigade in the conflict.

It was in the early 1930s that Rokossovsky's military career first became closely intertwined with those of Semyon Timoshenko and Georgy Zhukov: when Rokossovsky was the commander of the 7th Samara Cavalry Division, Timoshenko served as his superior Corps commander and Zhukov was a brigade commander under Rokossovsky in his division. Rokossovsky took command of the division in January 1930. He was promoted to komdiv (division commander) in 1935, and in 1936 he was given command of the 5th Cavalry Corps. Both became principal actors in his life during World War II, where he served directly under each at different times. Rokossovsky was noted for having a rivalry with Zhukov throughout World War II. He commented on Zhukov's character in an official report :

Has a strong will. Decisive and firm. Often demonstrates initiative and skillfully applies it. Disciplined. Demanding and persistent in his demands. A somewhat ungracious and not sufficiently sympathetic person. Rather stubborn. Painfully proud. In professional terms well trained. Broadly experienced as a military leader... Absolutely cannot be used in staff or teaching jobs because constitutionally he hates them.

Rokossovsky was among the first to realize the potential of armoured assault. He was an early supporter of the creation of a strong armoured corps for the Red Army, as championed by Marshal Mikhail Tukhachevsky in his theory of "deep operations".

=== Purge and rehabilitation ===
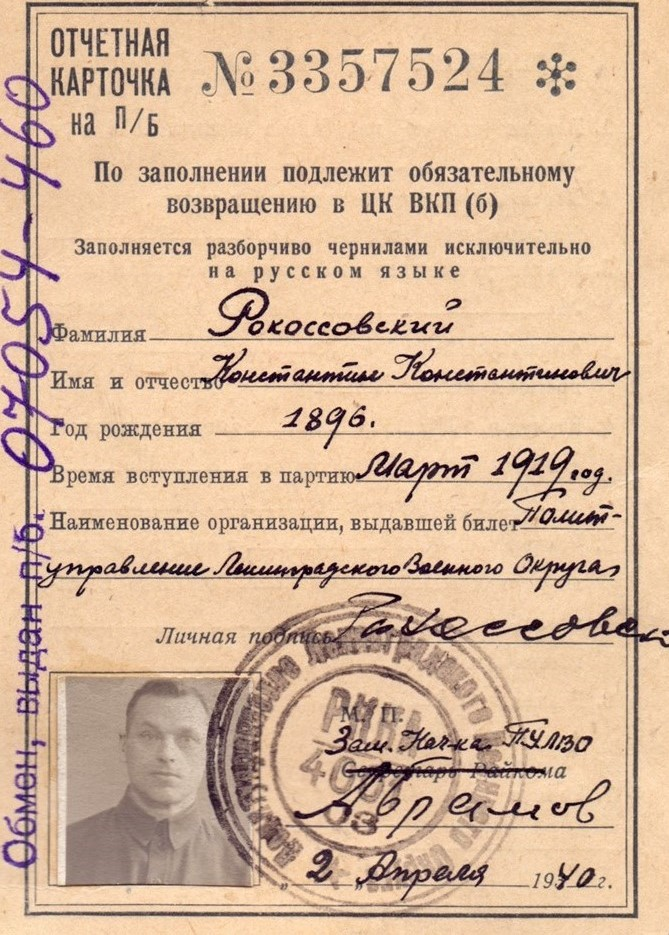
Communist party Membership card issued to Rokossovsky, following his reinstatement in 1940

Rokossovsky held senior commands until he was arrested on 17 August 1937 when he became caught up in Joseph Stalin's Great Purge and was accused of being a spy. His association with the cutting-edge methods of Marshal Tukhachevsky may have been the cause of his conflict with more traditional officers such as Semyon Budyonny, who still favoured cavalry tactics over Tukhachevsky's mass armour theories, but few historians believe that the purge of the Red Army was solely a dispute over policy. Most attribute the purges to political and military rivalries as well.

Some officers were swept up on suspicion due to past associations. In Rokossovsky's case, his Polish ancestry, association with the Special Red Banner Far Eastern Army, and the intrigues surrounding Marshal Vasily Blyukher may have been enough to cause his arrest. Blyukher was arrested shortly after Rokossovsky and died in prison without 'confessing'.

Rokossovsky, however, survived. He was variously accused of having links to Polish and Japanese intelligence and having committed acts of sabotage under Article 58, section 14: "conscious non-execution or deliberately careless execution of defined duties", a section added to the penal code in June 1937.

The charges against Rokossovsky stemmed from the case of the "Anti-Soviet Trotskyist Military Organization of the 11th Mechanized Corps". Rokossovsky was implicated after the arrest of Corps Commander Kasyan Chaykovsky who, like Rokossovsky, served in the Far East in the early 1930s. The Intelligence Chief of the Transbaikal Military District accused Rokossovsky of meeting with Colonel Komatsubara, the head of the Japanese military mission in Harbin in 1932, when he was commander of the 15th Cavalry Division in Trans-Baikal. Rokossovsky did not dispute the fact of the meeting but said that it was to resolve issues regarding Chinese prisoners. Material charges against him claimed various acts of negligence of command that were interpreted as deliberate acts of sabotage (known as "wrecking"), such as allowing the quarters of his division to become slovenly, failing to conduct training, and leading his division out into bad weather causing losses of horses and encouraging sickness among his troops.

When Rokossovsky was arrested by the NKVD, his wife and daughter were sent into internal exile. His wife Julia took odd jobs to support her and their daughter, but she was repeatedly fired when it was discovered that her husband had been arrested as a "traitor".

V. V. Rachesky, a cell mate of Rokossovsky, wrote in his memoirs that Rokossovsky blamed the persecution of innocent people on the NKVD. He thought the officer to be "naive", refusing to acknowledge Stalin's role in creating the treacherous environment. He described Rokossovsky's refusal to sign a false confession:

Those who refused to sign a false statement were beaten up, as long as the false statement was not signed. There were steadfast people who stubbornly did not sign. But there were relatively few. K. K. Rokossovsky, as he sat with me in the same cell, did not sign a false statement. But he was a brave and strong man, tall and broad-shouldered. He too was beaten.

His grandson, Colonel Konstantin Rokossovsky Vilevich, later said that his grandfather escaped execution because he refused to sign a false statement and proved to the court that the officer who his NKVD accusers claimed had denounced him had in fact been killed in 1920 during the civil war:

The evidence was based on the testimony of Adolph Yushkevich, a colleague of my grandfather in the Civil War. But my grandfather knew very well that Yushkevich died in Perekop. He said that he would sign [a confession] if Adolph was brought for a confrontation. They looked for Yushkevich and found that he had died long before.

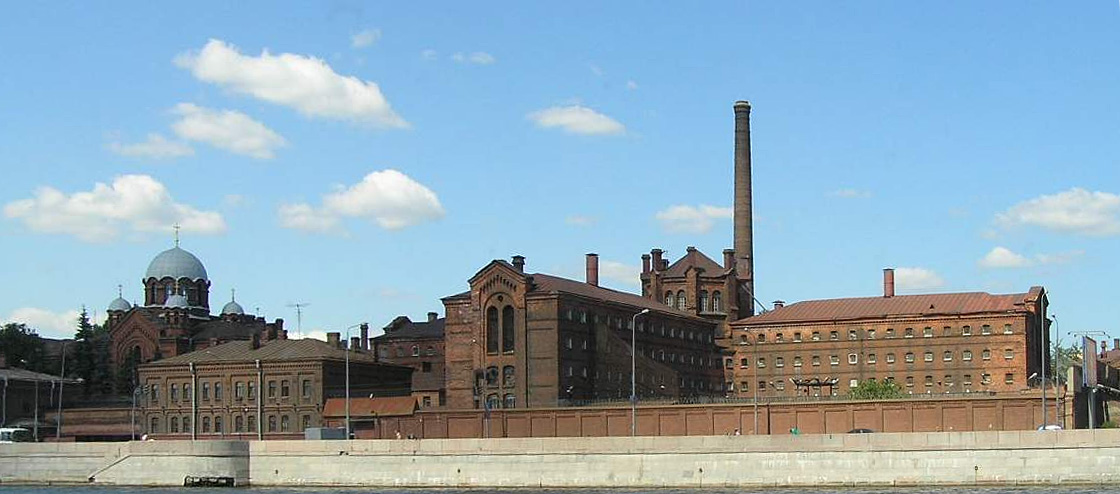
Kresty Prison, where Rokossovsky was imprisoned in Leningrad (the city was renamed as Saint Petersburg after the fall of the Soviet Union)

Alexander Solzhenitsyn reports that Rokossovsky endured two mock shooting events, where he was taken out at night by a firing squad as if to be executed, but then returned to prison. The Russian encyclopedia Krugosvet likewise states that he was beaten and twice taken out to be shot, with blank rounds fired. Living relatives say that Svetlana Pavlovna, wife of Marshal Kazakov, confirmed that Rokossovsky sustained severe injuries, including broken and denailed fingers, pulled teeth, cracked ribs, and mock shooting ceremonies. Rokossovsky never discussed his trial and imprisonment with his family. He told his daughter Ariadne that since then, he always kept a gun, because he would not surrender alive if they came to arrest him again. He was reinstated in the Communist Party in 1940.

In his famous "secret speech" of 1956, Nikita Khrushchev, spoke about the purges and was likely referring implicitly to Rokossovsky when he stated, "suffice to say that those of them who managed to survive, despite severe tortures to which they were subjected in the prisons, have from the first war days shown themselves real patriots and heroically fought for the glory of the Fatherland".

== World War II ==
After his trial, Rokossovsky was held in the Kresty Prison in Leningrad until he was released on 22 March 1940. The case against him was dropped, and he was freed on the recommendation of Timoshenko, the People's Commissar for Defence. His release coincided with a relaxation of the Great Purge after the former NKVD chief Nikolay Yezhov, who had been replaced by Lavrentiy Beria, was executed on 4 February 1940.

Semyon Timoshenko, who had been named People's Commissar for Defence of the Soviet Union after the debacle of the Winter War and was in urgent need of experienced officers to fill command posts for the rapidly expanding Soviet army, returned Rokossovsky to the command of the 5th Cavalry Corps at the rank of colonel. Subsequently, the 5th Cavalry Corps participated in the occupation of Bessarabia and he was soon promoted to the rank of a major general, and in November 1940 he was given the command of the 9th Mechanized Corps, as part of M.I. Potapov's 5th Army under Mikhail Kirponos, commander of the Kiev Military District, which would later be renamed the Southwestern Front at the outbreak of hostilities with Germany.

=== 1941: Operation Barbarossa; Dubno, Smolensk and Moscow ===
The German army is a machine, and machines can be broken!

==== Battle of Dubno ====
When Nazi Germany attacked the Soviet Union in June 1941, Rokossovsky was serving as the commander of the 9th Mechanized Corps with the 35th and 20th Tank Divisions, and the 131st Motorized Division under his command.

He was immediately engaged in the early tank battles that raged around the Lutsk–Dubno–Brody triangle, also known as the Battle of Brody — an early Soviet counter-attack that was the most significant Soviet tank operation of the early stages of Operation Barbarossa.

The battle involved a large-scale attack involving five mechanized corps aimed at penetrating the German line in the direction of Lublin based on a plan developed before hostilities commenced. Orders for the attack from Zhukov were met with little enthusiasm from the Southwestern Front staff that wanted to maintain a defensive posture. Nonetheless, the attack proceeded. The operation met with numerous difficulties in mobilization, coordination, communication, transportation and execution but scored some initial successes, which were parried by the quick action of Von Rundstedt's Army Group South in Ukraine and ended in the destruction of most of the participating Soviet forces.

Upon receiving his orders Rokossovsky, whose divisions were stationed far to the rear of the frontier, had to commandeer trucks from the local reserve to carry munitions, and mount some of his infantry on tanks while the rest were forced to walk, splitting his forces. As a consequence, his forces were behind schedule and only an advanced guard were able to meet the 26 June "jump off", and entered the fray piecemeal. His orders were to move forward and take up positions around Lutsk north of the town of Dubno in co-ordination with the 19th Mechanized Corps under N. V. Feklenko, and attack south-west, while the Mechanized Corps of the 6th Army attacked northward from Brody to meet them, with the intent of cutting off the advance of the 11th Panzer Division east.

On 25 June, Rokossovsky's 131st Motorized were quickly driven out of their position at Lutsk by the 14th Panzer Division, but the 35th and 20th Tank divisions were able to cobble together advance forces to cut the Lutsk–Dubno road, even though their full force had not yet arrived on the battlefield. On the same day, elements of the 19th Mechanized Corps, operating to his east out of Rovno, had succeeded in temporarily driving the rearguard of the 11th Panzer Division from Dubno, cutting off its advance units. In response the 13th Panzer Division attacked south from Lutsk the next day clearing Rokossovsky's forces from the road and allowing German infantry to recapture Dubno, while it drove off the 19th Mechanized and captured Rovno in Rokossovsky's rear.

As German resistance stiffened, Mikhail Kirponos, the commander of the Southwestern Front, issued instructions to cease offensive operations that were immediately countermanded by his superior, Chief of General Staff G.K. Zhukov, who was visiting the headquarters. Zhukov insisted that the counter-attack continue against any counterarguments. As a result, Rokossovsky's command was bombarded with conflicting orders. According to Lieutenant-General Dmitry Ryabyshev, Rokossovsky "expressed no ambivalence about the proposed counteroffensive" and refused a direct order, effectively ending the dispute between Zhukov and Kirponos:

We had once again received an order to counterattack. However, the enemy outnumbered us to such a degree, that I took on the personal responsibility of ordering to halt the counteroffensive and to meet the enemy in prepared defences.

— Konstantin Rokossovsky

Because of this, Ryabyshev's 8th Mechanized, which had also scored some early successes operating out of Brody, was in effect continuing to attack from the south with the expectation of support from Rokossovsky, who had stood down his forces, and did not arrive from the north. Neither were aware of this fact, because there was no available direct communication between the individual corps, an example of how the endemic communication problems helped foil the Soviet efforts.

Throughout the next days, Rokossovsky's forces put considerable pressure on the Germans at Lutsk and tried to recapture Rovno in their rear, while stopping the advance of the 14th Panzer by ambushing them with 85mm anti-tank guns at close range and with good effect. He observed in his memoirs that "the terrain off-road was wooded and swampy, keeping the German advance to the road. The artillery Regiment of the 20th Tank division deployed its newly issued 85mm guns to cover the road and with direct fire repulsed the advancing Panzers.

The battles around Lutsk, Dubno and Brody fought by the 8th, 9th and 19th Mechanized Corps were most notable among Soviet operations in the early days of Barbarossa because the Southwestern Front was able to organize active operations, unlike most sectors of the front where the German assault was met with operational paralysis, and bought time to reorganize defense along the line of the old Polish border.

Sporadic attempts were made to close the widening gap between the Soviet 5th and 6th Armies, as the Germans advanced on Kiev, but the Soviet tank forces were but a fraction of their former strength. By 7 July, Rokossovsky's 9th Mechanized Corps had been reduced to 64 tanks, out of its original complement of 316.

==== Battle of Smolensk ====
While Rokossovsky and his fellow Mechanized Corps commanders of the 5th and 6th Army had been interdicting Army Group South's advance in Ukraine, complete disorder and panic gripped the Soviet forces in Byelorussia, where the disabling impact of poor organization, logistics and communications were exponentially greater. The Red Army collapsed under the well coordinated attack of Field Marshal von Bock's Army Group Center. Within seventeen days, during the Battle of Białystok–Minsk, three quarters of D.G. Pavlov's Western Front was put out of action, whether dispersed, captured or killed. Of its initial complement of 625,000 soldiers, 290,000 were taken prisoner and 1,500 guns and 2,500 tanks were captured or destroyed. By 30 June, the Germans had reached the approaches of the Dnepr river bend where the river departs from its east–west flow, and heads south. The way was open to the strategically important city of Smolensk, where Marshal Simon Timoshenko was reassembling the shattered Western Front on a new defense line.

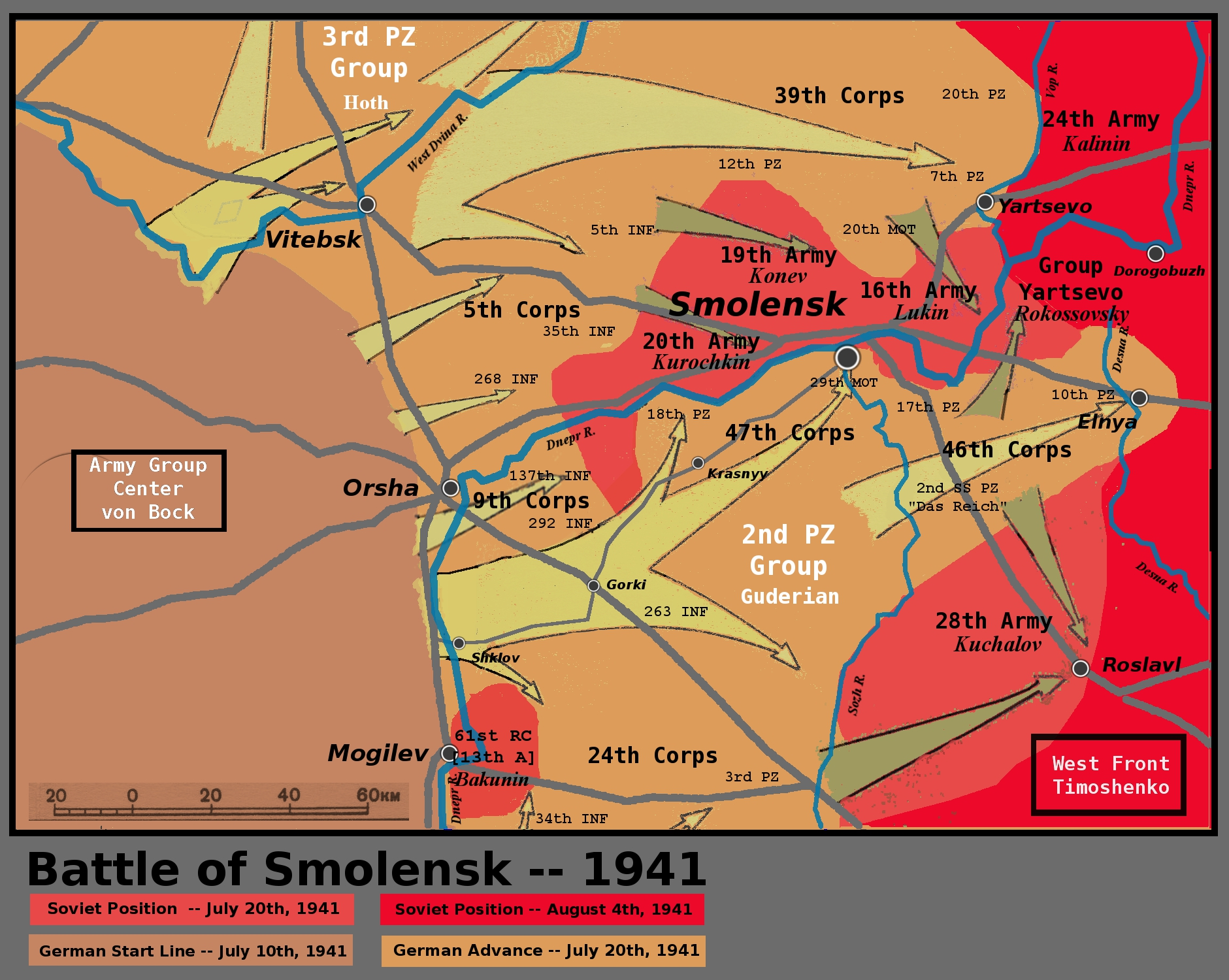
Battle of Smolensk Diagram

The Battle of Smolensk commenced on 10 July when Army Group Center began advancing on a broad front to the north and south banks of the Dnepr river, just beyond the bend where it begins its southward flow.

The 9th Army attacked north-east toward Veliki Luki. The 3rd Panzer Group under General Hermann Hoth struck east at Vitebsk and then attacked along the land bridge that separates the West Dvina and Dnepr rivers with the aim of enveloping Smolensk from the north. Heinz Guderian's 2nd Panzer Group pushed toward Smolensk directly through Orsha and bypassed Mogilev with the ultimate objective of making a deep penetration far to the rear of the Soviet front line beyond Yelnya and toward Moscow.

Despite his insubordination during the Battle of Dubno, Rokossovsky was ordered to Moscow on 13 July to take command of the remnants of the 4th Army where he was to serve under Marshal Timoshenko who had replaced the disgraced Pavlov as the Western Front commander on 2 July, shortly after he and the majority of his staff had been tried and shot in the wake of the disaster at the frontier.

On 15 July, the same day that Rokossovsky was restored to the rank of lieutenant general, the rank he had held previous to his arrest, Major General Funck's 7th Panzer Division from the 3rd Panzer Group arrived at Yartsevo behind Smolensk. The next day motorized infantry from the 2nd Panzer Group forced most of the Soviet defenders from Smolensk, reducing the gap between 2nd and 3rd Panzer Groups to less than 20 kilometers. The 16th, 19th and 20th Soviet armies were threatened with impending encirclement and now strung out along the north bank of the river contained in a triangle between Vitebsk to the north-west, Yartsevo to the north-east, and Smolensk to the South.

With his front rapidly deteriorating Timoshenko released Rokossovsky from 4th Army (a command he had assumed in name only) and gave him the task of assembling a stopgap formation to be called "Group Yartsevo" that would deal with the emergency presented by the sudden appearance of the 7th Panzer at Yartsevo. This ad hoc operational group was to defend the bridgeheads of the Vop river, a tributary of the Dnepr, and prevent the southern and northern wings of the Panzer envelopment from converging at the Dnepr.

Collapse seemed imminent. Stalin, unmoved, reiterated his demand to Timoshenko that Smolensk should not be surrendered and called the "evacuation attitude" of the front-line commanders of the besieged armies criminally "treasonous". Rather than retreat, Timoshenko's armies would stand their ground and attempt to recapture Smolensk.

"Group Yartsevo" was in theory a large army-sized formation, but when Rokossovsky arrived at Timoshenko's headquarters on the evening of the 17th, he was in fact in charge of his own small staff, two quad anti-aircraft machine guns mounted on trucks and a radio van. At first, Rokossovsky had to resort to pulling together a fighting group from reserve units and retreating stragglers, but over the coming days it became a more substantial force. Retreating regiments and divisions from the 44th Rifle Corps filtered out of the Smolensk pocket and were transferred to his command and fresh forces arrived from the reserve—the 107th Tank Division (formerly the 69th Motorized Division from the Trans-Baikal Military District) and the 101st Tank Division equipped with 220 outdated but functional tanks.

What commenced was a confusing seesaw battle for control of Smolensk that saw portions of the city change hands several times over the next week, while Rokossovsky's group held the back door open and harassed the advanced German panzer formations.

Then we began going over to the offense by delivering blows against the Germans, first in one sector and then in another, frequently scoring appreciable tactical success, which helped strengthen discipline among the troops and strengthened the confidence of the officers and men, who saw that they could actually beat the enemy, which meant a lot at that time. Our activity apparently puzzled the enemy command, which encountered resistance where it was not expected; they saw that our troops not only fought back but also attacked (even if not always successfully). This tended to create an exaggerated idea of our forces in the sector, and the enemy failed to take advantage of his great superiority.

— Konstantin Rokossovsky

Day by day, Rokossovsky's forces became stronger. As the Smolensk pocket deflated under German pressure Rokossovsky was able to press into service retreating soldiers and formations that slipped out of the pocket and employed them reinforcing the perimeter of the Yartsevo corridor. Eventually, the 38th Rifle Division was handed over to Rokossovsky when Timoshenko rationalized the command of the shrinking formations in the Smolensk pocket by disbanding Ivan Konev's 19th Army.

The Germans were faced with the dilemma of both containing the encircled armies, and dealing with Rokossovsky's burgeoning forces to their east. The 7th Panzer was soon joined by the 12th Panzer at Yartsevo, while the 20th held down their northern flank. With so many Panzer divisions tied down in defensive position containing Soviet activity both inside and outside of the pocket, much of the offensive punch of the Panzer Groups was blunted.

Even though "Group Yartsevo" had managed to halt the advance of Hoth's 3rd Panzer Group at Yartsevo, Guderian's 2nd Panzer Group continued to advance south of the Dnepr on Rokossovsky's left flank, becoming a more tangible threat with each passing day. On 18 July, Guderian's 10th Panzer Division entered the town of Yelnya 70 km south of Yartsevo and captured it on the 20th.

But on 19 July, German operational objectives for Smolensk changed when Hitler issued Führer Directive 33, ordering the Wehrmacht to temporarily cease its drive on Moscow, so that it could wheel south and finish off the Soviet defenders holding onto Kiev in Ukraine. As a result, Guderian's intended deep penetration was operationally obsolete, and Field Marshal von Bock became intent on mopping up the Soviet defenders at Smolensk so that the Panzer Groups could be released to Army Group South. Impatient with Guderian's slow going, Von Bock urged Guderian to drive north and close the Yartsevo corridor. In anticipation of this development, Rokossovsky had deployed the 107th Tank division to hold the area immediately south of Dnepr, and when the 10th Panzer undertook an unsupported attack northward toward Dorogobuzh from Yelnya, it was repulsed after three days of heavy fighting. The situation temporarily stabilized.

On 20 July, Zhukov ordered a general counterattack with the aim of relieving the encircled armies, and beginning on 21 July attacks began along the entire front, and continued for a number of days in an uncoordinated fashion. Meanwhile, the defenders in the pocket increased their efforts to recapture Smolensk. Attacks were made from the south against the flank of Guderian's advanced forces at Yelnya and Roslavl, and north of Yartsevo against Hoth's 2nd Panzer Group. Deep cavalry penetrations were made behind the German front behind Mogilev, disrupting logistics. Uncoordinated as the attacks were they had the effect of distracting the German advance for several days as intense battles took place increasing casualties on both sides. On the 24th, Rokossovsky temporarily drove Funk's 7th Panzer from Yartsevo.

Unsupported by infantry the Wehrmacht advanced Panzer formations were taking inordinate casualties. To make further headway, both Hoth and Guderian needed to bring infantry forward to disentangle their mobile forces from their containment operations, and free them for attack, slowing the pace of advance.

By 25 July, Guderian had been able to free his considerable tank forces from defensive duties, and mobilized the 17th Panzer Division for a concerted effort to advance north and clear Rokossovsky from his tenuous position, but the 17th Panzer was still unable to reach the Dnepr and finally close the pocket. Nonetheless, under attack from north and south Rokossovsky was unable to prevent Hoth's 20th Motorized Infantry from capturing bridgeheads over the Dnepr on the 27th, sealing the pocket. The encircled armies fought intense breakout battles, and on the 28th Timoshenko ordered Rokossovsky to reopen the corridor by recapturing the bridgeheads. While he was unable to regain control of the river crossings, the 101st Tank Division recaptured Yartsevo on the 29th and held it for a few critical days.

Despite strenuous efforts over the next week, Rokossovsky was not able to secure a link to the armies in the pocket, but the intense Soviet activity kept the Germans from consolidating their front, allowing elements of the encircled 16th army to effect a breakout. By 4 August, the front had stabilized and the defending armies within the pocket ceased resistance or had ceased to exist.

Rokossovsky is credited with slowing the German attack, and holding the Yartsevo corridor open for long enough to prevent the capture and destruction of a considerable numbers of Soviet troops. The broader consequences of Soviet resistance at Smolensk are evident in the Führer Directive No. 34, issued on 30 July 1941:

The development of the situation in the last few days, the appearance of strong enemy forces on the front and to the flanks of Army Group Centre, the supply position, and the need to give 2nd and 3rd Armoured Groups about ten days to rehabilitate their units, make it necessary to postpone for the moment the further tasks and objectives laid down in Directive 33 of 19th July and in the Supplement of 23rd July.

— Adolf Hitler

==== Battle of Moscow ====
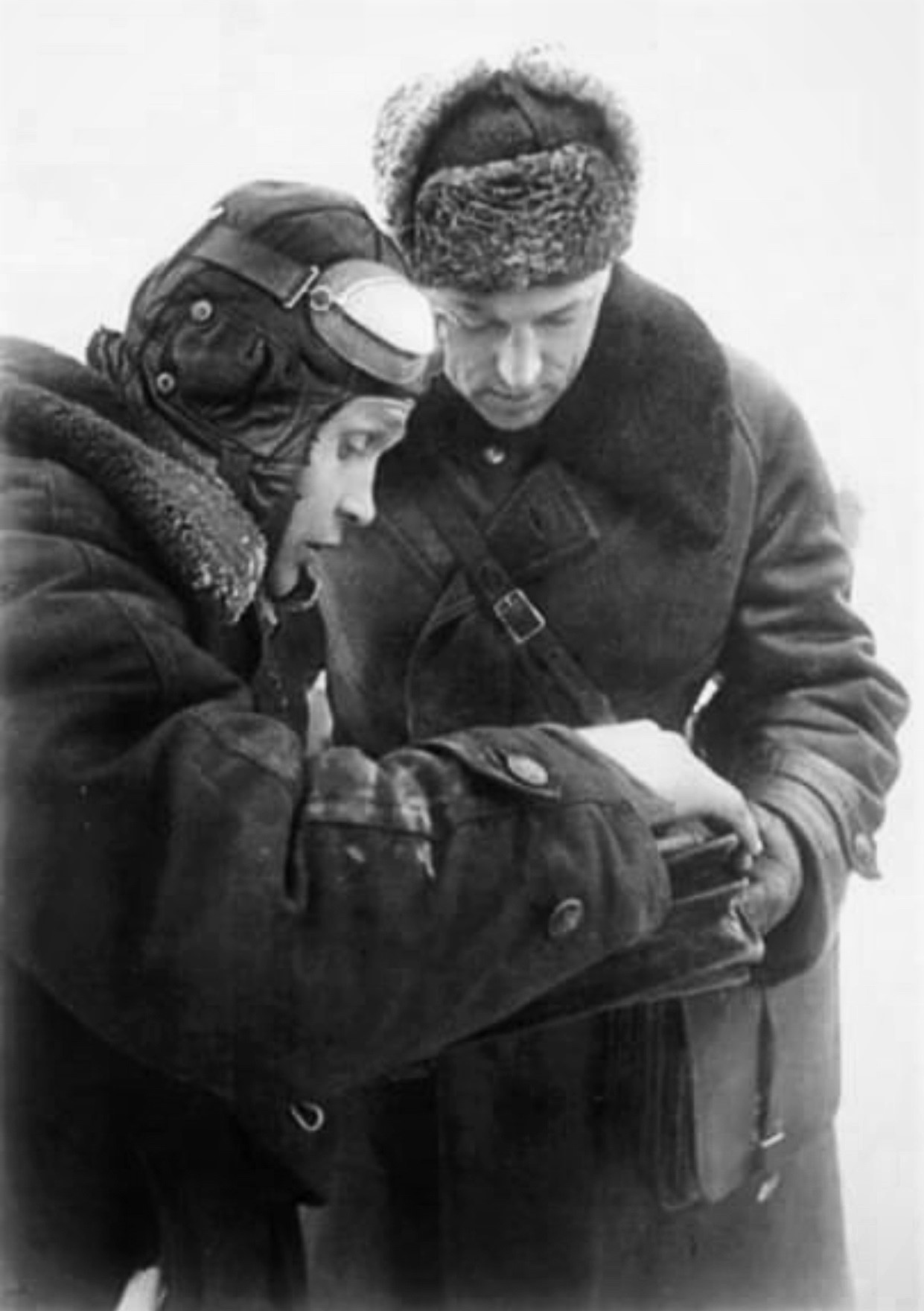
Rokossovsky during the Battle of Moscow

In August 1941, Rokossovsky took command of the 16th Army. He was ordered to defend the approaches to Moscow, and was now under the direct command of General Georgy Zhukov, his former subordinate. The 16th Army (later renamed the 11th Guards Army) played a key role in the Battle of Moscow when it was deployed along the main axis of the German advance along the Volokolamsk Highway that was a central junction of the bitter fighting during the German winter offensive of 1941 (Operation Typhoon), as well as the subsequent Soviet counter-attack of 1941–42.

On 18 November, during the last-ditch efforts of the Wehrmacht to encircle Moscow in 1941, General Rokossovsky, his soldiers under heavy pressure from Erich Hoepner's 4th Panzer Group, asked his immediate superior, Zhukov, if he could withdraw the 16th Army to more advantageous positions. Zhukov categorically refused. Rokossovsky went over Zhukov's head, and spoke directly to Marshal Boris Shaposhnikov, now Chief of the General Staff in Zhukov's place. After reviewing the situation, Shaposhnikov immediately ordered a withdrawal. Zhukov reacted at once. He revoked the order of the superior officer, and ordered Rokossovsky to hold the position. In the immediate aftermath, Rokossovsky's army was pushed aside and the 3rd and 4th Panzer Groups were able to gain strategically important positions north of Moscow, but this marked the high point of the German advance upon Moscow. Throughout Operation Typhoon, Rokossovsky's 16th army had taken the brunt of the German effort to capture Moscow.

==== 1942: Operation Fall Blau ====
In March 1942, Rokossovsky was badly injured by a piece of shrapnel. It was widely rumored that Valentina Serova was a mistress of Rokossovsky during this time. While it is true that Serova, working as a hospital volunteer, met Rokossovsky several times while he was recovering from his wound, it is not acknowledged they were lovers. Evidence for their close relationship was found in the accounts of frontline soldiers. Rokossovsky also had another mistress at this time, Dr. Lt. Galina Talanova, with whom he had a daughter in 1945. He gave the child his surname. After two months in a Moscow hospital, Rokossovsky was reunited briefly with the 16th Army.

===== Retreat to the Don =====
During 1942, the Wehrmacht commenced "Fall Blau" and switched the axis of their offensive from Moscow and attacked southward into the eastern Ukraine towards the Don–Volga river line, Rostov, Voronezh, Stalingrad and the Caucasus beyond. There the Germans hoped to secure fresh supplies of oil to fuel their armies. Unlike the early days of 1941 the stiffening Soviet army maintained relatively good order in retreat, backing up along a defensive line along the Don river.

On 13 July 1942, Rokossovsky was given his first operational level command, a sign of his growing stature. The battles of Smolensk and Moscow had by no measure resulted in Red Army victory, but the front-line formations under his command were central to frustrating the Wehrmacht efforts to achieve the same and this was most likely reflected in Stalin's decision to make him commander of the Bryansk Front, where Stavka expected the main line of German attack to be renewed against Moscow in 1942—Rokossovsky was a trusted officer who could be counted on in a tight squeeze.

As the German offensive turned south, and toward Voronezh, the Bryansk sector turned out to be so quiet that Stavka shuffled the 38th Army to General Vatutin's Voronezh Front, during the heated Battle of Voronezh, where the Germans attempted to ford the Don River, and compromise the entire Soviet Don River defense. Rokossovsky recounts in his memoirs that during that summer Stalin phoned him personally to ask "whether I did not find the situation too dull for my liking" and was then recalled to Moscow to undertake command of a new operation:

The plan was to concentrate a strong force (no less than three combined armies and several armoured corps) on the flank of the enemy occupying the country between the Don and the Volga with the purpose of counter-attacking south and south-east from the vicinity of Serafimovich.

Subsequent events delayed the attack and it was shelved, only later to be resurrected as "Operation Uranus" with Vatutin playing the lead role, however Walsh asserts that Rokossovsky being originally selected to lead the attack "was symptomatic of his standing and the importance of his location as an indicator of significant, impending Soviet operations."

===== Operation Uranus =====
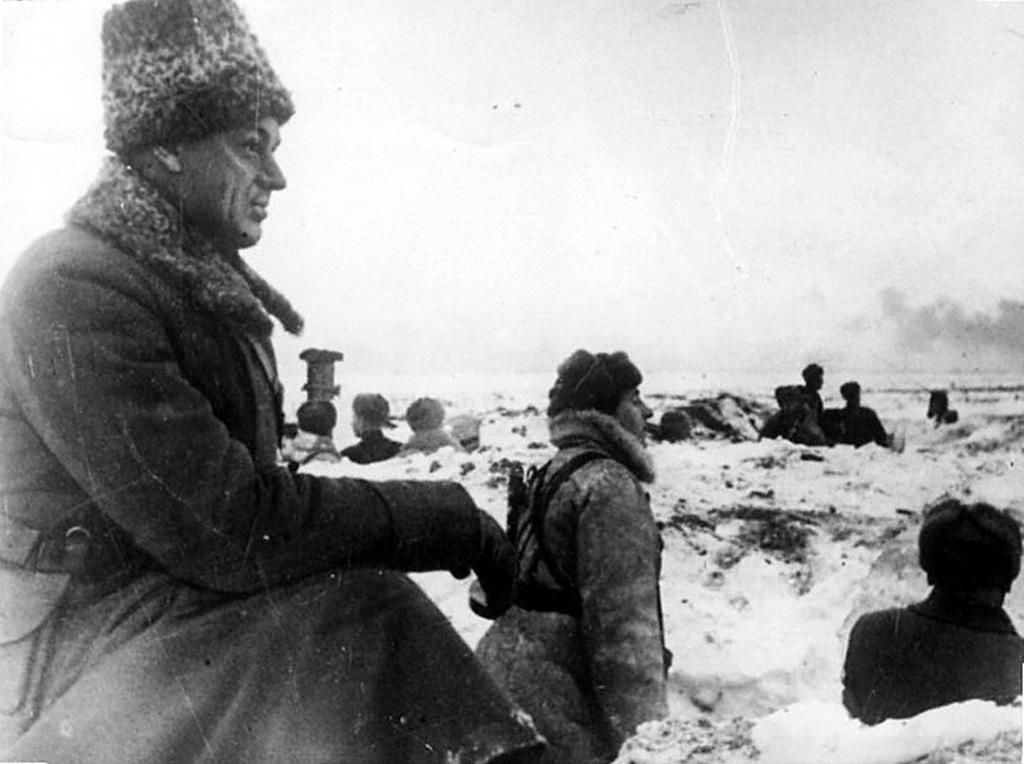
Rokossovsky as commander of the Don Front, near Stalingrad, 1942

By the fall of 1942, the German army had pulled up along the new Soviet defense at the Don and Volga rivers, centered at Stalingrad, and had broken through south of Rostov toward the strategic oil centers of Tbilisi and Baku. Stalin was determined that Stalingrad should not fall, and the Red Army was given strict orders to hold the city at any cost. The Battle of Stalingrad became a struggle for control of the city that drew in combatants from both sides in brutal house-to-house fighting.

Operation Uranus

On 28 September 1942, at Zhukov's urging, Rokossovsky was given overall command of the 65th Army (4th Tank Army), 24th Army and 66th Army, that were brought together as the Don Front as part of Stalin's much criticized reorganization of the Southern Front in preparation for the planned Soviet counterattack at Stalingrad: "Operation Uranus". This put Rokossovsky's armies directly opposite the XI, VIII and XIV Corps of the 6th Army, including the 16th Panzer and 14th Panzer divisions, all of which were destroyed in the ensuing battle.

With German forces heavily engaged at Stalingrad and spread thinly due to their deep penetrations into the Caucasus, the Wehrmacht was increasingly reliant on their Romanian and Italian allies to cover the flanks of their extended line, on the north along the Don, and to the south along the Volga. "Operation Uranus" kicked off on 17 November with the intention of making a double envelopment of Paulus's men at Stalingrad by breaking through the flanks. The Southwestern Front commanded by General Vatutin quickly overwhelmed the 3rd Romanian Army just to the north of Rokossovsky's Don Front, while Yeryomenko's Stalingrad Front began their own attack just south of Stalingrad. Rokossovsky's Don Front played a largely subordinate role in the main attack, but the 65th Army supported Vatutin's attack from the north by outflanking the left extreme of the German line where it met the Romanian 3rd Army, while the 24th and 66th squeezed the German defenders—pinning them in place as the pincers of the main attacks rapidly enveloped them.

In less than a week, in the face of deteriorating weather and blizzard conditions, the Soviet forces had sealed the gap behind Stalingrad, and had begun to reinforce their investment around the city in order to prevent an attempted escape. No organized effort was made by the 6th Army to break out, and "Operation Winter Storm", a mid-December German effort to relieve the encircled army, failed to break the Soviet defenses. Soon after, the Soviets launched "Operation Little Saturn" and completely consolidated their position.

===== Stalingrad =====
On 28 December, Stalin gave Rokossovsky the task of mopping up the Stalingrad pocket. He had at his disposal roughly 212,000 men, 6,500 guns, 2,500 tanks, and 300 aircraft, to be used against an assortment of 200,000 defenders short on food, fuel, and ammunition, including Soviet "Hiwis", Romanians and Germans. In one example, nearly half the 6th Army's 297th Infantry Division fighting force were Soviets, however its artillery detachment was rationed to one and a half shells a day. On 8 January 1943, Rokossovsky ordered a cease-fire and sent a delegation to offer terms of surrender but Paulus did not respond, and resistance continued for the better part of the month.

On 10 January, the Don Front launched "Operation Ring" to reduce the Stalingrad pocket beginning with a 55-minute barrage from 7000 rocket launchers, artillery and mortars. The defenders fought tenaciously, even as their lines slowly collapsed, causing the Don Front 26,000 casualties, and destroying half its tanks in the first three days of the operation.

On 15 January, Rokossovsky was promoted to the rank of colonel general.

On 16 January, the main airfield used to supply the beleaguered 6th Army fell, and then after a pause of a few days, the offensive was renewed capturing the last operational airfield and finally driving the German back into the city proper on 22 January.

On that same day, General Paulus asked Hitler for permission to surrender but was refused. On 26 January, the Soviets had broken the surrounded Germans into two pockets, and on 31 January, the southern pocket collapsed and Paulus surrendered. Within four days, the last significant group of defenders surrendered to Rokossovsky's command, finally ending the battle that marked the high-water mark of the German advance during the Soviet–German war. According to Britannica, the six armies of Rokossovsky's Don Front, together with other Soviet forces, trapped and destroyed the 22 divisions of the German 6th Army.

The troops of the Don Front at 4 pm on February 2nd, 1943 completed the rout and destruction of the encircled group of enemy forces in Stalingrad. Twenty-two divisions have been destroyed or taken prisoner.

— Konstantin Rokossovsky

==== 1943: Kursk ====
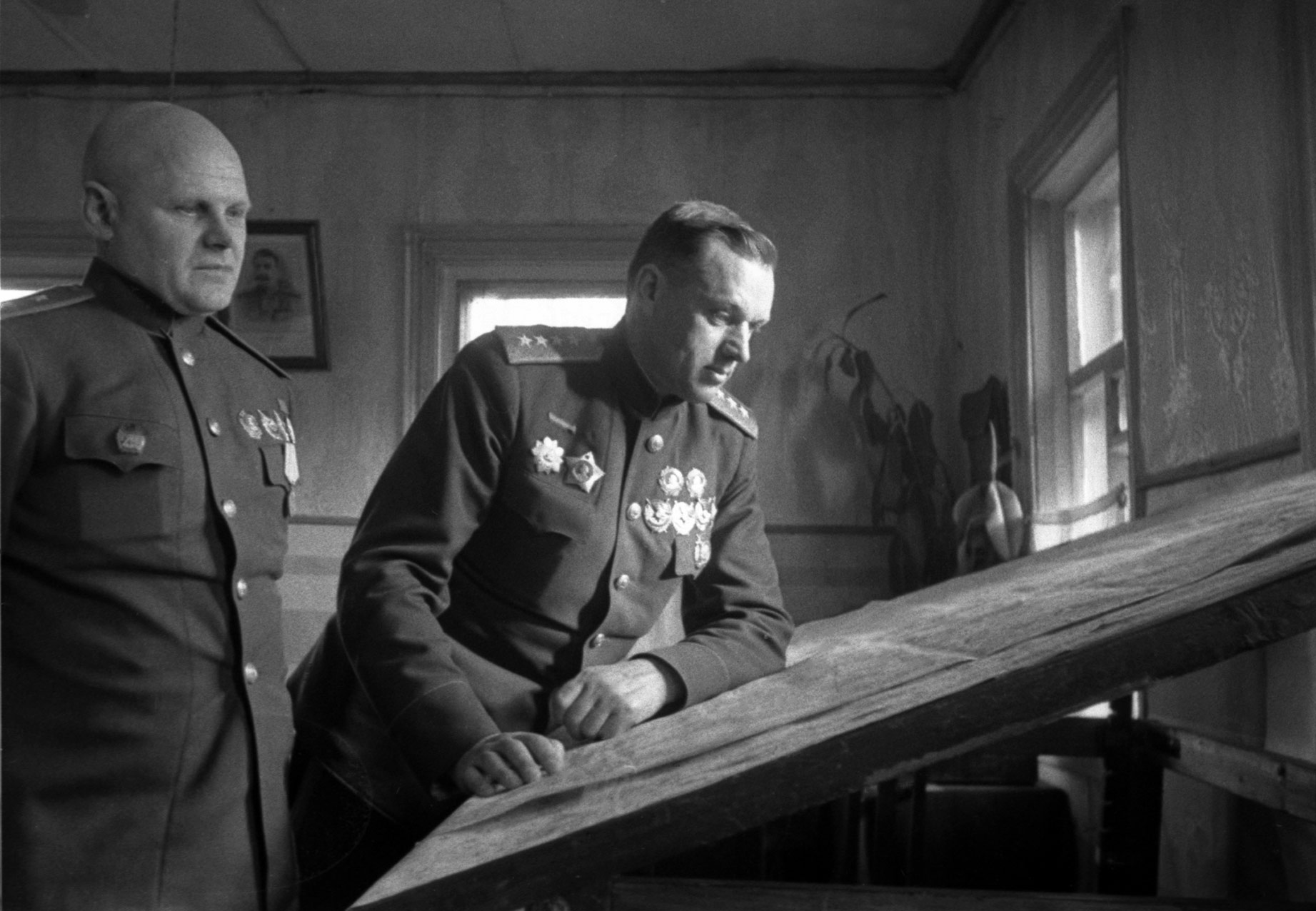
Rokossovsky with General Filipp Golikov

After the victory at Stalingrad, the Russian forces advanced to a position that created a bulge 150 km deep and 250 km wide into the German line, around the city of Kursk. This subsequently became known as the Kursk Salient. Rokossovsky's command was moved to the north of the salient and was re-designated as a new front, which was twinned with the Voronezh Front, holding the south approaches.

In February 1943, Rokossovsky was appointed commander of the Central Front. He was promoted to army general on 28 April 1943.

Both the Red Army and the Wehrmacht prepared to make a decisive offensive in the summer of 1943 at Kursk. The Germans planned to drive two thrusts, one through each flank of the salient, and unite them at Kursk in order to cut off substantial Soviet forces, recover from the strategic loss at Stalingrad, and curtail further Russian advance. The Russians, alert to the coming attack, put their offensive plans aside and prepared for defense in depth with mass anti-tank units in prepared positions.

In late June, one German bomb load in a night raid hit Rokossovsky's HQ, and he escaped only because on a whim he had decided to set up his signals group in the officers' mess. After that, Central Front HQ went underground in a bunker in the garden of a former monastery.

German plan of attack

The German offensive, code named "Operation Citadel", was originally scheduled to begin in May but the attack was delayed several times in order to bring up fresh Panzer formations equipped with Tiger I's and Panther tanks and their latest assault guns. These delays allowed for even greater Soviet preparation. It was not until early July that the Wehrmacht operations in the Kursk salient got underway.

The resulting battle was one of the largest tank battles in World War II, with massive losses of men and equipment on both sides. As the commander of the Central Front, Rokossovsky's force was faced with a determined attack by the Army Group Center's 9th Army under Walter Model, including several tank formations augmented with the newest Tiger I tanks in battalion strength. Rokossovsky for his part had organized his defenses into three defensive belts. After the initial German assault, Rokossovsky ordered counter-attacks but the Soviet armor suffered badly in the face of the new German heavy Tiger tanks, and he went back on the defensive. Despite this, the Germans were soon bogged down in the heavily mined terrain and antitank defenses, and Rokossovsky was able to reinforce. After repelling the German offensive, the Central Front defeated the German forces around Orel in the counter-offensive that followed.

Needless to say the Russians exploited their victory to the full. There were to be no more periods of quiet on the Eastern Front. From now on, the enemy was in undisputed possession of the initiative.

— Heinz Guderian

The Central Front was renamed the Belorussian Front in October 1943 and the 1st Belorussian Front in February 1944, and Rokossovsky commanded it during the Soviet advance through Byelorussia (Belarus) and into Poland.

==== 1944: Operation Bagration and the Warsaw Uprising ====
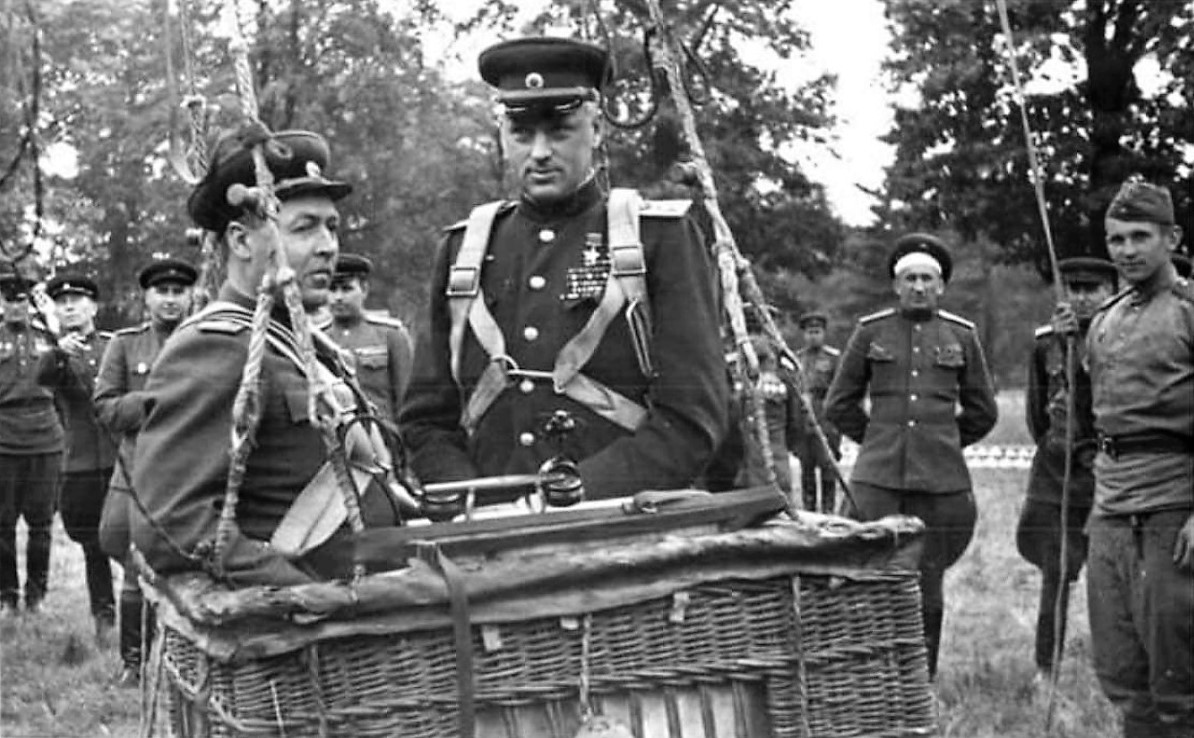
Rokossovsky in the gondola of an artillery observation balloon, summer 1945

During the planning of the major Soviet offensive, Operation Bagration, in 1944, a famous incident occurred that various sources consistently report in slightly different versions. Rokossovsky disagreed with Stalin, who demanded in accordance with Soviet war practice a single break-through of the German frontline. Rokossovsky held firm in his argument for two points of break-through. Stalin ordered Rokossovsky to "go and think it over" three times, but every time he returned and gave the same answer "two break-throughs, comrade Stalin, two break-throughs". After the third time, Stalin remained silent, but walked over to Rokossovsky and put a hand on his shoulder. A tense moment followed as the whole room waited for Stalin to rip the epaulette from Rokossovsky's shoulder. Instead, Stalin said "Your confidence speaks for your sound judgement", and ordered the attack to go forward according to Rokossovsky's plan.

The battle was successful and Rokossovsky's reputation was assured. In mid-1944, his left wing broke through north of the Pripet Marshes and advanced about 150 miles (240 km) in a week, and Minsk fell to the Red Army on 3 July. After crushing German Army Group Centre in Belarus, Rokossovsky's armies reached the east bank of the Vistula opposite Warsaw by mid-1944. For these victories, he was advanced to the rank of Marshal of the Soviet Union and was made a Hero of the Soviet Union for the first time.

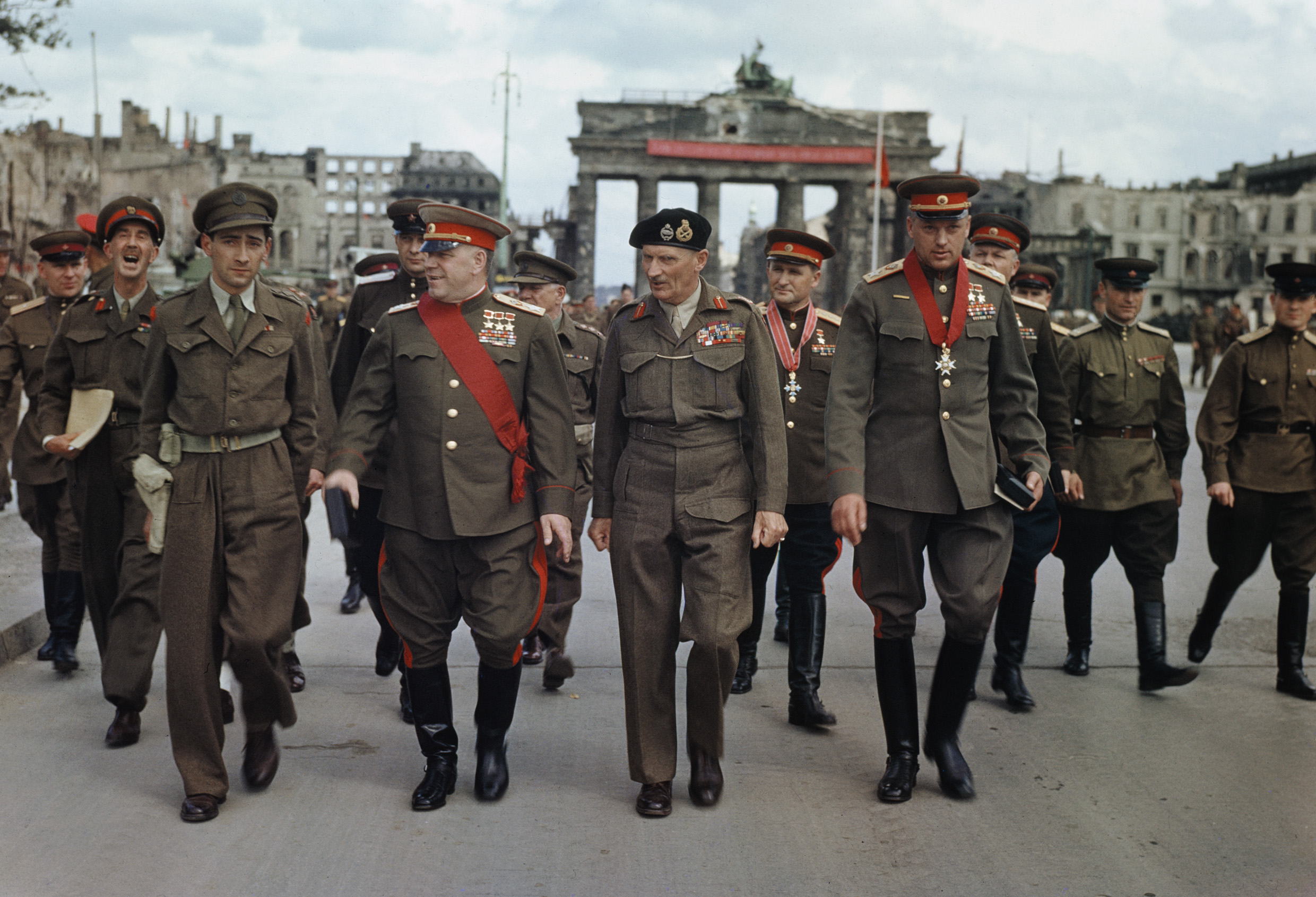
Georgy Zhukov and Rokossovsky with Bernard Montgomery and other Allied officials at the Brandenburg Gate, 12 July 1945.

As Rokossovsky's forces approached the Vistula, the Warsaw Uprising (August–October 1944) broke out in the city, led by the Polish Home Army (AK) on the orders of the Polish government in exile in London. Rokossovsky did not order reinforcement to the insurgents. When the uprising began on 1 August, his front was in no position to mount an all-out attack on Warsaw, as only lead elements of the 2nd Tank Army were near the suburb of Praga, and a German counter-attack east of the Vistula in the first week of August disrupted two Soviet brigades south of the city. On 8 August, Rokossovsky proposed an attack across the Vistula to take Warsaw by 25 August, and Zhukov approved the plan, but Stalin rejected it and shifted resources to the Baltic and the Balkans. The historian Jennifer Popowycz writes that Stalin's wish to decide Poland's post-war borders and government guided his decision not to give the Home Army sufficient help. There has been much speculation about Rokossovsky's personal views on this decision. He would always maintain that, with his communications badly stretched and enemy pressure against his northern flank mounting, committing forces to Warsaw would have been disastrous.

In November 1944, Rokossovsky was transferred to the 2nd Belorussian Front, which advanced into East Prussia and then across northern Poland to the mouth of the Oder at Stettin (now Szczecin). Zhukov took over the 1st Belorussian Front for the drive on Berlin, and the historian Jarosław Pałka has suggested that Stalin may have preferred a Russian to a Pole for that command. On 2 May 1945, troops of Rokossovsky's front met British and Canadian forces of Field Marshal Bernard Montgomery's 21st Army Group at Wismar on the Baltic coast, while the forces of Zhukov and Ivan Konev captured Berlin. In July 1945, he, Zhukov and several other Soviet officers were awarded the Order of the Bath in a ceremony at the Brandenburg Gate, in Berlin. In 1945, he was made a Hero of the Soviet Union for the second time and was awarded the Order of Victory.

== Post-war life ==
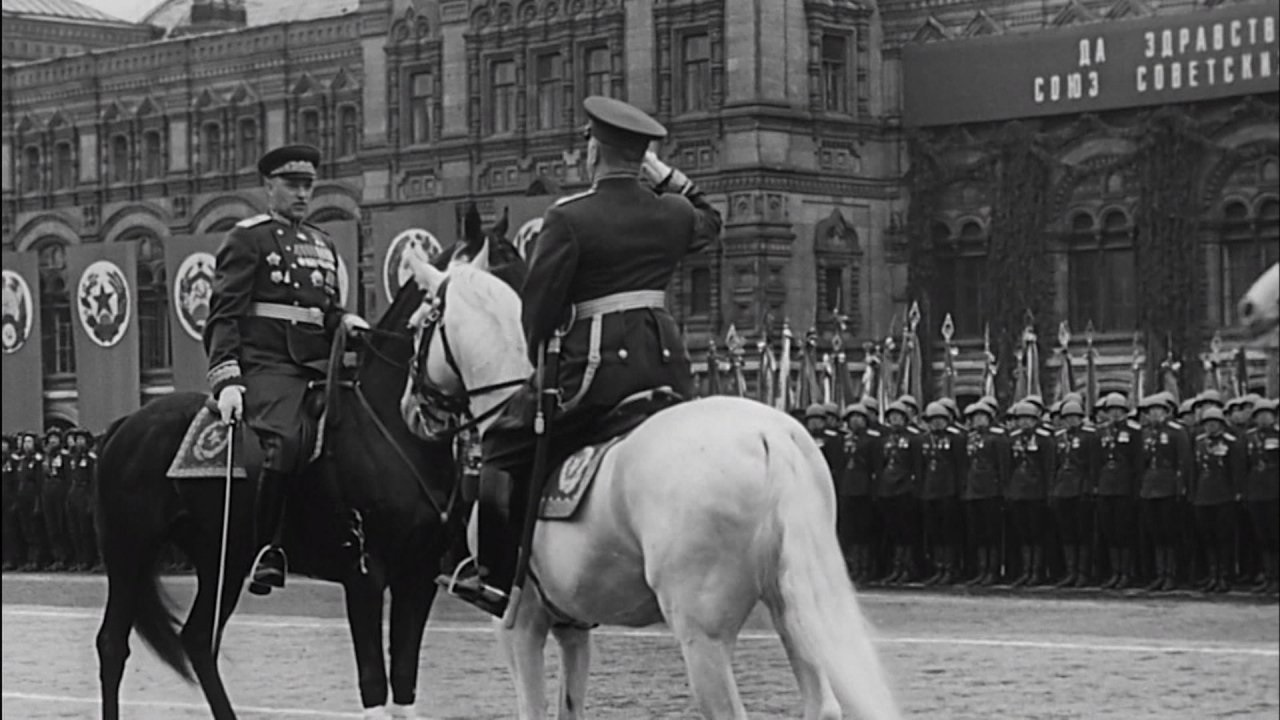
Rokossovsky with Zhukov at the 1945 victory parade in Moscow

As one of the most prominent Soviet military commanders of the Second World War, Rokossovsky was present at the Victory Parade in Red Square in Moscow on 24 June 1945 as Commanding Officer of the Parade, riding a seal brown stallion named Pole next to Marshal Georgy Zhukov, Inspector of the Parade, on his famous Idol.

After the end of the war, Rokossovsky remained in command of Soviet forces in Poland (Northern Group of Forces) until 1949. In October 1949, at the request of the Polish government under Bolesław Bierut, Stalin sent Rokossovsky to Poland. On 6 November 1949, he became the Polish Minister of National Defence and was named a Marshal of Poland. Rokossovsky is one of two foreign Marshals to receive the rank of Marshal of Poland, with other being Marshal of France Ferdinand Foch. Together with Rokossovsky, several thousand Soviet officers were placed in charge of almost all Polish military units, either as commanding officers or as advisors. He sat on the Central Committee of the Polish United Workers' Party from November 1949, and on its Politburo from 10 May 1950.

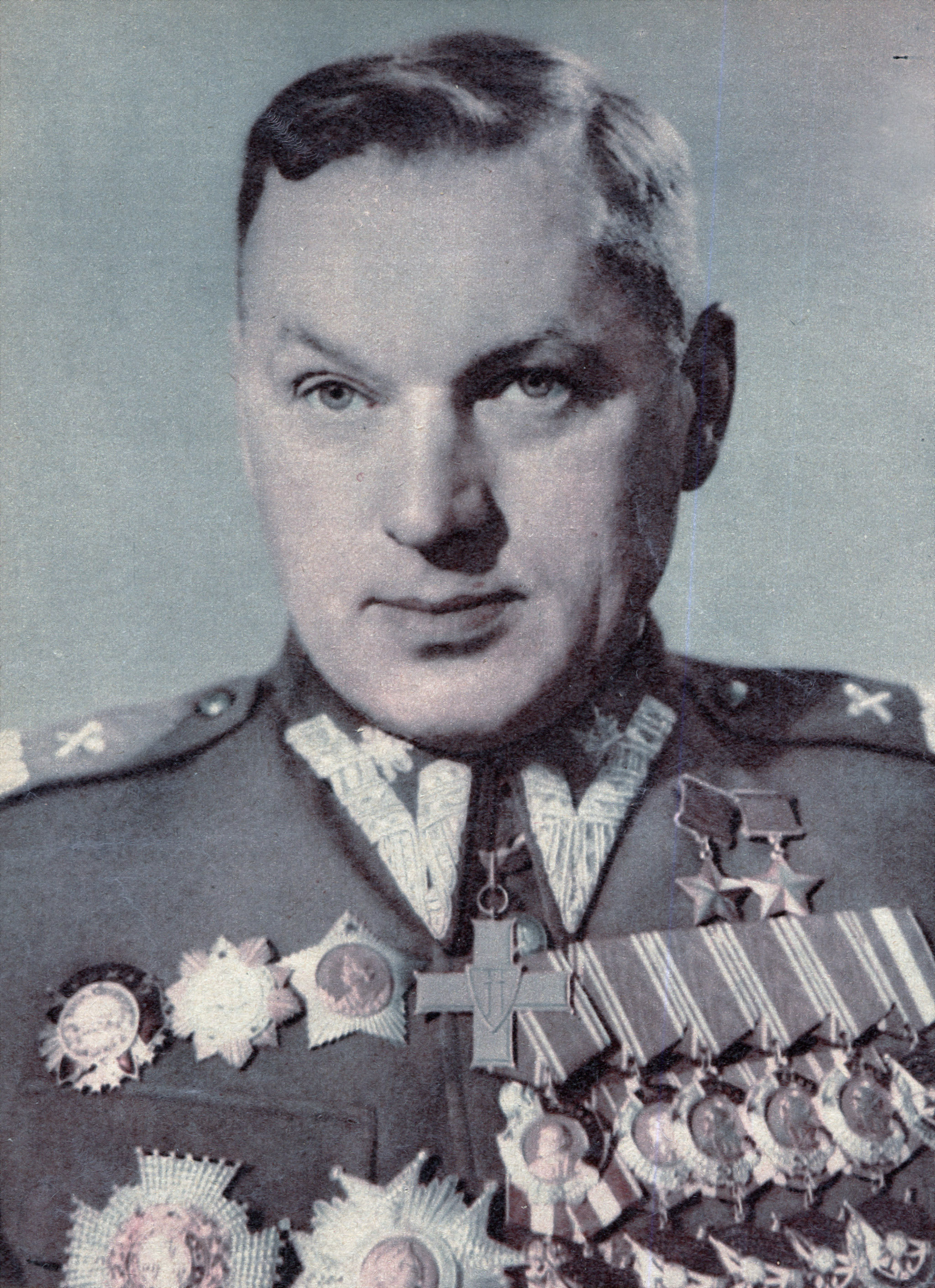
Rokossovsky in Polish uniform

On 21 November 1952, he also became a deputy chairman of the Council of Ministers of the People's Republic of Poland. Although Rokossovsky was a Pole, he had not lived in Poland for 35 years and most Poles regarded him as a Russian and Soviet emissary in the country. As Rokossovsky himself bitterly put it: "In Russia, they say I'm a Pole, in Poland they call me Russian".

Polish propaganda presented Rokossovsky as a "lost son" of Warsaw's working class who had come home. Internal reports recorded fears that Poland would be annexed as the "17th republic" of the Soviet Union, and opposition graffiti at Warsaw University and the Polytechnic read "Down with the usurper, down with Rokossowski!"

Rokossovsky played a key role in the regime's suppression of an independent Poland through Stalinization and Sovietization in general, and in the Polish Army in particular. As the de facto supreme commander of the Polish Army, he introduced various methods for the suppression of anti-Soviet activity, real or imagined. Among the most notorious were the labour battalions of the army, to which all able-bodied men found socially or politically insecure or guilty of having their families abroad were drafted. It is estimated that roughly 200,000 men were forced to work in these labour camps in hazardous conditions, often in quarries, coal mines, and uranium mines, and 1,000 died in their first days of "labour", while tens of thousands became crippled. Other groups targeted by these repressive measures were former soldiers of the pre-war Polish Army as well as the wartime underground Home Army.

In the June 1956 Poznań protests against local working conditions and living standards, as well as the Soviet influence over Poland, Rokossovsky approved an order to send in military units. As a result of this over 10,000 soldiers and 360 tanks crushed the protesters, and at least 74 civilians were killed. Other estimates of the death toll range from nearly 60, given by Britannica, to more than 90, given by the historian Jan C. Behrends.

In the wake of the Poznań riots and the "rehabilitation" of the formerly imprisoned communist reformer Władysław Gomułka in 1956, according to the Polish weekly Wprost, Rokossovsky went to Moscow in a failed attempt to persuade Nikita Khrushchev to use force against the Polish state. During the Polish October of 1956, he ordered some Polish units out of their barracks in support of the Soviet Northern Group of Forces. Protesters demanded his resignation and burned his portraits. He was removed from the Politburo on 21 October 1956. However, Gomułka managed to negotiate with the Soviets, and on the new Polish First Secretary's insistence Rokossovsky was forced to leave Poland. Britannica states that Gomułka expelled him on 28 October 1956 on charges of attempting a pro-Soviet coup. He was formally replaced as minister on 13 November 1956, and he declined an offer of permanent residence in Poland.

Rokossovsky returned to the Soviet Union, which restored his Soviet ranks and honours, and in November 1956 he was appointed a Deputy Minister of Defence and Chief Inspector of the Ministry of Defence. In October 1957, he was made commander of the Transcaucasian Military District. According to Krugosvet, he was removed from his Moscow posts after speaking at the Central Committee plenum that dismissed Defence Minister Zhukov, and was restored to them in January 1958. He became a candidate member of the Central Committee of the CPSU in 1961. He remained Deputy Minister of Defence and Chief Inspector until April 1962, when he was transferred to the Group of General Inspectors of the Ministry of Defence. Vechernyaya Moskva reports that Khrushchev forced him into retirement after he refused to write an article denouncing Stalin.

Throughout his life, he was fond of hunting – he had a double-barreled IZh-49 12 gauge shotgun and a 20 gauge double-barreled TOZ shotgun made in 1905.

Rokossovsky died on 3 August 1968, of prostate cancer in Moscow, aged 71. His ashes were buried in the Kremlin Wall Necropolis on Red Square. His memoir, Soldatskiy dolg (A Soldier's Duty), was published in several editions, including in 1980 and 2002. In 2015, Russian Prime Minister Dmitry Medvedev unveiled a monument to Rokossovsky in Moscow.

== Dates of rank ==
- promoted major general, 4 June 1940
- promoted lieutenant general, 14 July 1941
- promoted colonel general, 15 January 1943
- promoted army general, 28 April 1943
- promoted Marshal of the Soviet Union, 29 June 1944
- declared Marshal of Poland, 6 November 1949

== Family ==
Rokossovsky and his wife Julia had a daughter named Ariadna (1925–1978). During World War II, he met military doctor Galina Talanova, with whom he had an illegitimate daughter named Nadezhda (born 1945).

Rokossovsky's great-granddaughter Ariadna Rokossovskaya (born 1980) works as a journalist for the Russian newspaper Rossiyskaya Gazeta.

== Honours and awards ==
- Russian Empire:
  - Cross of St. George, 4th class
  - Medal of St. George, 2nd, 3rd and 4th class
- Soviet Union:
  - "Gold Star" Hero of the Soviet Union, twice (29 July 1944, 1 June 1945)
  - Order of Victory (No. 4 – 30 March 1945)
  - Seven Orders of Lenin (16 August 1936, 2 January 1942, 29 July 1944, 21 February 1945, 26 December 1946, 20 December 1956, 20 December 1966)
  - Order of the October Revolution (22 February 1968)
  - Order of the Red Banner, six times (23 May 1920, 2 December 1921, 22 February 1930, 22 July 1941, 3 November 1944, 6 November 1947)
  - Order of Suvorov, 1st class (28 January 1943)
  - Order of Kutuzov, 1st class (27 August 1943)
  - Medal "For the Defence of Stalingrad" (22 December 1942)
  - Medal "For the Defence of Moscow" (1 May 1944)
  - Medal "For the Defence of Kiev" (21 June 1961)
  - Medal "For the Liberation of Warsaw" (9 June 1945)
  - Medal "For the Capture of Königsberg" (9 June 1945)
  - Medal "For the Capture of Berlin" (9 June 1945)
  - Medal "For the Victory over Germany in the Great Patriotic War 1941–1945" (9 May 1945)
  - Jubilee Medal "Twenty Years of Victory in the Great Patriotic War 1941-1945" (7 May 1965)
  - Jubilee Medal "XX Years of the Workers' and Peasants' Red Army" (22 February 1938)
  - Jubilee Medal "30 Years of the Soviet Army and Navy" (22 February 1948)
  - Jubilee Medal "40 Years of the Armed Forces of the USSR" (18 December 1957)
  - Jubilee Medal "50 Years of the Armed Forces of the USSR" (26 December 1967)
  - Medal "In Commemoration of the 800th Anniversary of Moscow"
  - Honorary weapon – sword inscribed with golden national emblem of the Soviet Union (1968)
- Polish People's Republic:
  - Order of the Builders of People's Poland (1951)
  - Order of the Cross of Grunwald, 1st class (1945)
  - Grand Cross of the Virtuti Militari (1945)
  - Medal "For Warsaw 1939-1945" (1946)
  - Medal "For Oder, Neisse and the Baltic" (1946)
  - Medal of Victory and Freedom 1945 (1946)
- China:
  - Medal of Sino-Soviet Friendship (1956)
- Denmark:
  - King Christian X's Liberty Medal (1947)
- France:
  - Grand Officer of the Legion d'Honneur (9 June 1945)
  - Croix de guerre (1945)
- Mongolian People's Republic:
  - Order of Sukhbaatar (18 March 1961)
  - Order of the Red Banner (1943)
  - Order of Friendship (1967)
- United Kingdom:
  - Honorary Knight-Commander of the Order of the Bath, (military division) (1945)
- United States:
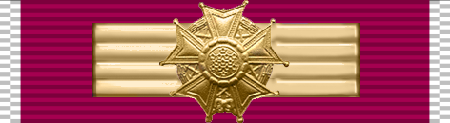
  - Chief Commander of the Legion of Merit (1946)

== Monuments and Memorial ==
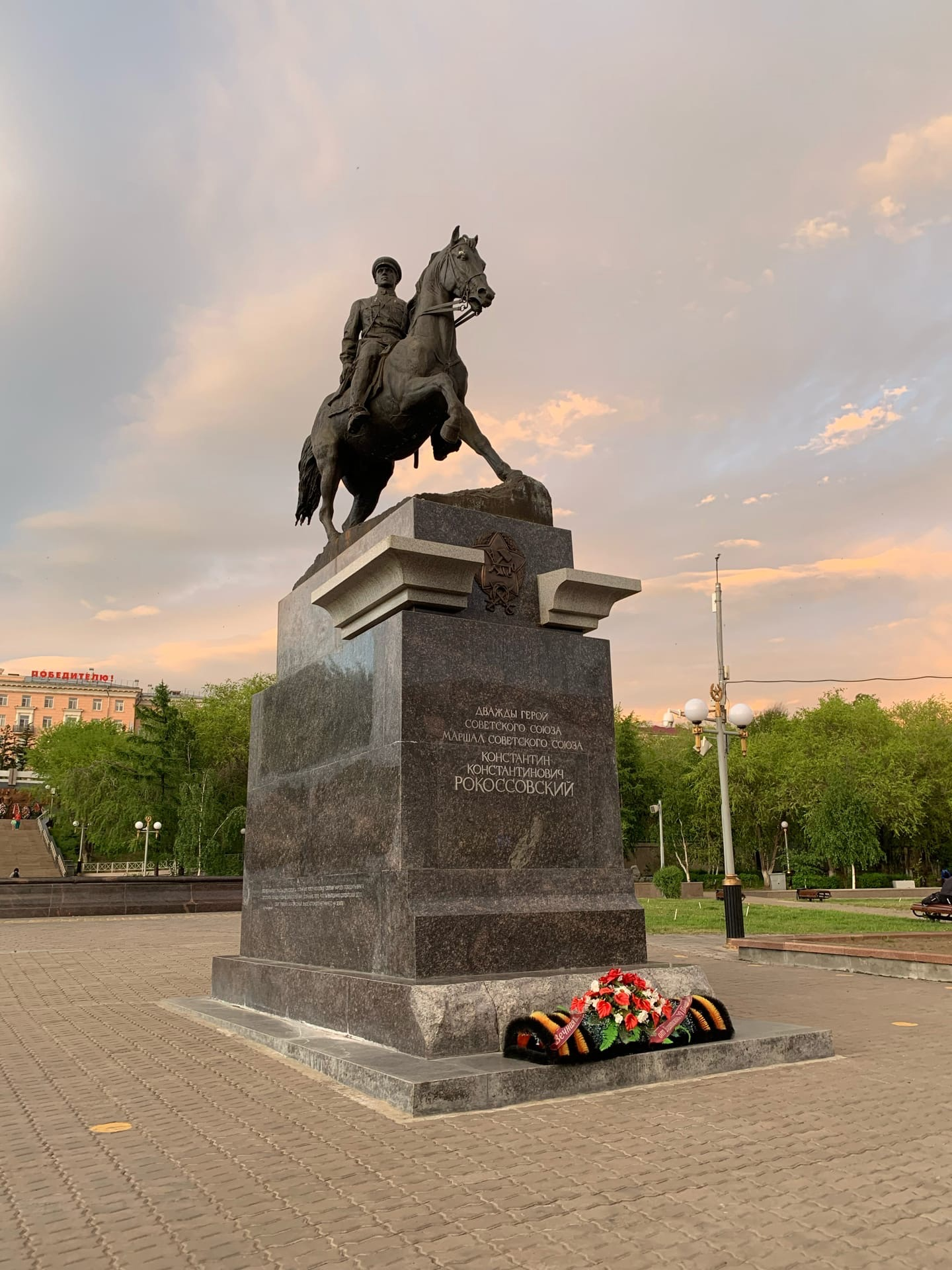
Monument to Marshal of the Soviet Union Konstantin Rokossovsky in Ulan-Ude, Russia

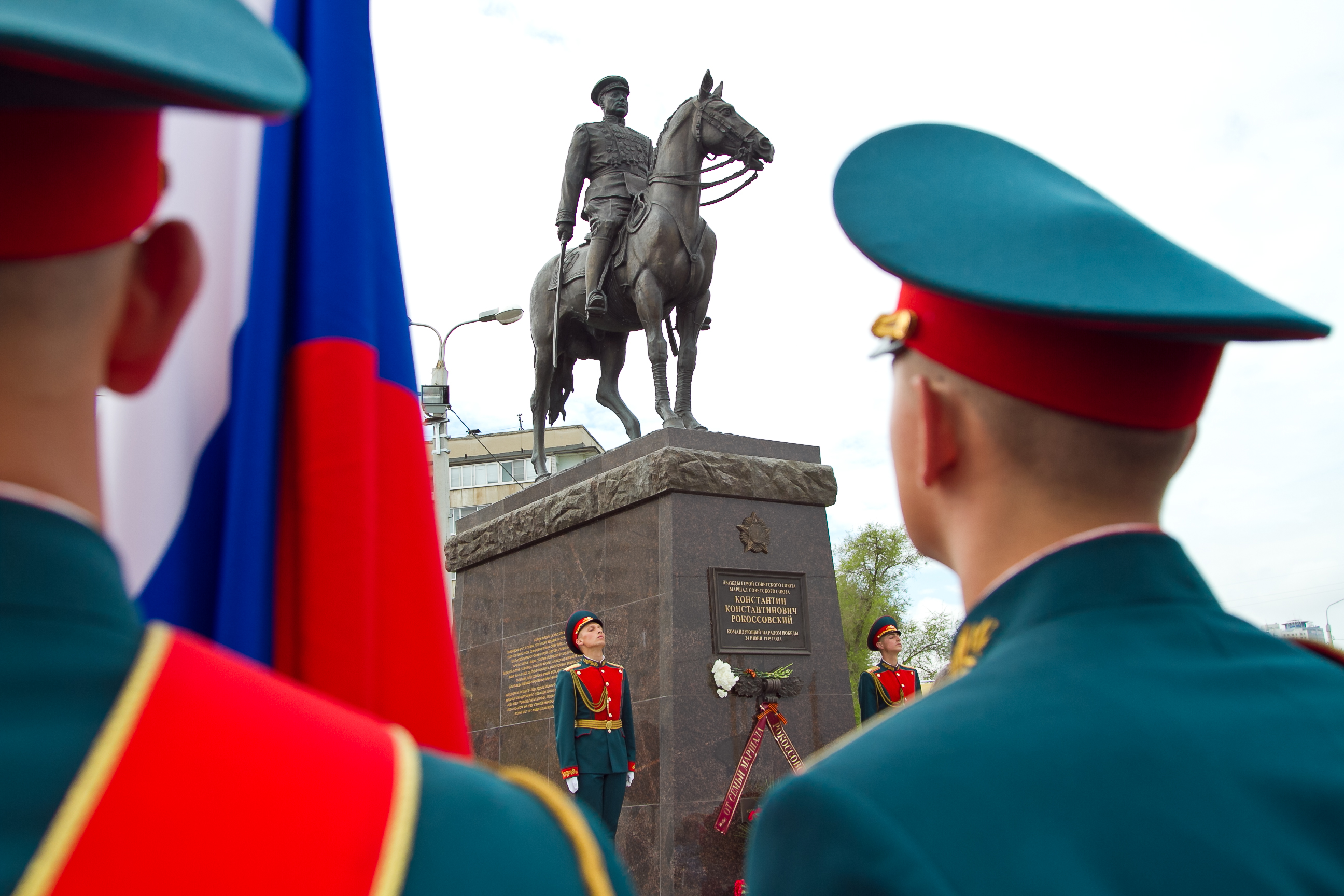
Monuments to Rokossovsky in Volgograd

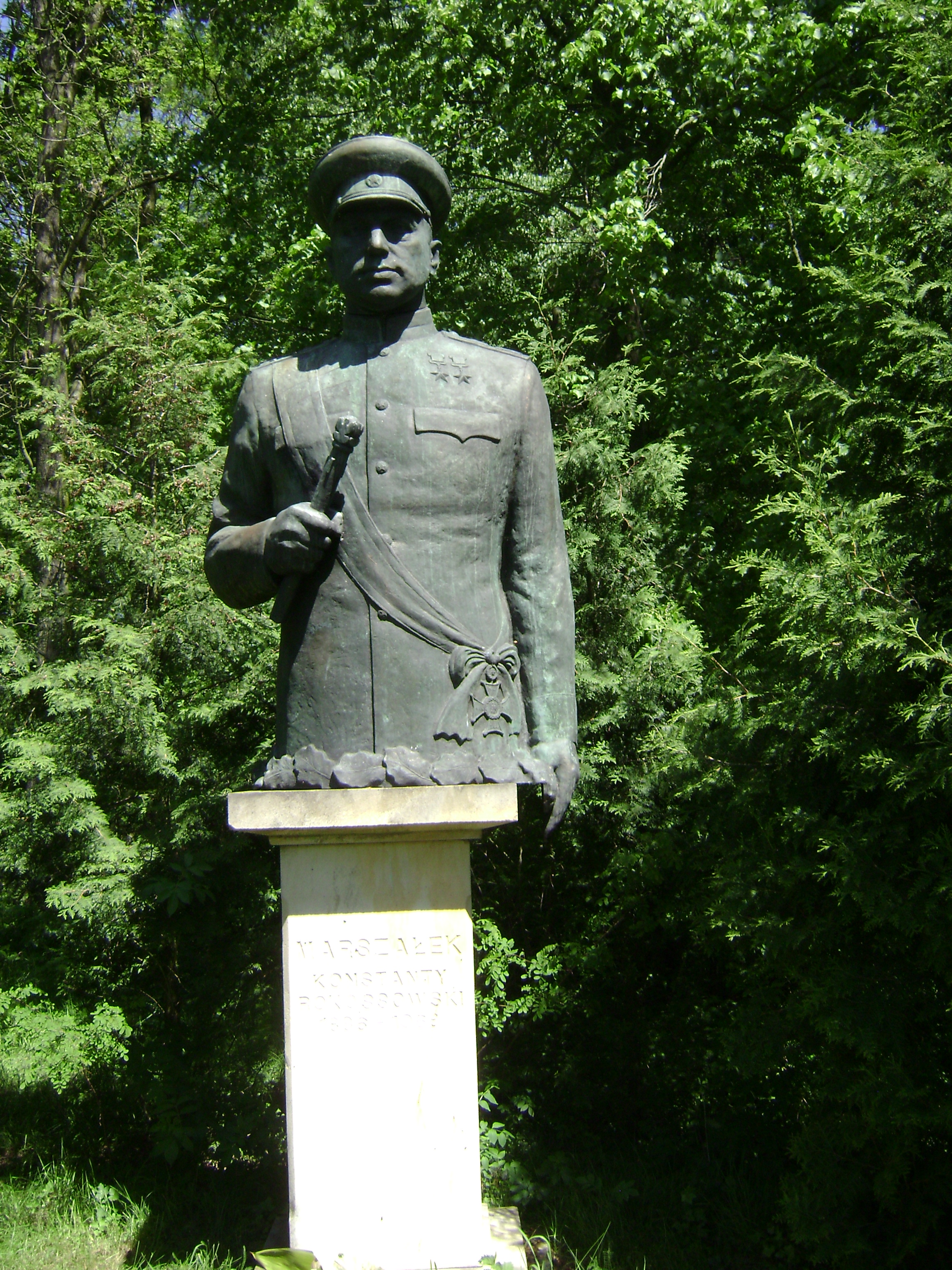
Monument to Rokossovsky in Soviet Army and Polish People's Army Museum in Uniejowice, Poland

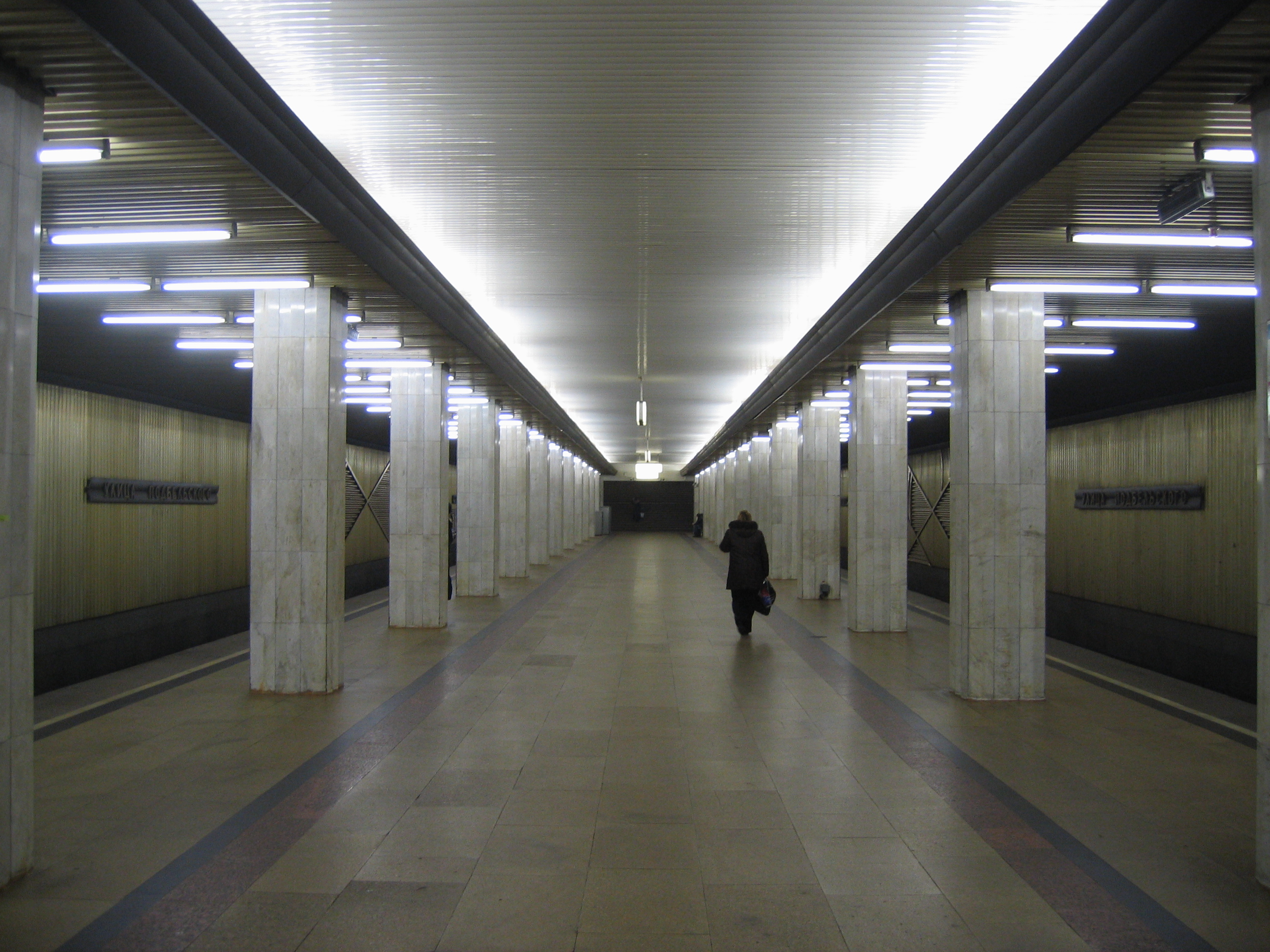
Bulvar Rokossovskogo, Moscow Metro station

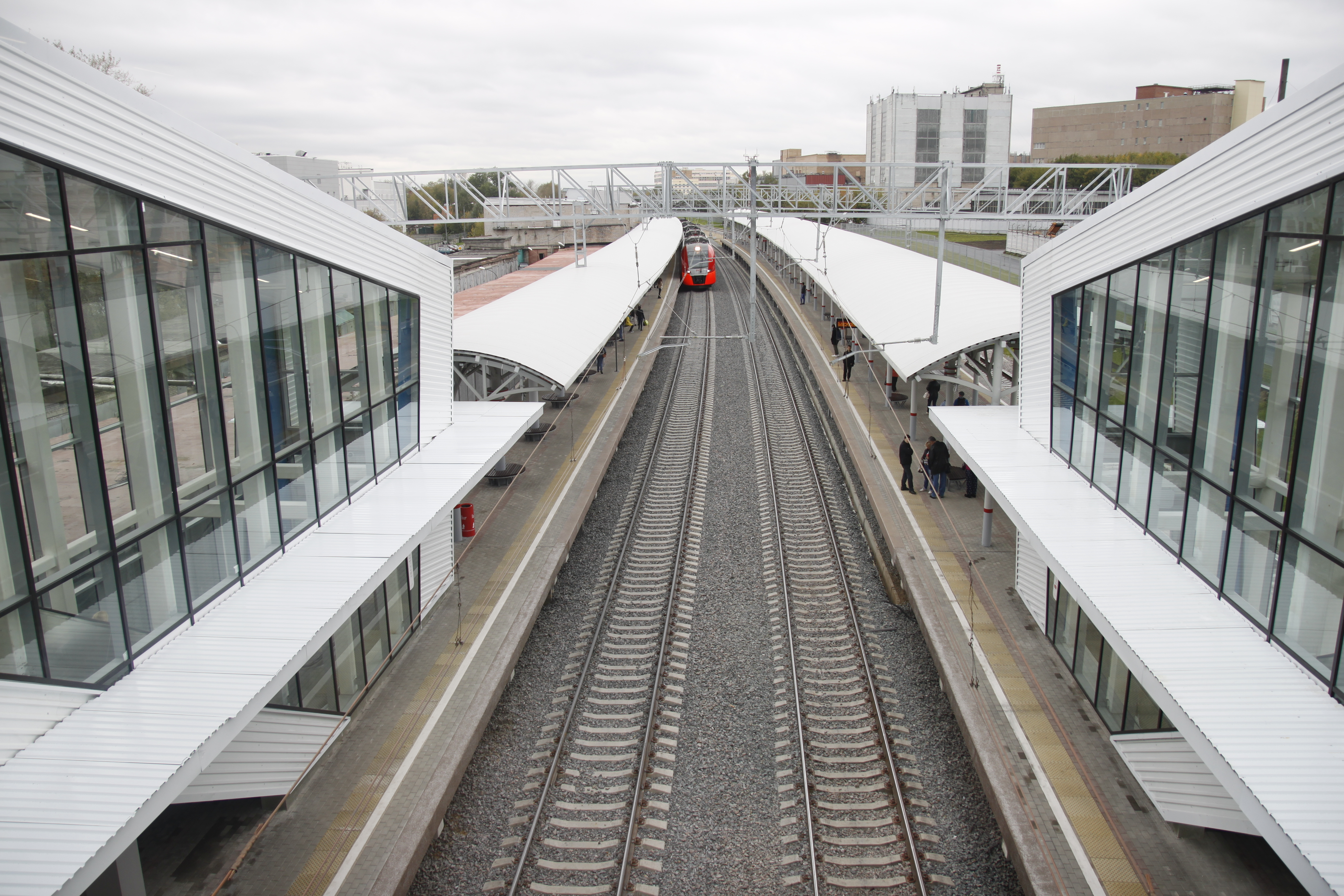
Bulvar Rokossovskogo, Moscow Central Circle station.

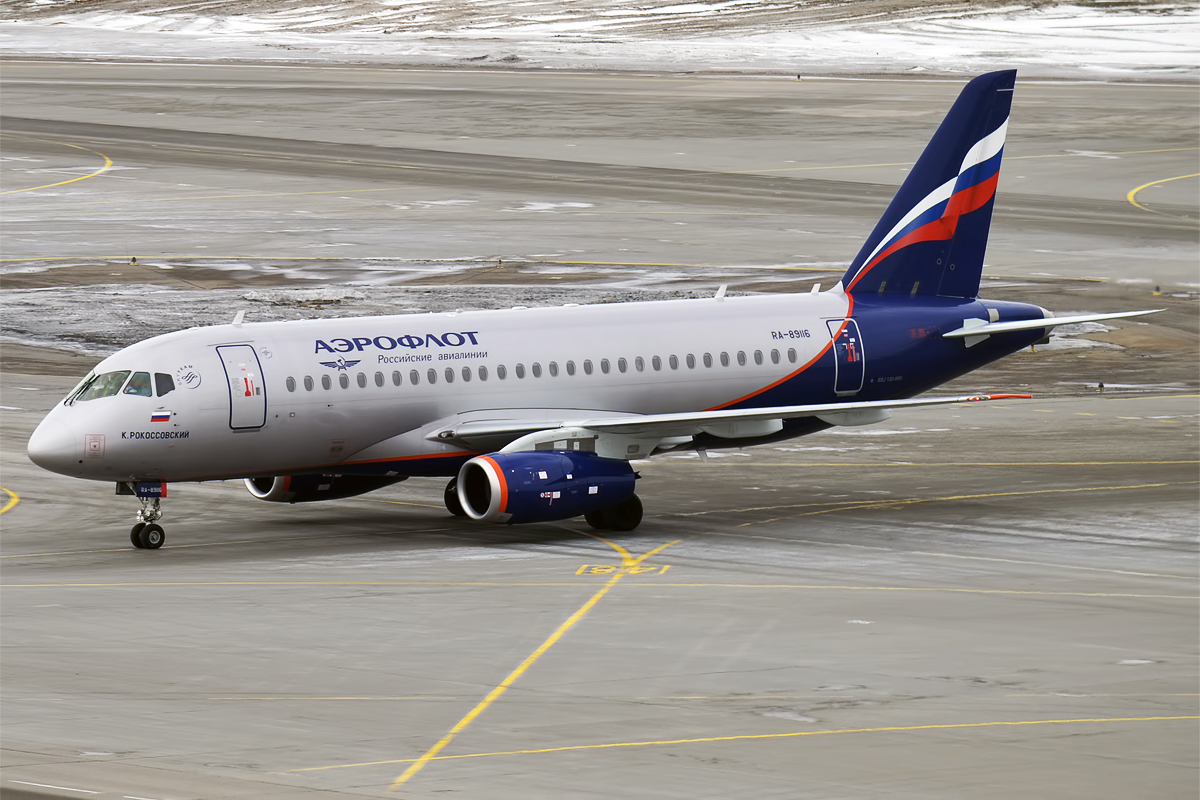
Aeroflot, Sukhoi Superjet 100, RA-89116 ('K. Rokossovsky').

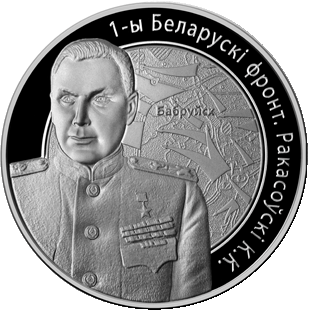
Commemorative coin of Belarus, 2010.

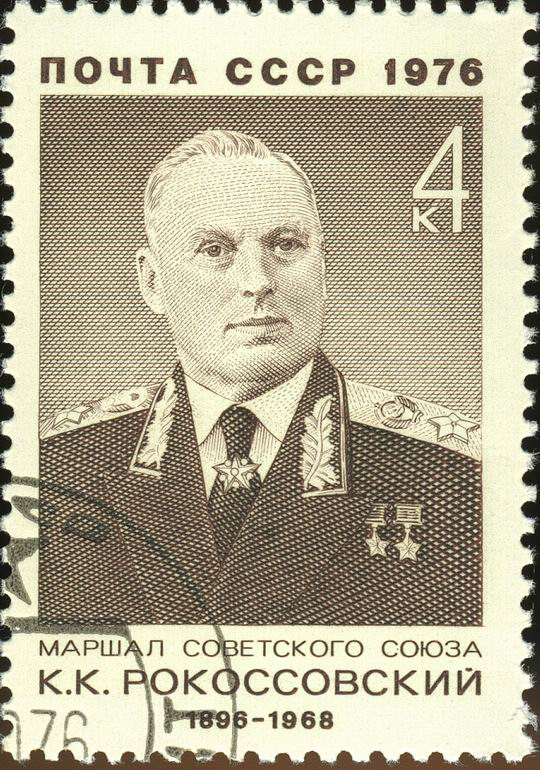
Postage stamp of Soviet Union, 1976.

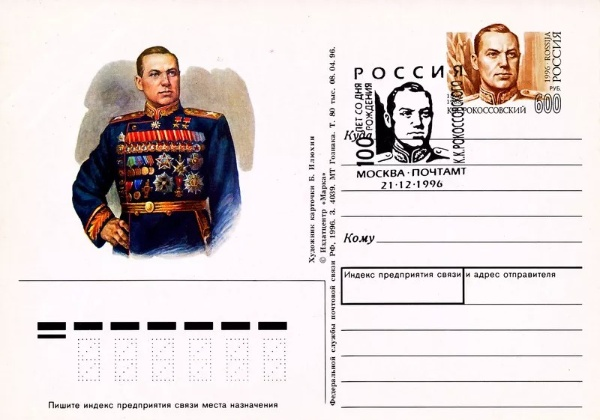
Postal cover of Russia, 1996.

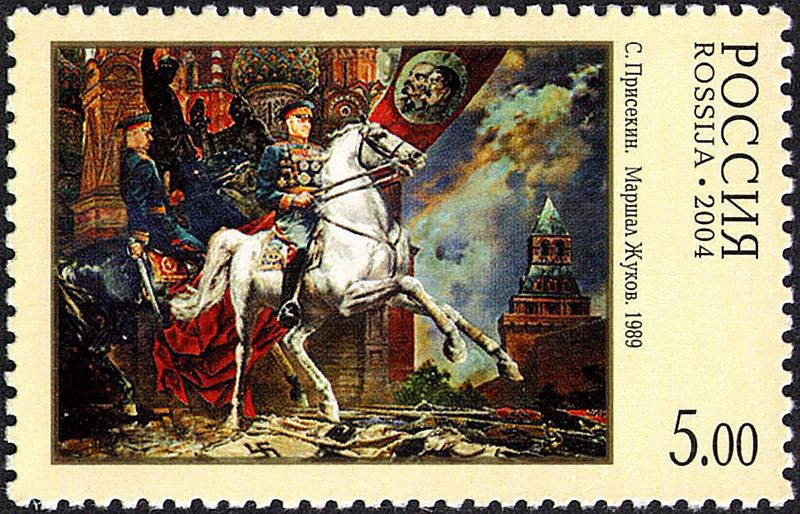
Postage stamp of Russia, 2004.

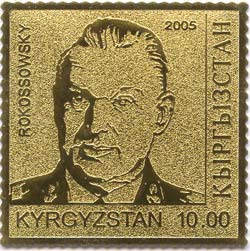
Postage stamp of Kyrgyzstan, 2005.

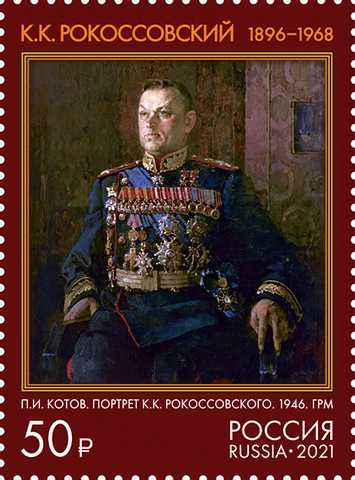
Postage stamp of Russia, 2021.

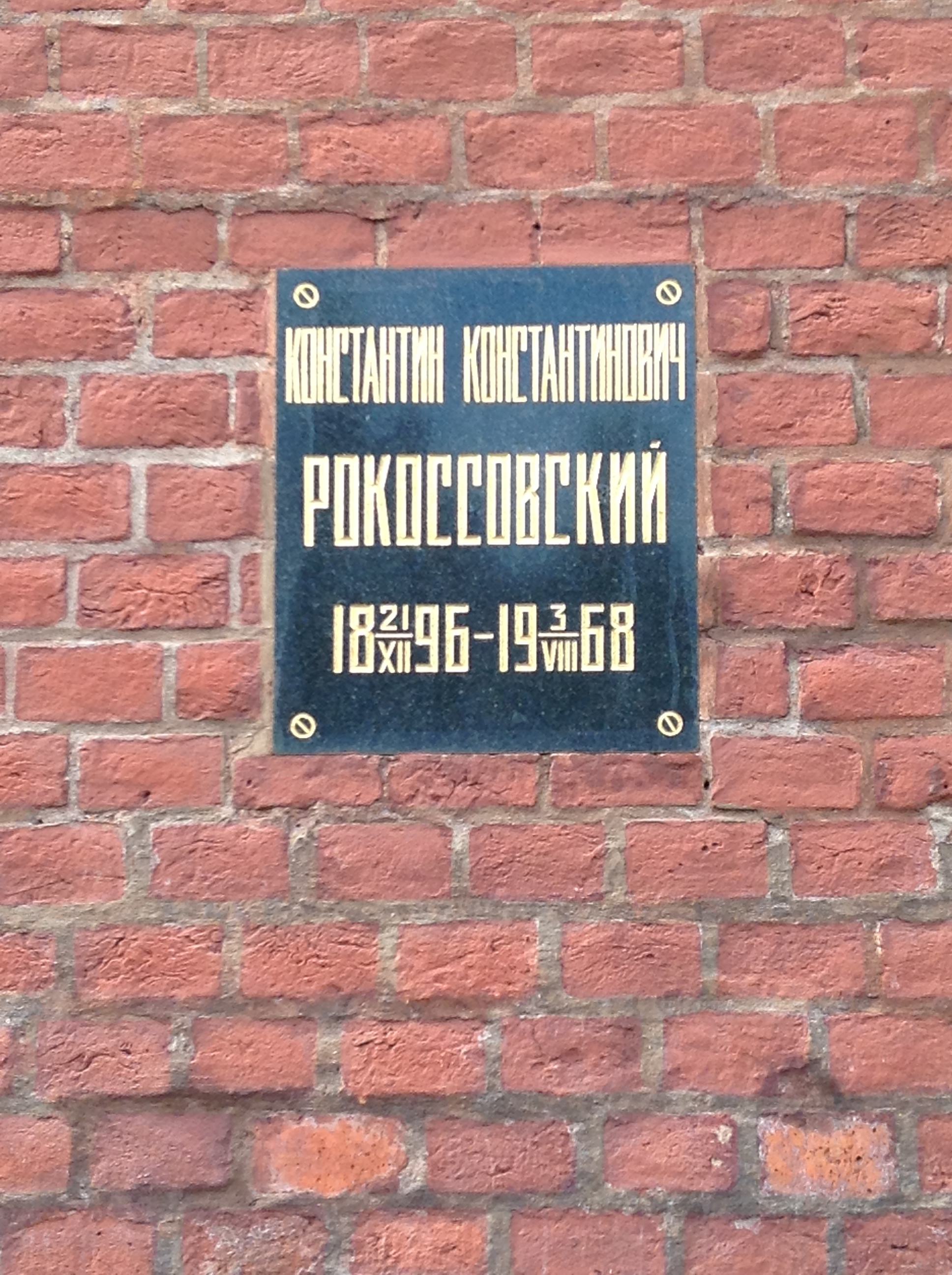
Rokossovsky's tomb in the Kremlin Wall Necropolis

== Cited sources ==
- Beevor, Antony (1998). Stalingrad: The Fateful Siege. Artemis Cooper. ISBN 0-14-024985-0.
- Glantz, David (2010). Barbarossa Derailed. Casemate Publishers. ISBN 978-1906033729.
