= Radziechów =

Radziechów may refer to the following places:

- Radziechów, Lower Silesian Voivodeship in Gmina Zagrodno, Złotoryja County in Lower Silesian Voivodeship (SW Poland)
- Radekhiv (Polish: Radziechów), a city in Lviv Oblast of Ukraine
- Radekhiv (Polish: Radziechów), a village in Liuboml Raion in Volyn Oblast of Ukraine
