= Jadwisin, Lower Silesian Voivodeship =

Jadwisin
- Village
- Location within Poland
- Coordinates: 51°14′46″N 15°51′10″E
- Country: Poland
- Voivodeship: Lower Silesian
- County: Złotoryja
- Gmina: Zagrodno
- Population: 150

Jadwisin [jadˈviɕin] is a village in the administrative district of Gmina Zagrodno, within Złotoryja County, Lower Silesian Voivodeship, in south-western Poland.
