= Modlikowice =

- Village
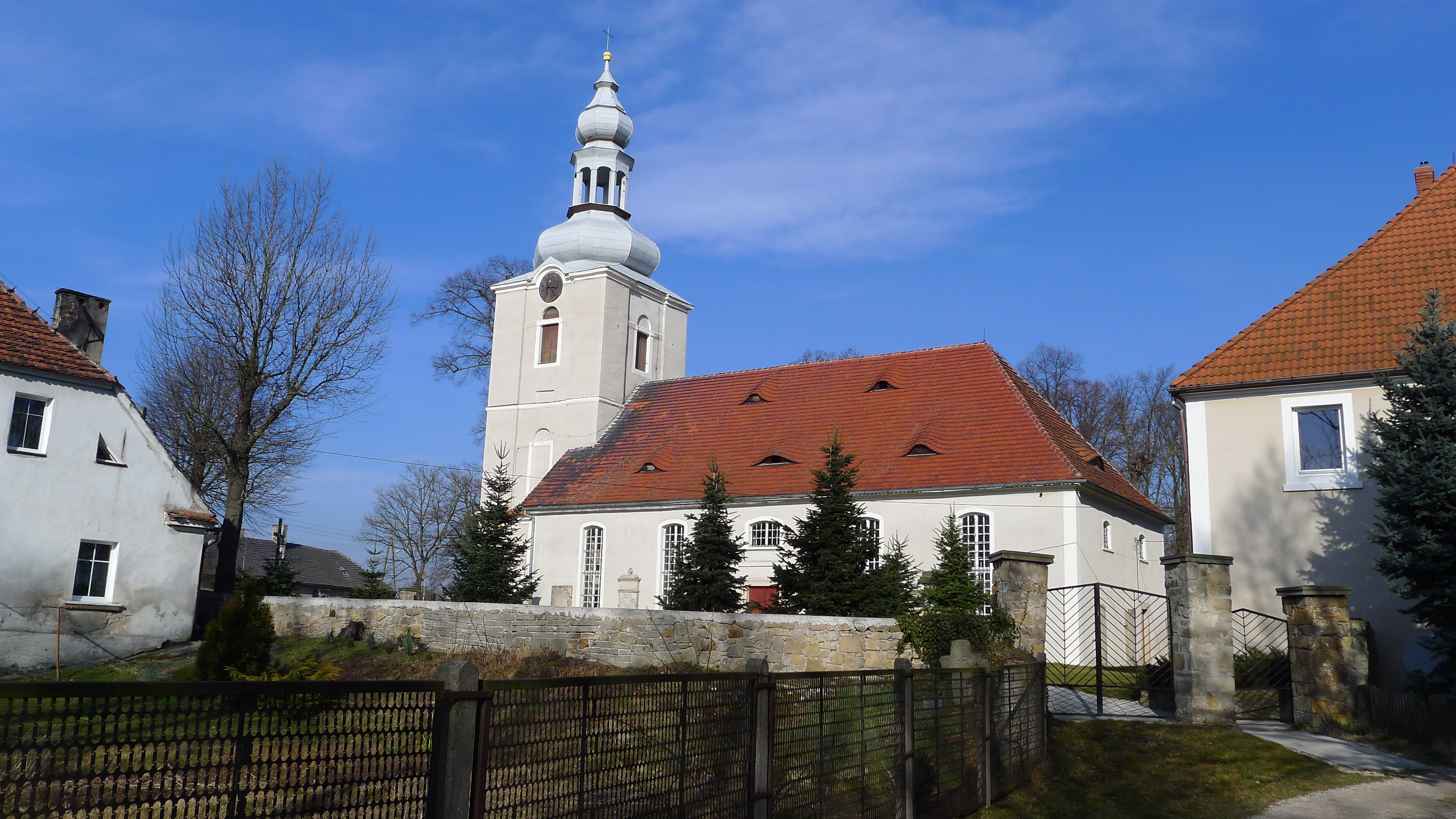
- Church of Our Lady of Częstochowa

- Location within Poland
- Coordinates: 51°13′N 15°50′E
- Country: Poland
- Voivodeship: Lower Silesian
- County: Złotoryja
- Gmina: Zagrodno

Modlikowice [mɔdlikɔˈvit͡sɛ] is a village in the administrative district of Gmina Zagrodno, within Złotoryja County, Lower Silesian Voivodeship, in south-western Poland.
