= Gmina Zagrodno =

Gmina Zagrodno Zagrodno Commune
- Gmina
- Coat of arms
- Interactive map of Gmina Zagrodno
- Coordinates (Zagrodno): 51°11′N 15°52′E
- Country: Poland
- Voivodeship: Lower Silesian
- County: Złotoryja
- Seat: Zagrodno
- Sołectwos: Brochocin, Grodziec, Jadwisin, Łukaszów, Modlikowice, Olszanica, Radziechów, Uniejowice, Wojciechów, Zagrodno

Area
  - Total: 122.09 km^{2} (47.14 sq mi)

Population (2019-06-30)
  - Total: 5,294
  - Density: 43.36/km^{2} (112.3/sq mi)
- Website: https://zagrodno.info

Gmina Zagrodno is a rural gmina (administrative district) in Złotoryja County, Lower Silesian Voivodeship, in south-western Poland. Its seat is the village of Zagrodno, which lies approximately 7 kilometres (4 mi) north-west of Złotoryja, and 83 kilometres (52 mi) west of the regional capital Wrocław.

The gmina covers an area of 122.09 square kilometres (47.1 sq mi), and as of 2019 its total population is 5,294.

== Neighbouring gminas ==
Gmina Zagrodno is bordered by the gminas of Chojnów, Pielgrzymka, Warta Bolesławiecka and Złotoryja.

== Villages ==
The gmina contains the villages of Brochocin, Grodziec, Jadwisin, Łukaszów, Modlikowice, Olszanica, Radziechów, Uniejowice, Wojciechów and Zagrodno.
