= Grodziec, Lower Silesian Voivodeship =

Grodziec
- Village
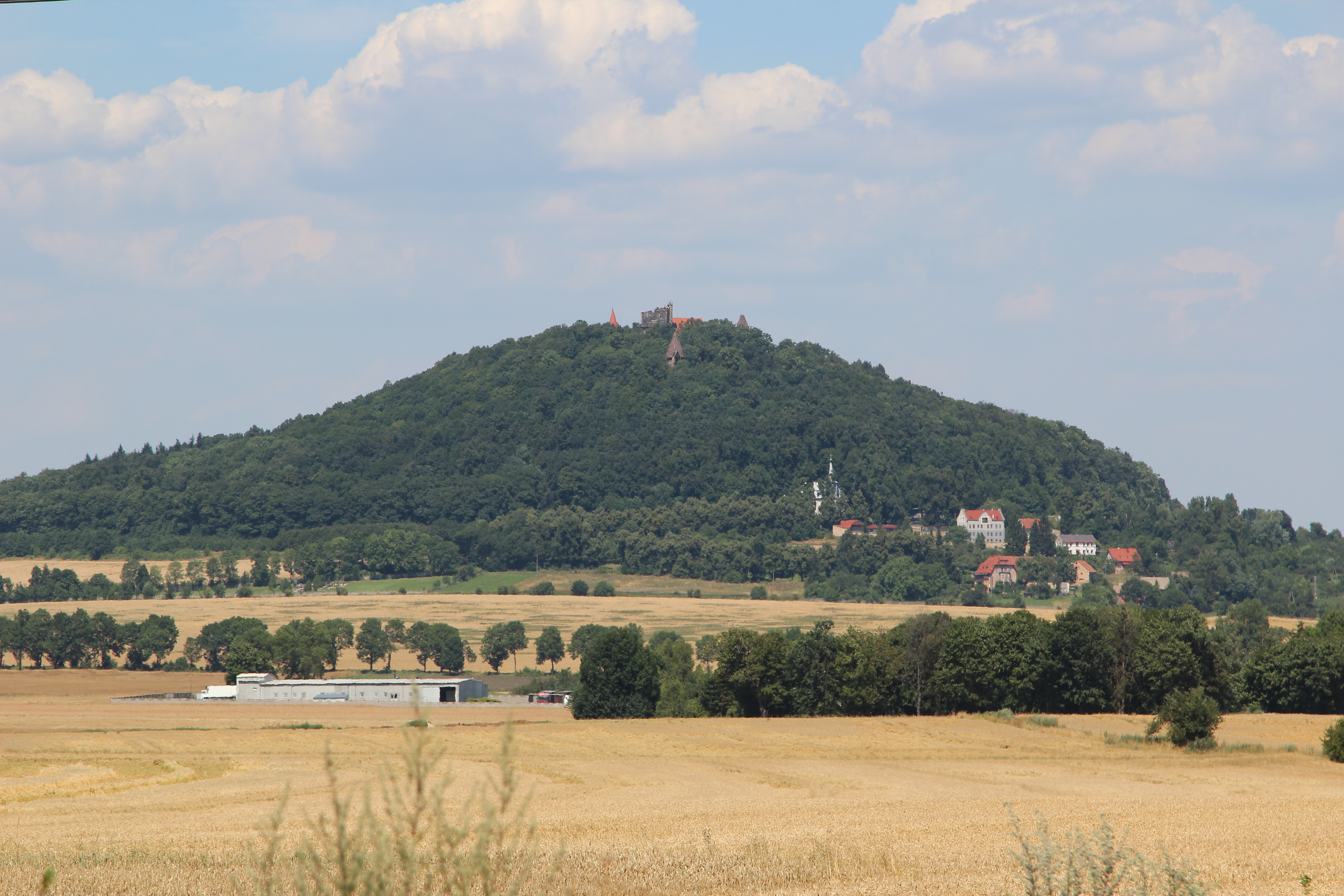
- Grodziec Castle and the village

- Location within Poland
- Coordinates: 51°10′12″N 15°47′09″E
- Country: Poland
- Voivodeship: Lower Silesian
- County: Złotoryja
- Gmina: Zagrodno
- Population: 520

Grodziec [ˈɡrɔd͡ʑɛt͡s] (German: Gröditzberg) is a village in the administrative district of Gmina Zagrodno, within Złotoryja County, Lower Silesian Voivodeship, in south-western Poland.

Grodziec Castle is located in the village.
