= Brochocin, Złotoryja County =

Brochocin
- Village
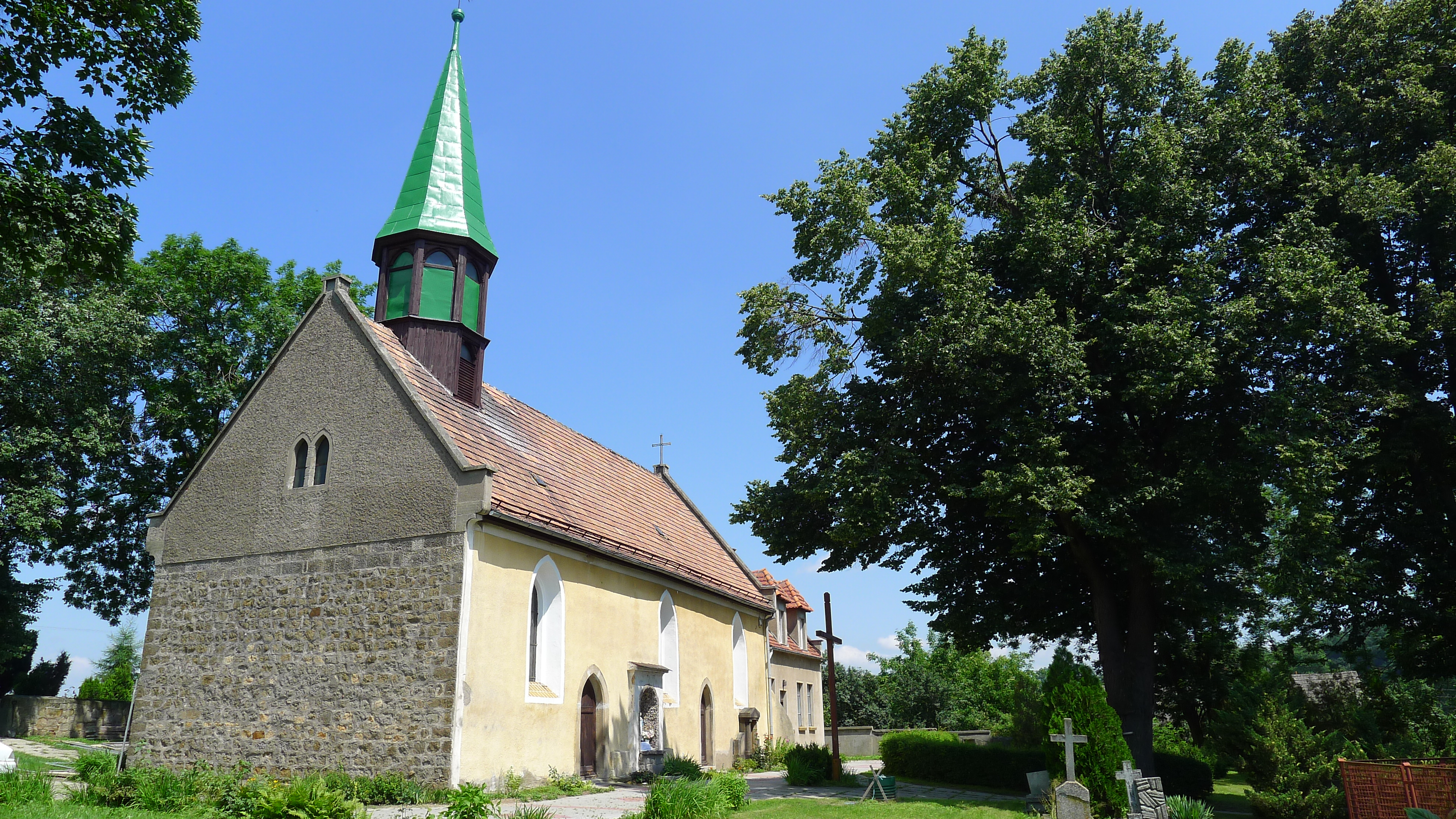
- Church of Our Lady of Sorrows

- Location within Poland
- Coordinates: 51°12′41″N 15°55′56″E
- Country: Poland
- Voivodeship: Lower Silesian
- County: Złotoryja
- Gmina: Zagrodno

Brochocin [brɔˈxɔt͡ɕin] is a village in the administrative district of Gmina Zagrodno, within Złotoryja County, Lower Silesian Voivodeship, in south-western Poland.
