= Zagrodno =

- Village
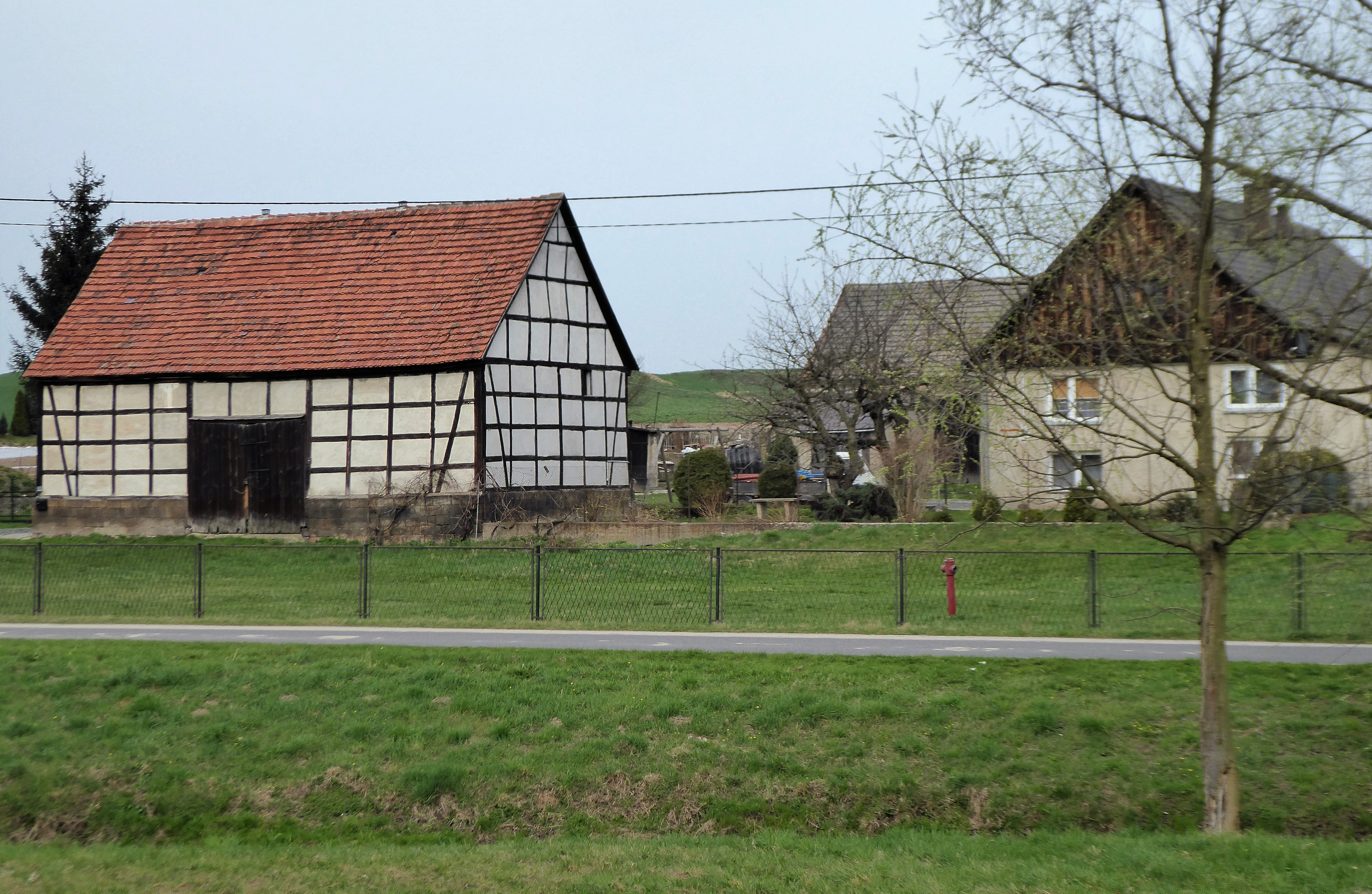

- Location within Poland
- Coordinates: 51°11′N 15°52′E
- Country: Poland
- Voivodeship: Lower Silesian
- County: Złotoryja
- Gmina: Zagrodno

Zagrodno [zaˈɡrɔdnɔ] is a village in Złotoryja County, Lower Silesian Voivodeship, in south-western Poland. It is the seat of the administrative district (gmina) called Gmina Zagrodno.
