= Hermann Theodor Hettner =

German literary historian and museum director

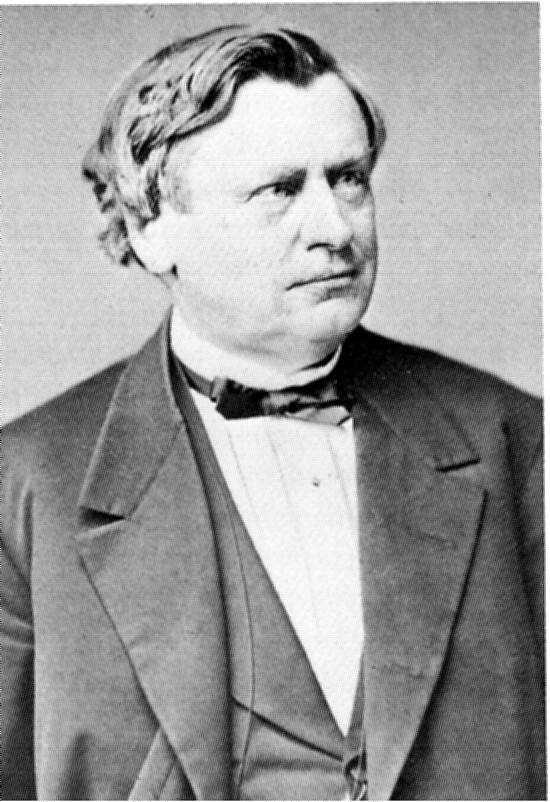
1870 photo of Hermann Theodor Hettner

Hermann Julius Theodor Hettner (March 12, 1821 – May 29, 1882), was a German literary historian and museum director.

== Biography ==
He was born at Leisersdorf (Uniejowice), near Goldberg (Złotoryja), in Silesia. At the universities of Berlin, Halle and Heidelberg he concentrated on the study of philosophy, but in 1843 turned his attention to aesthetics, art and literature. In order to progress with these studies, he spent three years in Italy, and, on his return, published a Vorschule zur bildenden Kunst der Alten (1848) and an essay on Die neapolitanischen Malerschulen.

He became Privatdozent for aesthetics and the history of art at Heidelberg in 1847 where he associated he became acquainted with the philosopher Ludwig Feuerbach, the Dutch scientist Jacob Moleschott and the Swiss poet Gottfried Keller. While at Heidelberg, Hettner married Marie von Stockmar, daughter of statesman Christian Friedrich, Baron Stockmar. From this marriage, three children emerged, including the German archaeologist Felix Hettner.

After the publication of his volume Die romantische Schule in ihrem Zusammenhang mit Goethe und Schiller (1850), Hettner accepted a call as professor to the University of Jena where he lectured on the history of both art and literature. There he produced the book Das moderne Drama (1852). This work, which was shaped by correspondence with Keller, was greatly influential on major 19th-century Norwegian playwright Henrik Ibsen who read it shortly after its publication during a trip to Copenhagen and Dresden. Hettner's argument for the psychological treatment of character being most important as a model for contemporary plays was one of the formative experiences in Ibsen's career.

In 1855 Hettner was appointed director of the royal collections of antiquities and the museum of plaster casts at Dresden, to which posts were subsequently added that of director of the historical museum and a professorship at the Royal Saxon Polytechnic. He remained there until his death.

Hettner's chief work is his Literaturgeschichte des achtzehnten Jahrhunderts ("Literary History of the 18th century"), which appeared in three parts, devoted respectively to English, French and German literature, between 1856 and 1870. The series was regarded as "comprehensive and discriminating", with the third part being republished in multiple editions until 1961. Although to some extent influenced by the political and literary theories of the Hegelian school, which, since Hettner's day have fallen into discredit, and at times losing sight of the main issues of literary development over questions of social evolution, this work is one of the most highly regarded histories of 18th century German literature.

Hettner's other works include Griechische Reiseskizzen ("Greek Travel Sketches") (1853), Italienische Studien (1879) and several works descriptive of the Dresden art collections. His Kleine Schriften were collected and published in 1884.

== Works ==
- Vorschule zur bildenden Kunst der Alten (1848)
- Die romantische Schule in ihrem inneren zusammenhange mit Göthe und Schiller (1850)
- Das moderne Drama: Aesthetische Untersuchungen (1852)
- Griechische Reiseskizzen (1853)
- Robinson und die Robinsonaden (1854)
- Die Bildwerke der Königlichen Antikensammlung zu Dresden (1856)
- Literaturgeschichte des achtzehnten Jahrhunderts (1856 to 1870)
  - Part 1 – Geschichte der englischen Literatur von der Wiederherstellung des Königthums bis in die zweite Hälfte des achtzehnten Jahrhunderts, 1660-1770 (1856)
  - Part 2 – Geschichte der französischen Literatur im achtzehnten Jahrhundert (1860)
  - Part 3 – Geschichte der deutschen Literatur im achtzehnten Jahrhundert, Buch 1 (1862)
  - Part 3 – Geschichte der deutschen Literatur im achtzehnten Jahrhundert, Buch 2 (1864)
  - Part 3 – Geschichte der deutschen Literatur im achtzehnten Jahrhundert, Buch 3 (1869/70) 2 vo.
  - Part 3 – Goethe und Schiller: Separatabdruch aus H. Hettner’s Literaturgeschichte des achtzehnten Jahrhunderts (1870) 2 vo.
- Italienische Studien: zur Geschichte der Renaissance (1879)
- Kleine Schriftenl (1884)
