= Łukaszów, Lower Silesian Voivodeship =

Łukaszów
- Village
- Location within Poland
- Coordinates: 51°11′N 15°56′E
- Country: Poland
- Voivodeship: Lower Silesian
- County: Złotoryja
- Gmina: Zagrodno

Łukaszów [wuˈkaʂuf] is a village in the administrative district of Gmina Zagrodno, within Złotoryja County, Lower Silesian Voivodeship, in south-western Poland.
