= Wojciechów, Złotoryja County =

Wojciechów
- Village
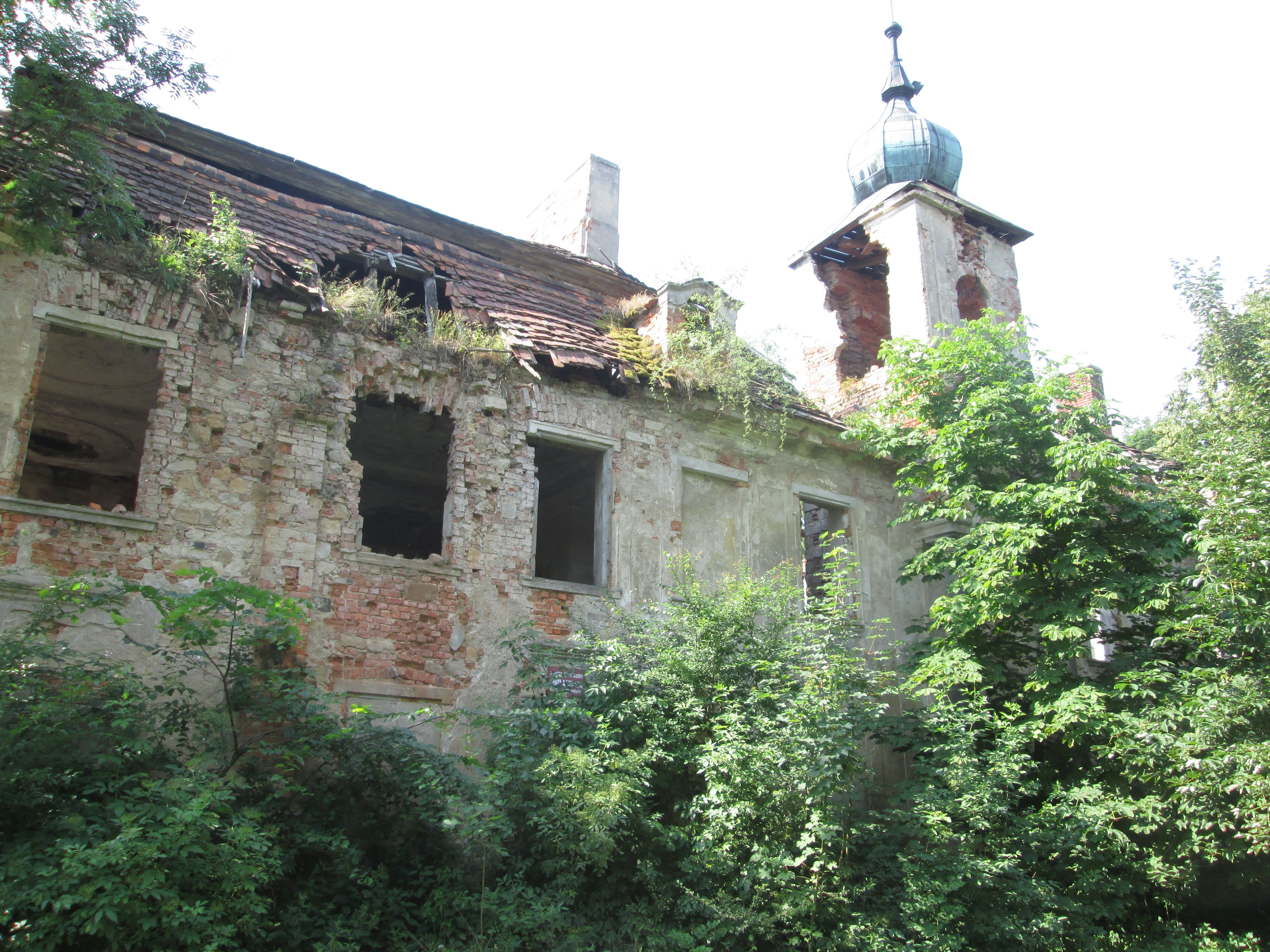
- Palace

- Location within Poland
- Coordinates: 51°13′51″N 15°53′56″E
- Country: Poland
- Voivodeship: Lower Silesian
- County: Złotoryja
- Gmina: Zagrodno

Wojciechów (Polish: [vɔjˈt͡ɕɛxuf]) is a village in the administrative district of Gmina Zagrodno, within Złotoryja County, Lower Silesian Voivodeship, in south-western Poland.
