= Radziechów, Lower Silesian Voivodeship =

Radziechów
- Village
- Location within Poland
- Coordinates: 51°14′N 15°49′E
- Country: Poland
- Voivodeship: Lower Silesian
- County: Złotoryja
- Gmina: Zagrodno

Population
  - Total: 560

Radziechów [raˈd͡ʑɛxuf] is a village in the administrative district of Gmina Zagrodno, within Złotoryja County, Lower Silesian Voivodeship, in south-western Poland.
