= Uniejowice =

- Village
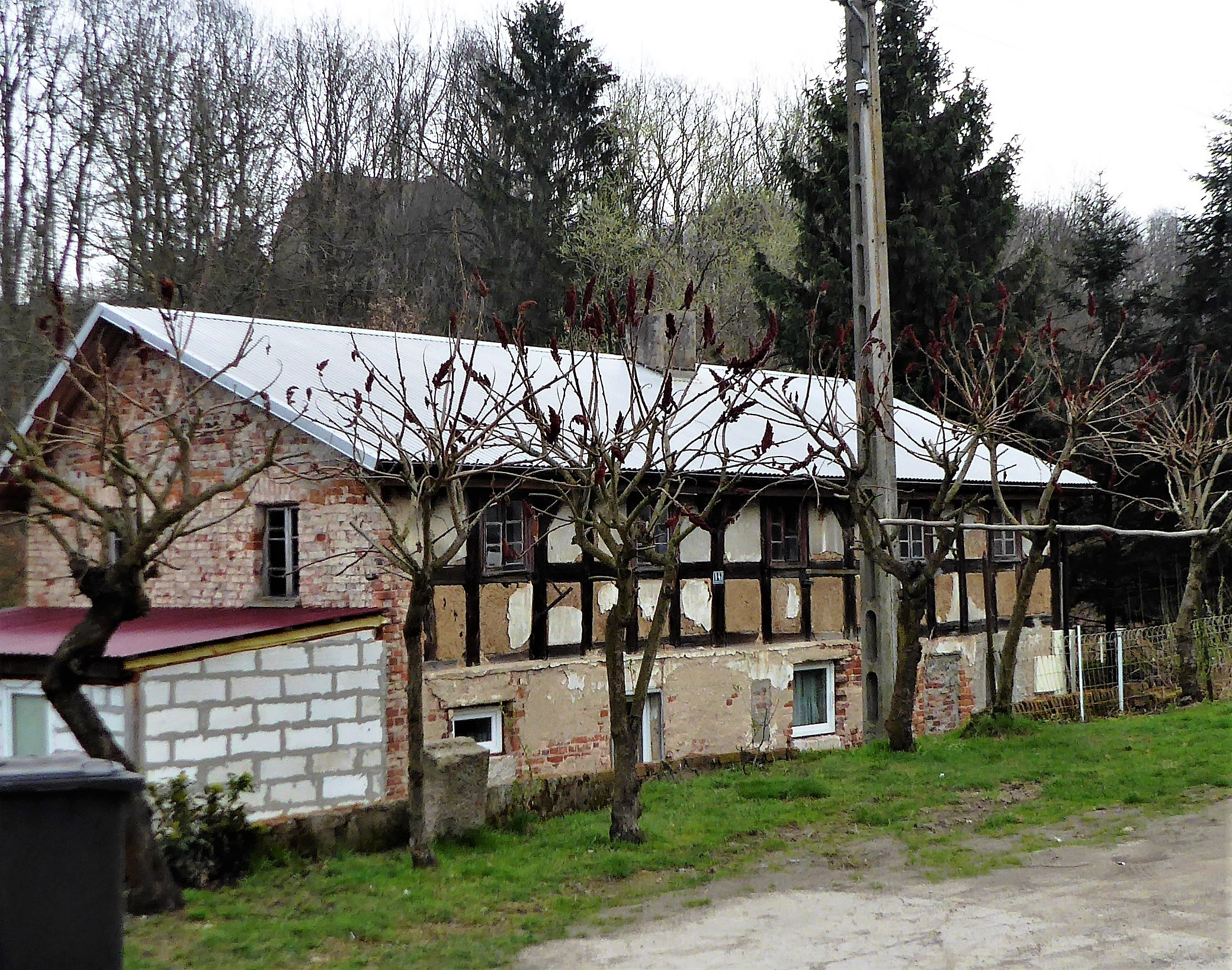

- Location within Poland
- Coordinates: 51°10′N 15°51′E
- Country: Poland
- Voivodeship: Lower Silesian
- County: Złotoryja
- Gmina: Zagrodno

Uniejowice [uɲɛjɔˈvit͡sɛ] is a village in the administrative district of Gmina Zagrodno, within Złotoryja County, Lower Silesian Voivodeship, in south-western Poland.

== People ==
- Hermann Theodor Hettner (1821–1882)
