= Olszanica, Lower Silesian Voivodeship =

Olszanica
- Village
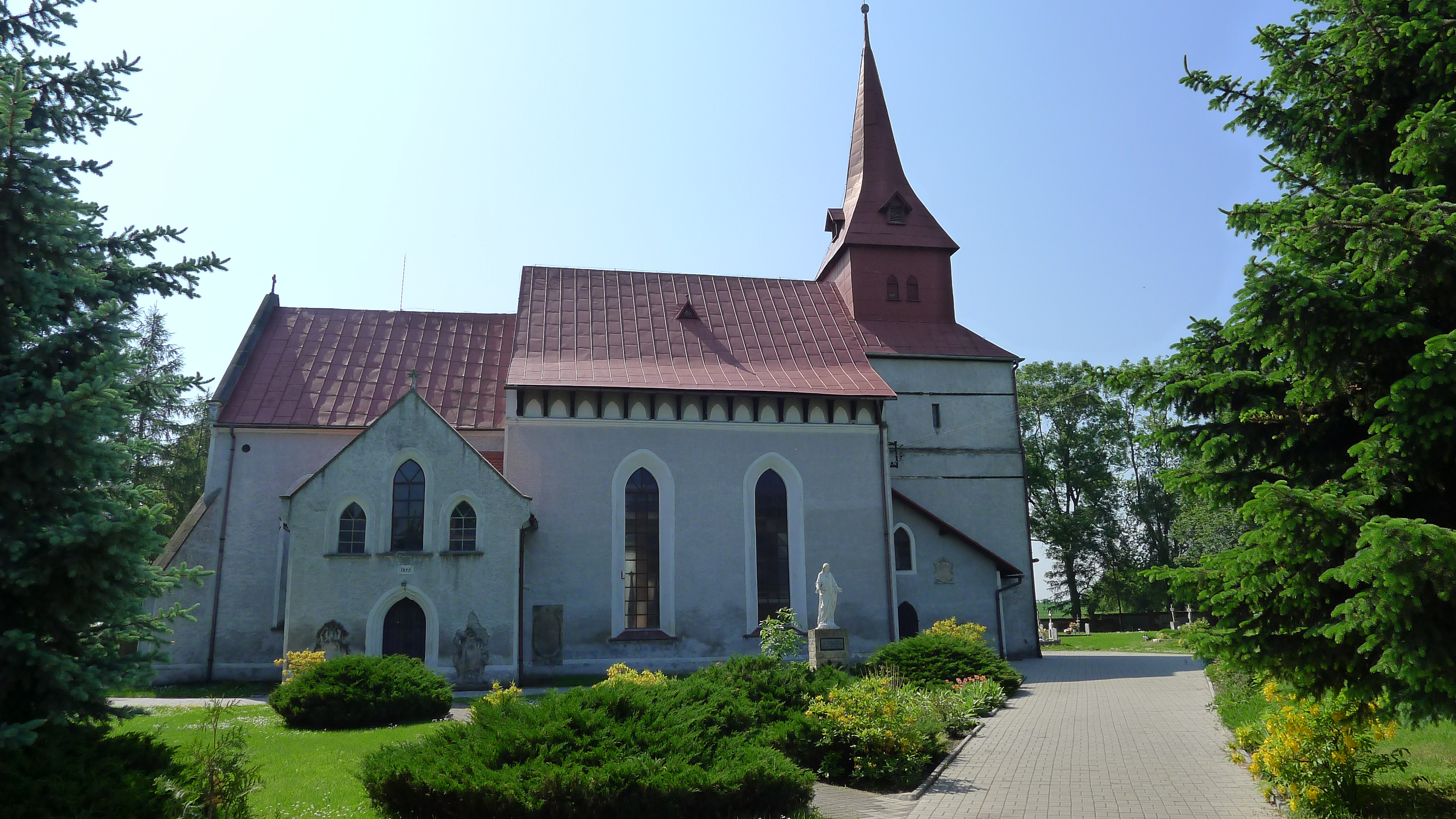
- Church of the Sacred Heart

- Location within Poland
- Coordinates: 51°12′N 15°48′E
- Country: Poland
- Voivodeship: Lower Silesian
- County: Złotoryja
- Gmina: Zagrodno

Population
  - Total: 1,100

Olszanica [ɔlʂaˈɲit͡sa] is a village in the administrative district of Gmina Zagrodno, within Złotoryja County, Lower Silesian Voivodeship, in south-western Poland.
