= Podgórki =

Podgórki may refer to the following places in Poland:

- Podgórki, Lower Silesian Voivodeship (south-west Poland)
- Podgórki, Masovian Voivodeship (east-central Poland)
- Podgórki, West Pomeranian Voivodeship (north-west Poland)
