= Sędziszowa, Lower Silesian Voivodeship =

Sędziszowa
- Village
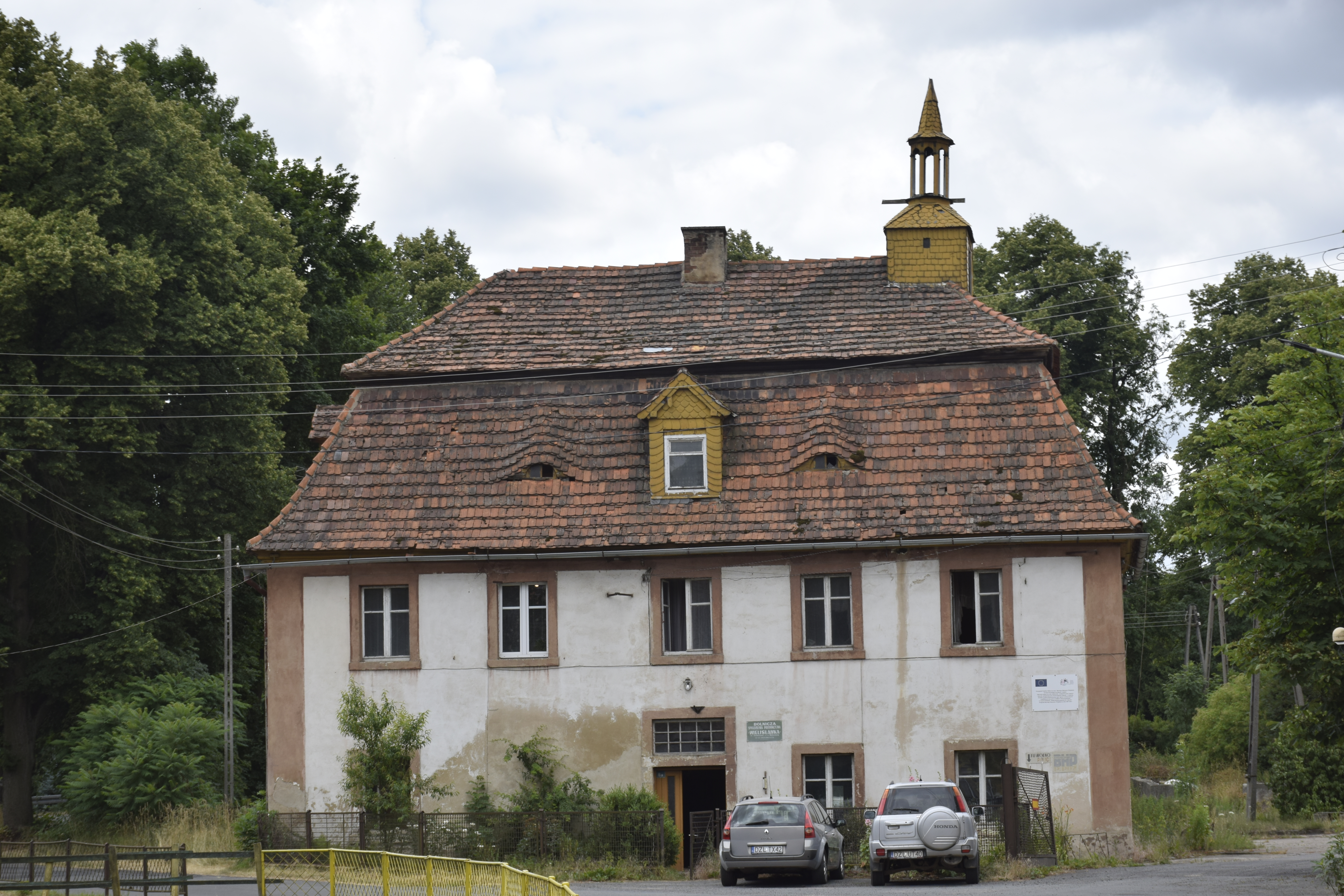
- House

- Location within Poland
- Coordinates: 51°01′34″N 15°52′16″E
- Country: Poland
- Voivodeship: Lower Silesian
- County: Złotoryja
- Gmina: Świerzawa

Sędziszowa ([sɛnd͡ʑiˈʂɔva]) (German: Röversdorf) is a village in the administrative district of Gmina Świerzawa, within Złotoryja County, Lower Silesian Voivodeship, in south-western Poland.

== Gallery ==
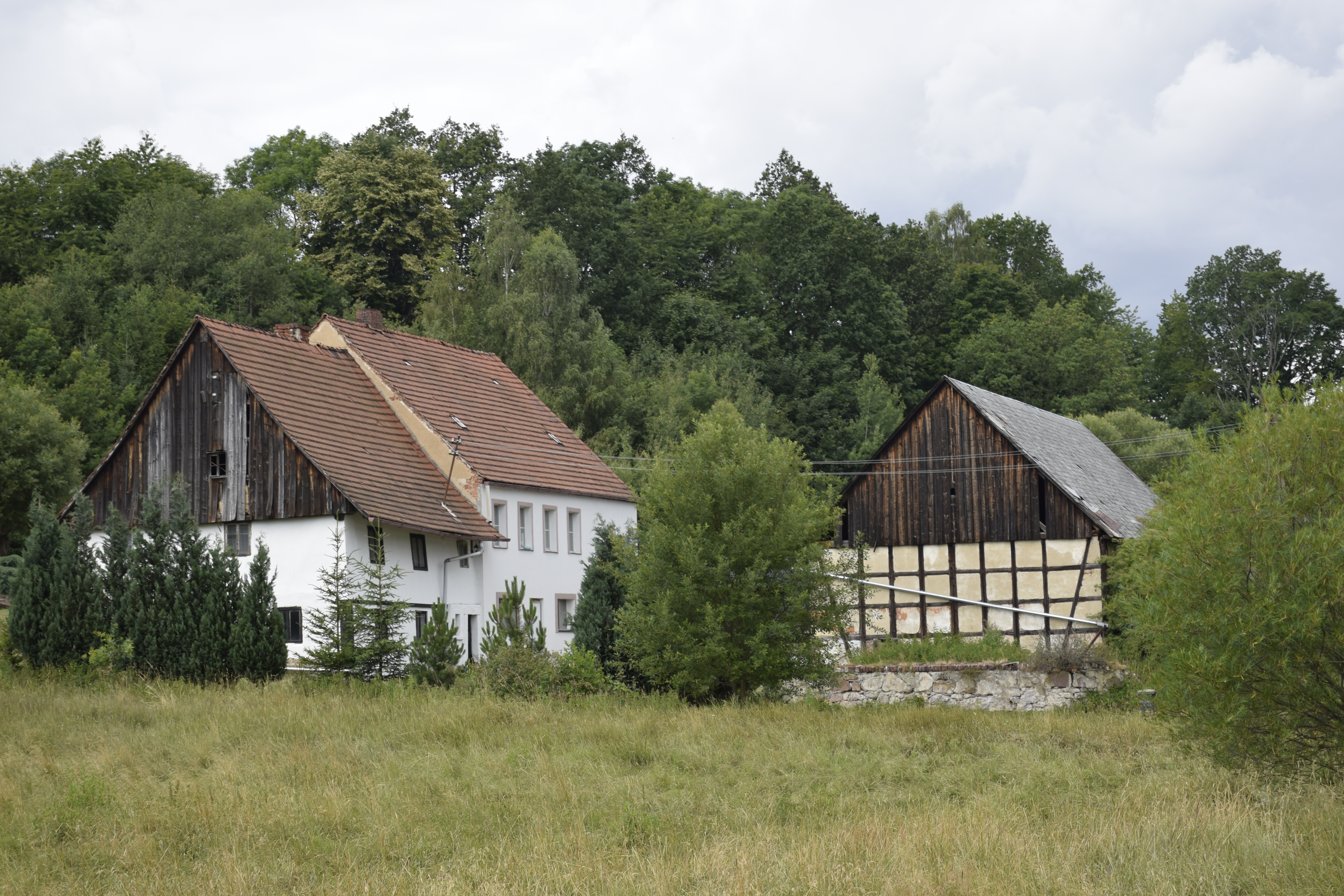
Farm

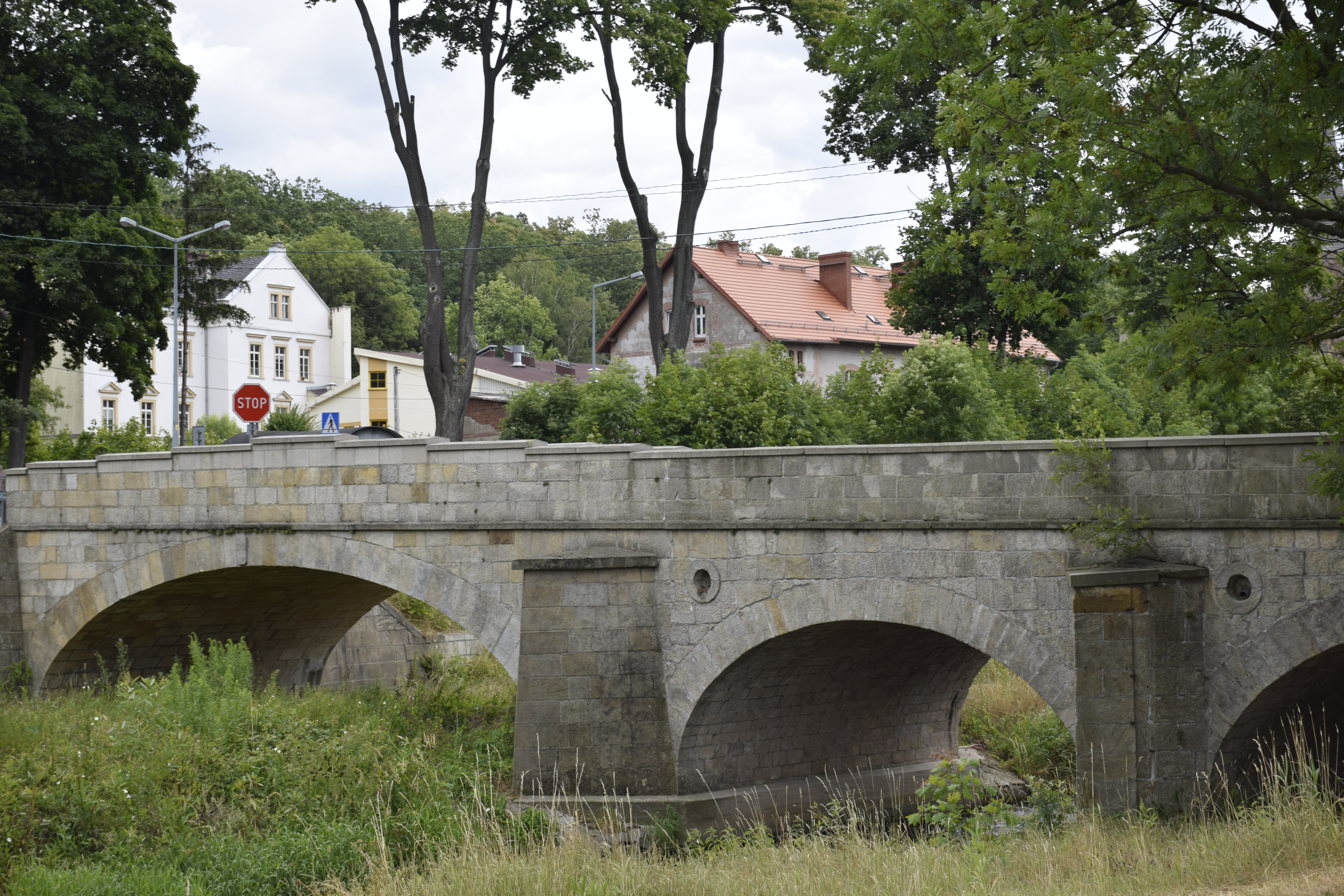
Stone bridge

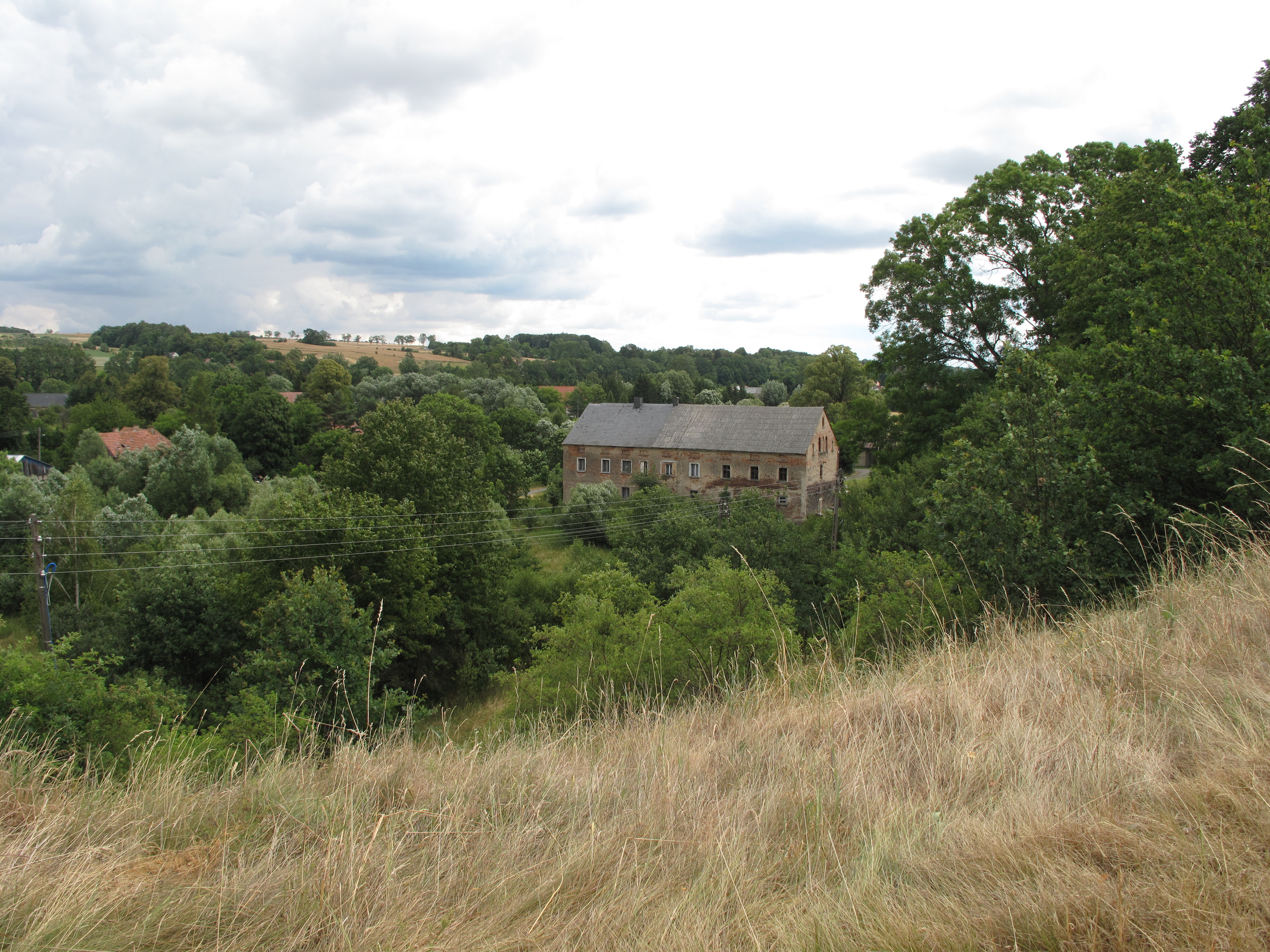
View from the hill

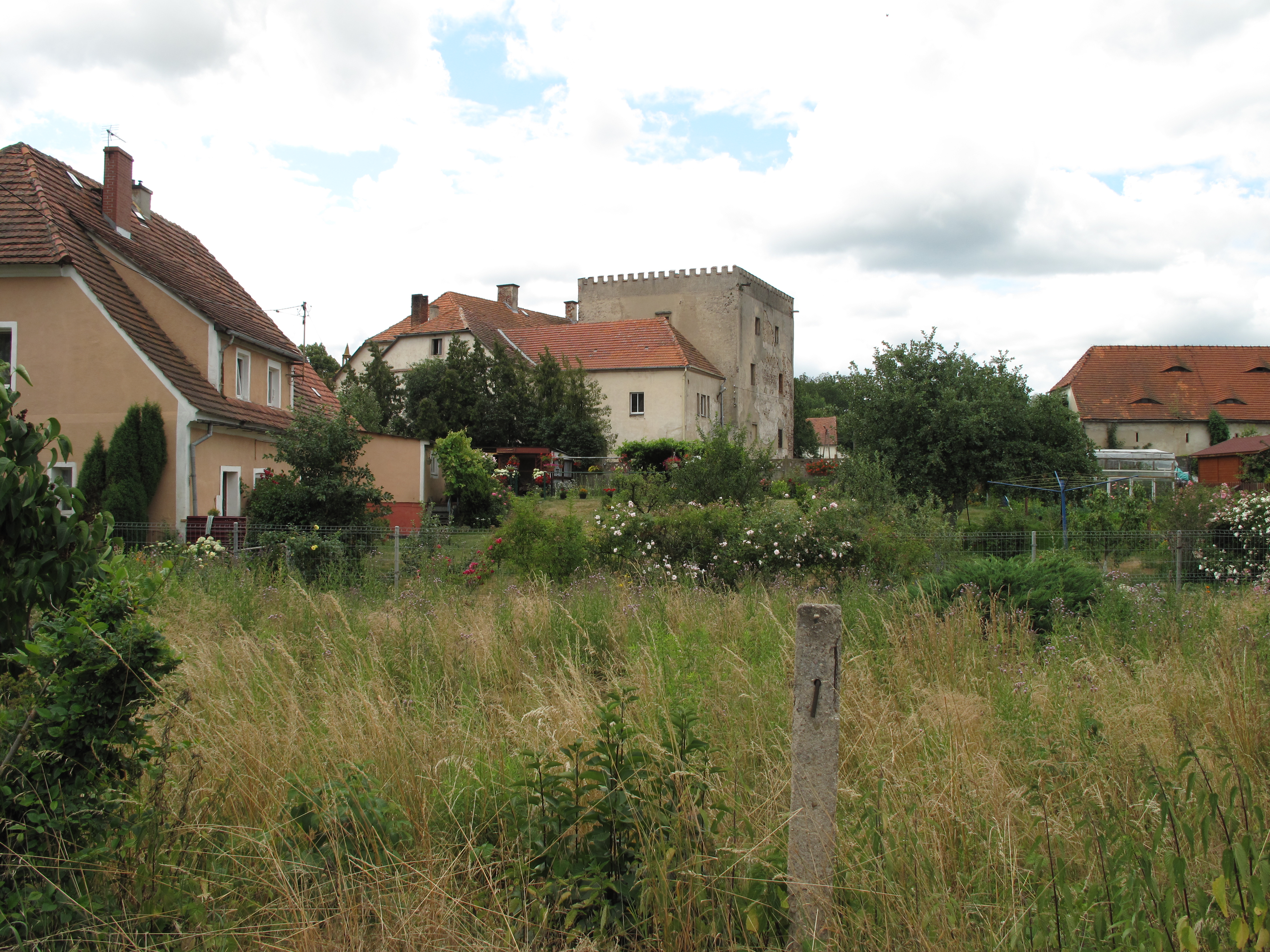
Manor
