= Posępsko =

- Village
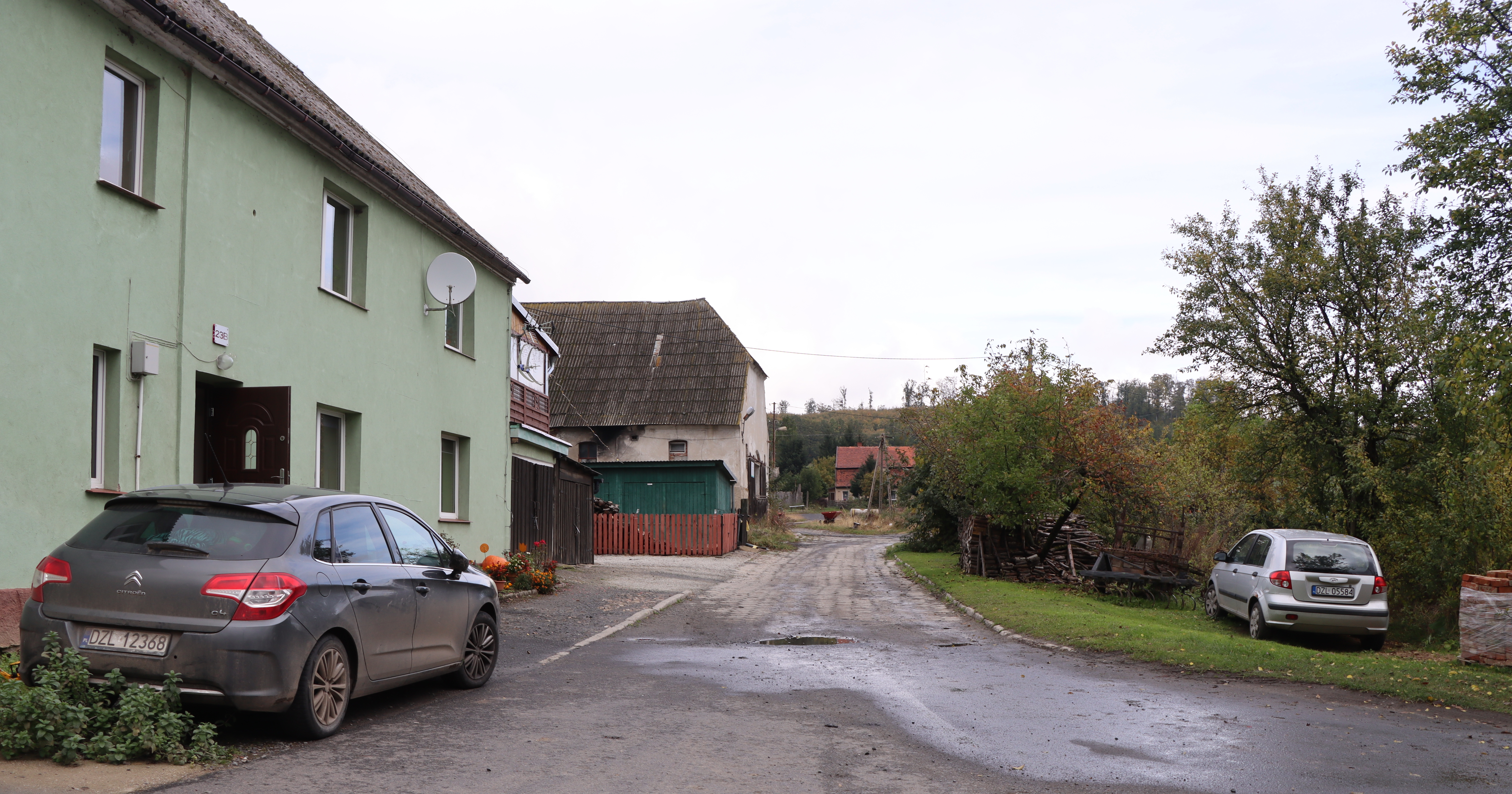
- Road in the settlement

- Location within Poland
- Coordinates: 51°01′08″N 15°45′19″E
- Country: Poland
- Voivodeship: Lower Silesian
- County: Złotoryja
- Gmina: Świerzawa

Posępsko [pɔˈsɛmpskɔ] is a village in the administrative district of Gmina Świerzawa, within Złotoryja County, Lower Silesian Voivodeship, in south-western Poland.

== Gallery ==
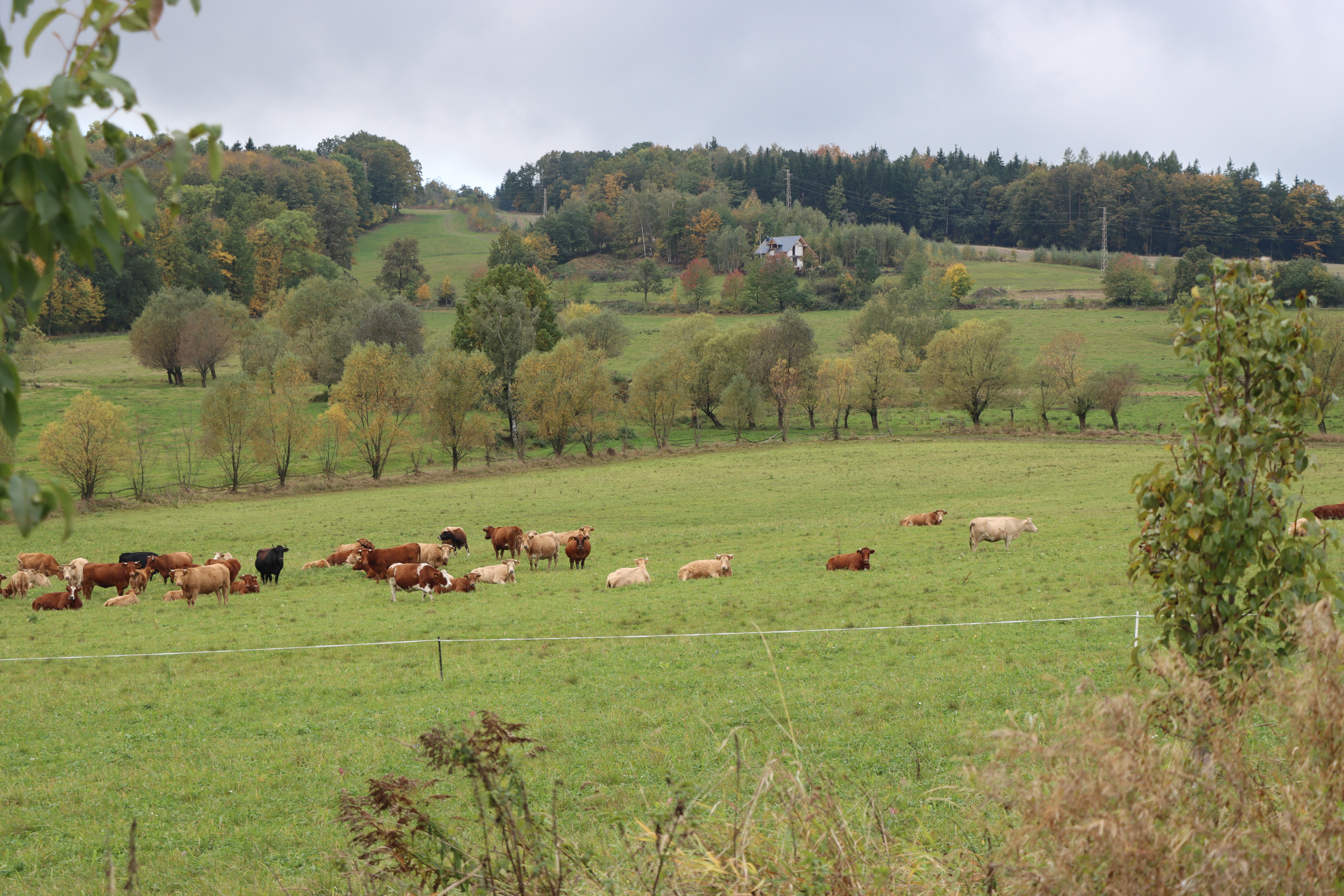
Surrounding countryside

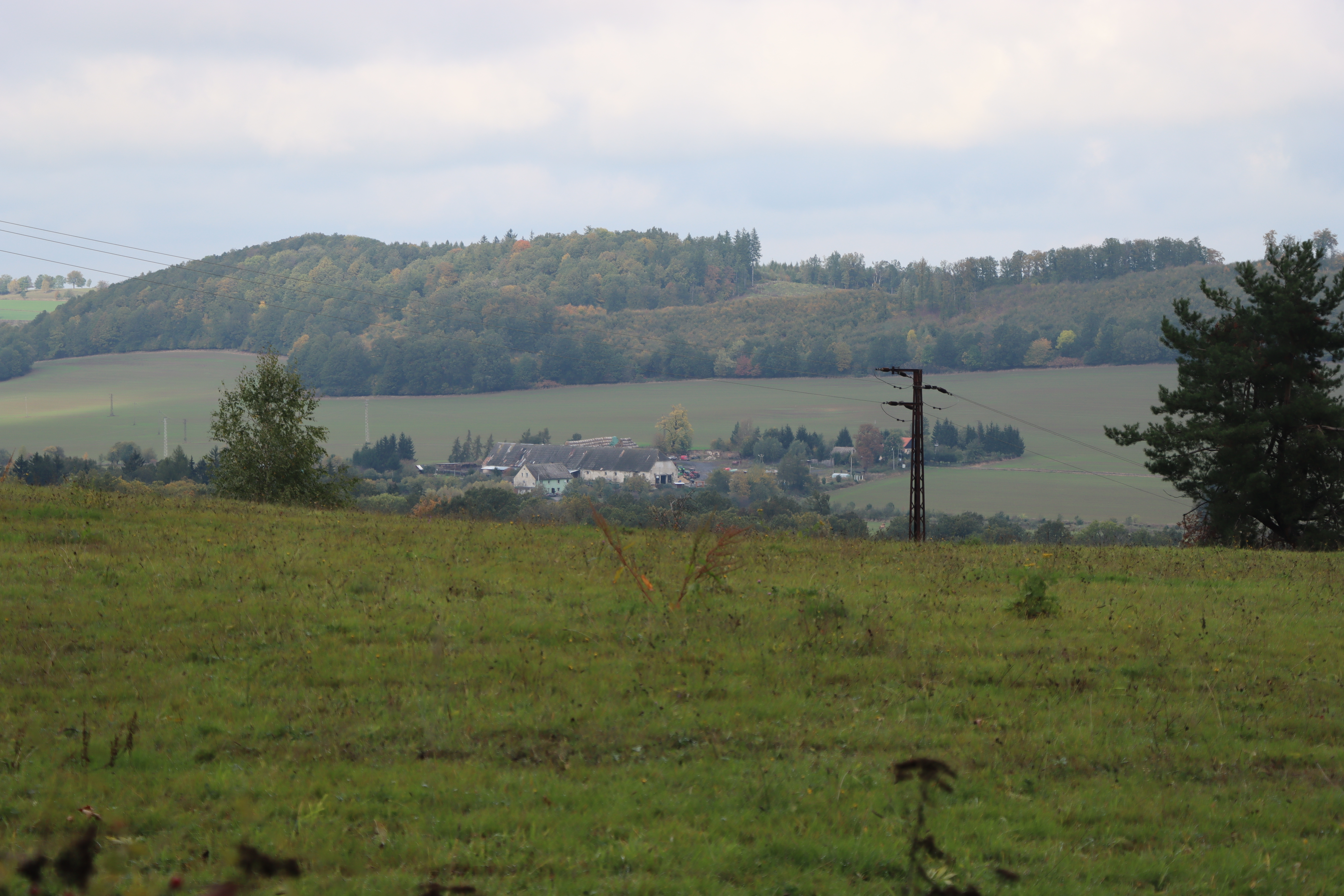
Posępsko from the distance
