= Gmina Świerzawa =

Gmina Świerzawa Świerzawa Commune
- Gmina
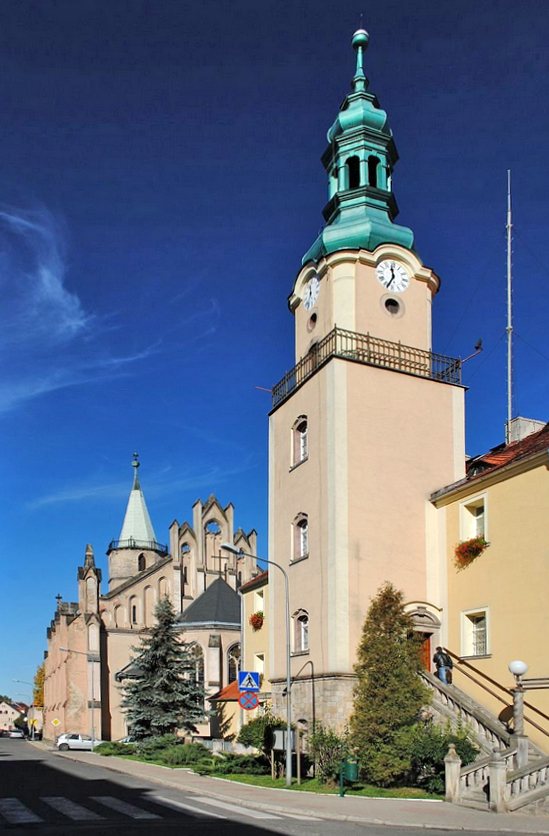
- Town Hall in Świerzawa, seat of the gmina office

- Flag Coat of arms
- Interactive map of Gmina Świerzawa
- Coordinates (Świerzawa): 51°01′N 15°54′E
- Country: Poland
- Voivodeship: Lower Silesian
- County: Złotoryja
- Seat: Świerzawa
- Sołectwos: Biegoszów, Dobków, Gozdno, Lubiechowa, Nowy Kościół, Podgórki, Rząśnik, Rzeszówek, Sędziszowa, Sokołowiec, Stara Kraśnica

Area
  - Total: 157.72 km^{2} (60.90 sq mi)

Population (2019-06-30)
  - Total: 7,552
  - Density: 47.88/km^{2} (124.0/sq mi)
  - Urban: 2,286
  - Rural: 5,266
- Time zone: UTC+1 (CET)
  - Summer (DST): UTC+2 (CEST)
- Vehicle registration: DZL
- Website: http://www.swierzawa.pl

Gmina Świerzawa is an urban-rural gmina (administrative district) in Złotoryja County, Lower Silesian Voivodeship, in south-western Poland. Its seat is the town of Świerzawa, which lies approximately 13 kilometres (8 mi) south of Złotoryja, and 81 kilometres (50 mi) west of the regional capital Wrocław.

The gmina covers an area of 157.72 square kilometres (60.9 sq mi), and as of 2019 its total population is 7,552.

== Neighbouring gminas ==
Gmina Świerzawa is bordered by the gminas of Bolków, Janowice Wielkie, Jeżów Sudecki, Męcinka, Pielgrzymka, Wleń and Złotoryja.

== Villages ==
Apart from the town of Świerzawa, the gmina contains the villages of Biegoszów, Dobków, Gozdno, Janochów, Lubiechowa, Nowy Kościół, Podgórki, Posępsko, Rząśnik, Rzeszówek, Sędziszowa, Sokołowiec and Stara Kraśnica.

== Twin towns – sister cities ==
Gmina Świerzawa is twinned with:

- Chocz, Poland
- Kottmar, Germany
- Malá Skála, Czech Republic
