= Stara Kraśnica =

- Village
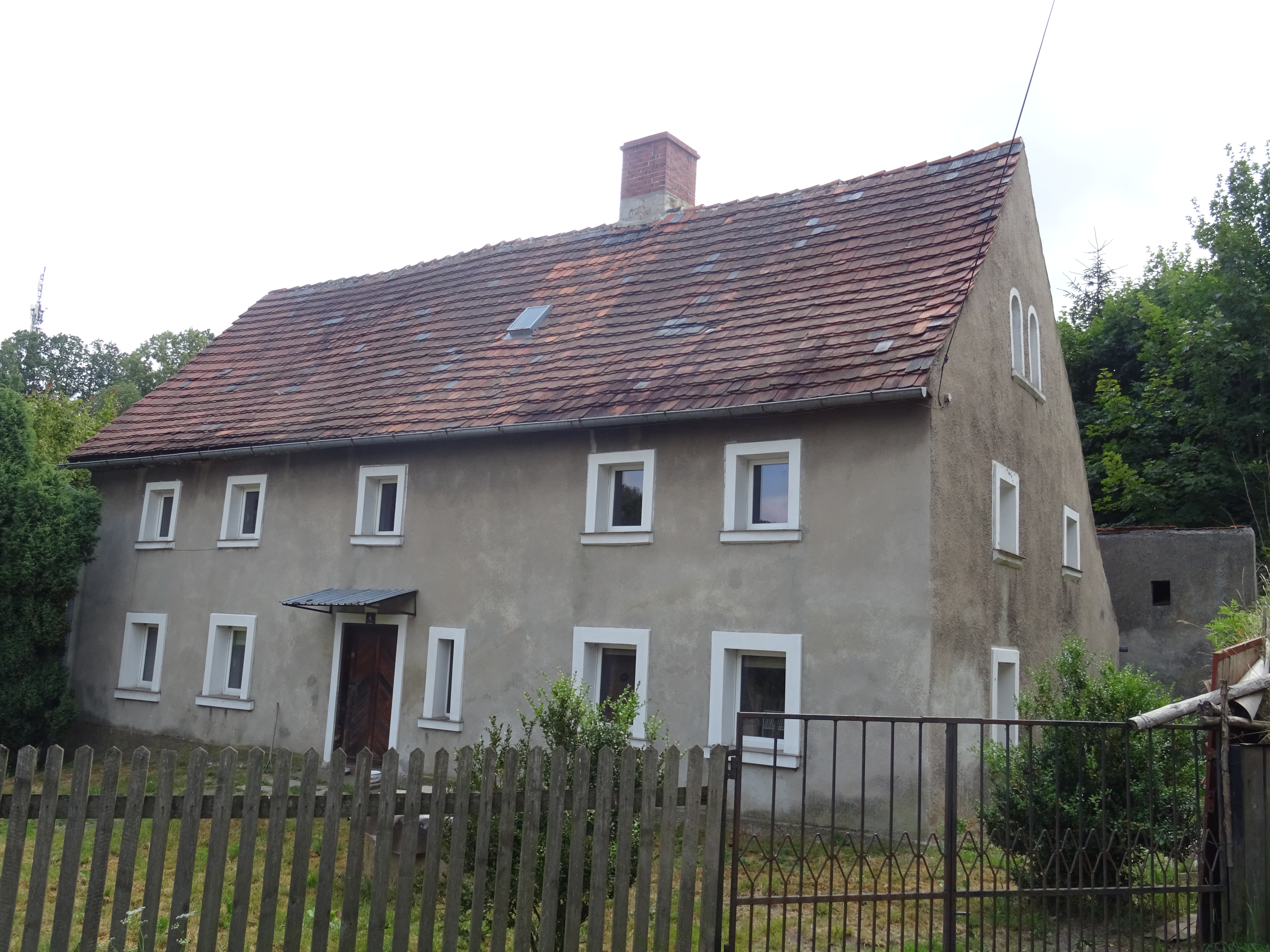
- A house

- Location within Poland
- Coordinates: 51°0′N 15°55′E
- Country: Poland
- Voivodeship: Lower Silesian
- County: Złotoryja
- Gmina: Świerzawa

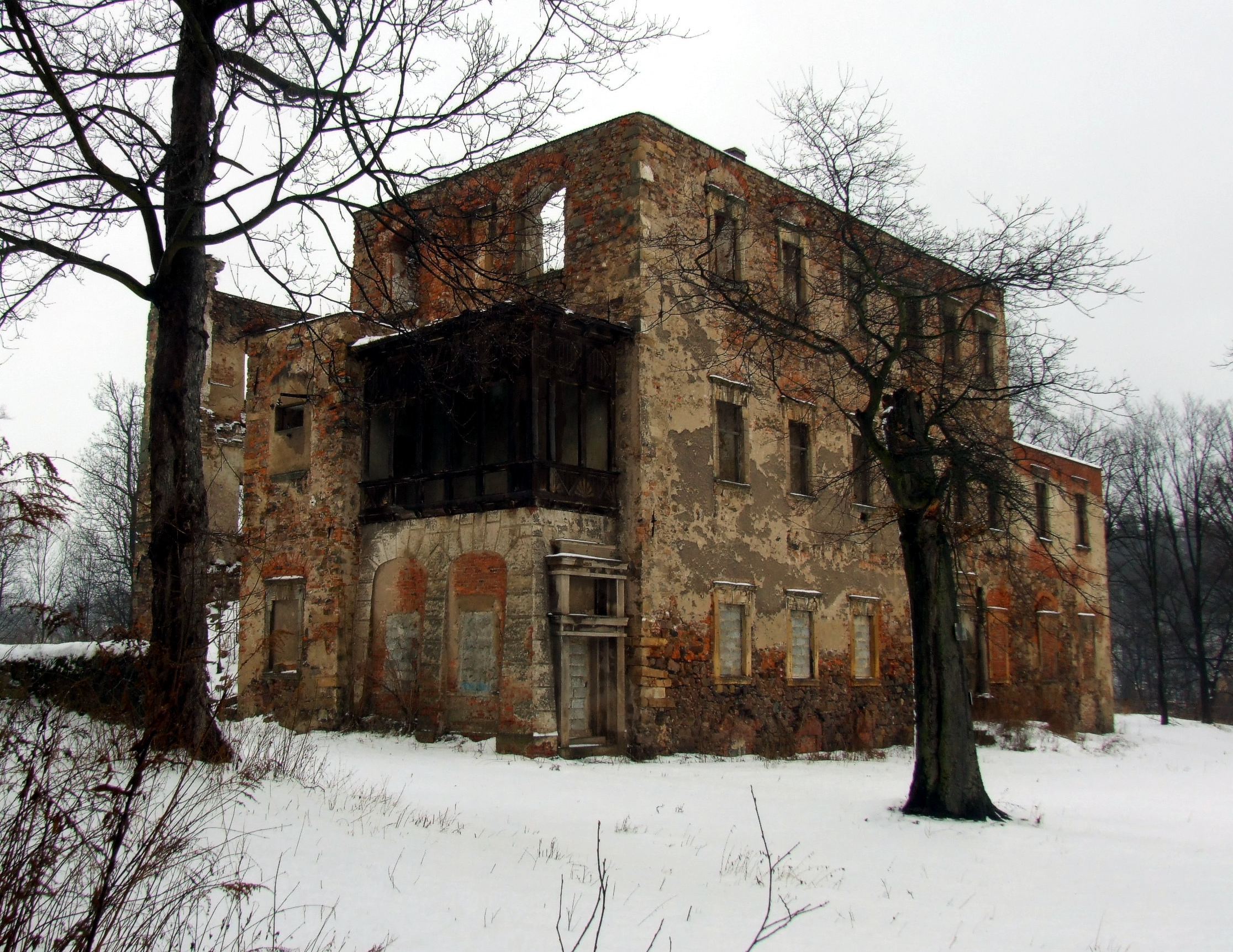
Ruins of castle in Stara Kraśnica

Stara Kraśnica ([ˈstara kraɕˈnit͡sa]) (German: Alt-Schönau an der Katzbach) is a village in the administrative district of Gmina Świerzawa, within Złotoryja County, Lower Silesian Voivodeship, in south-western Poland.

== Gallery ==
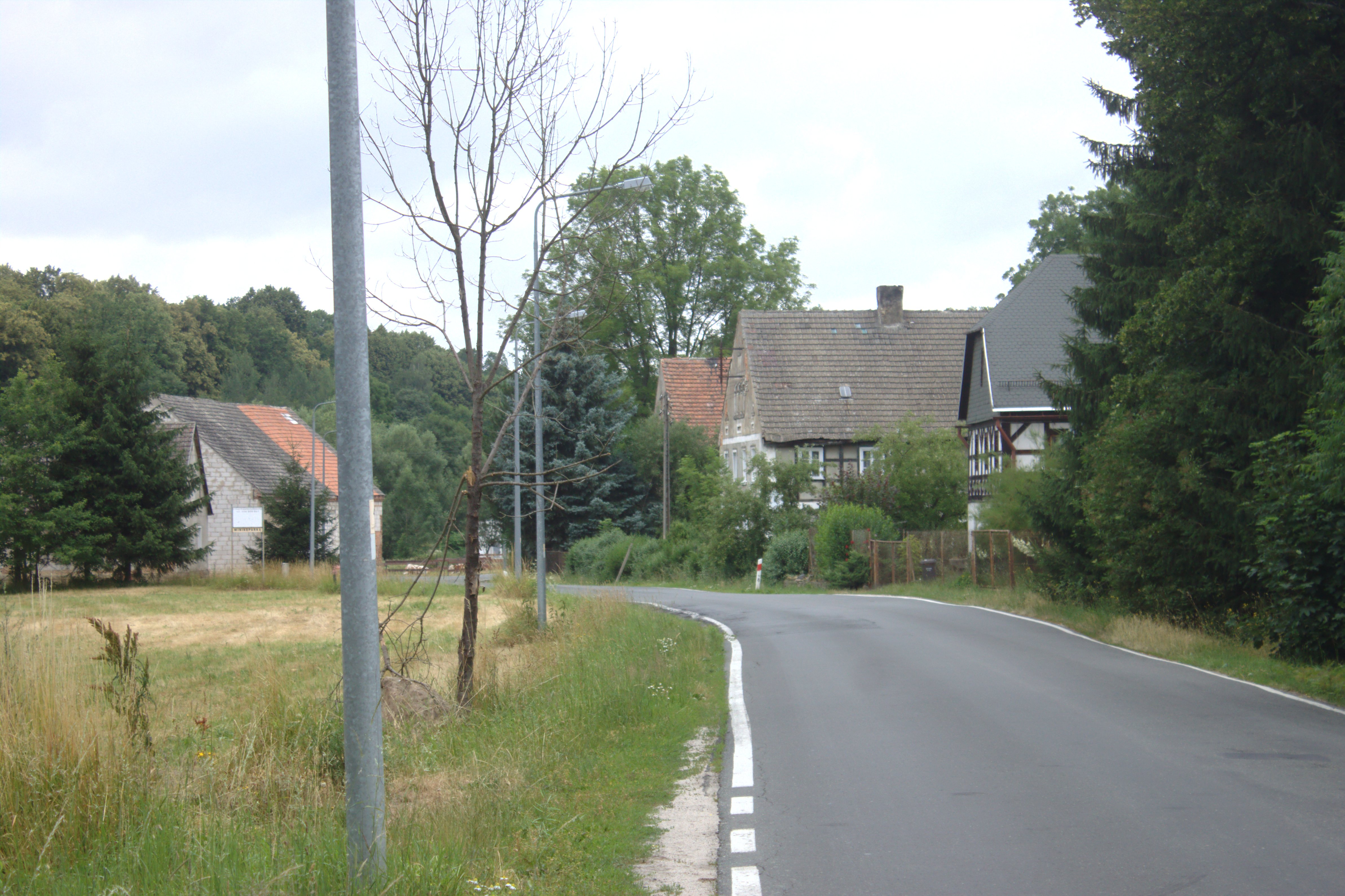
Road with houses

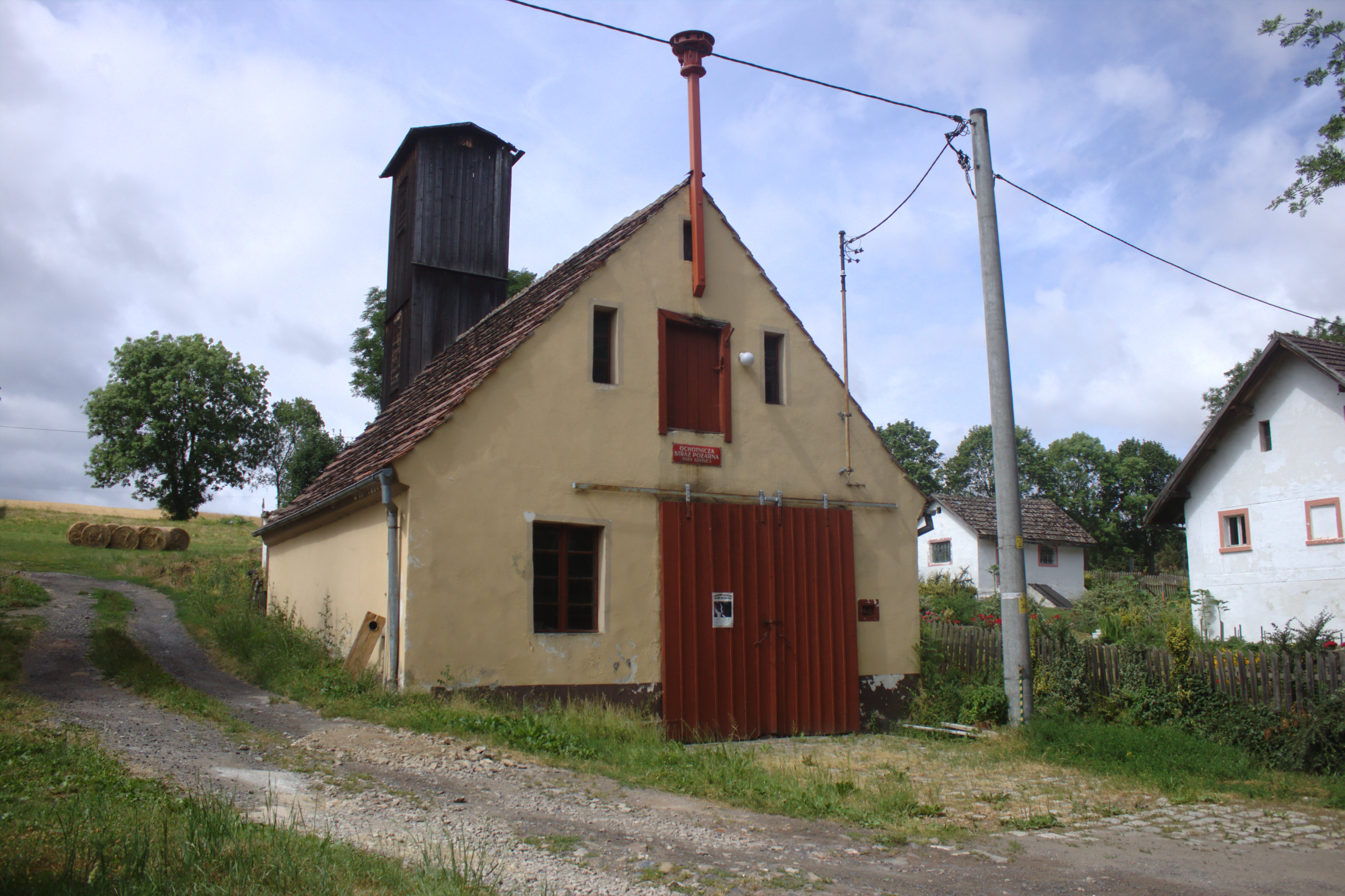
Old fire station

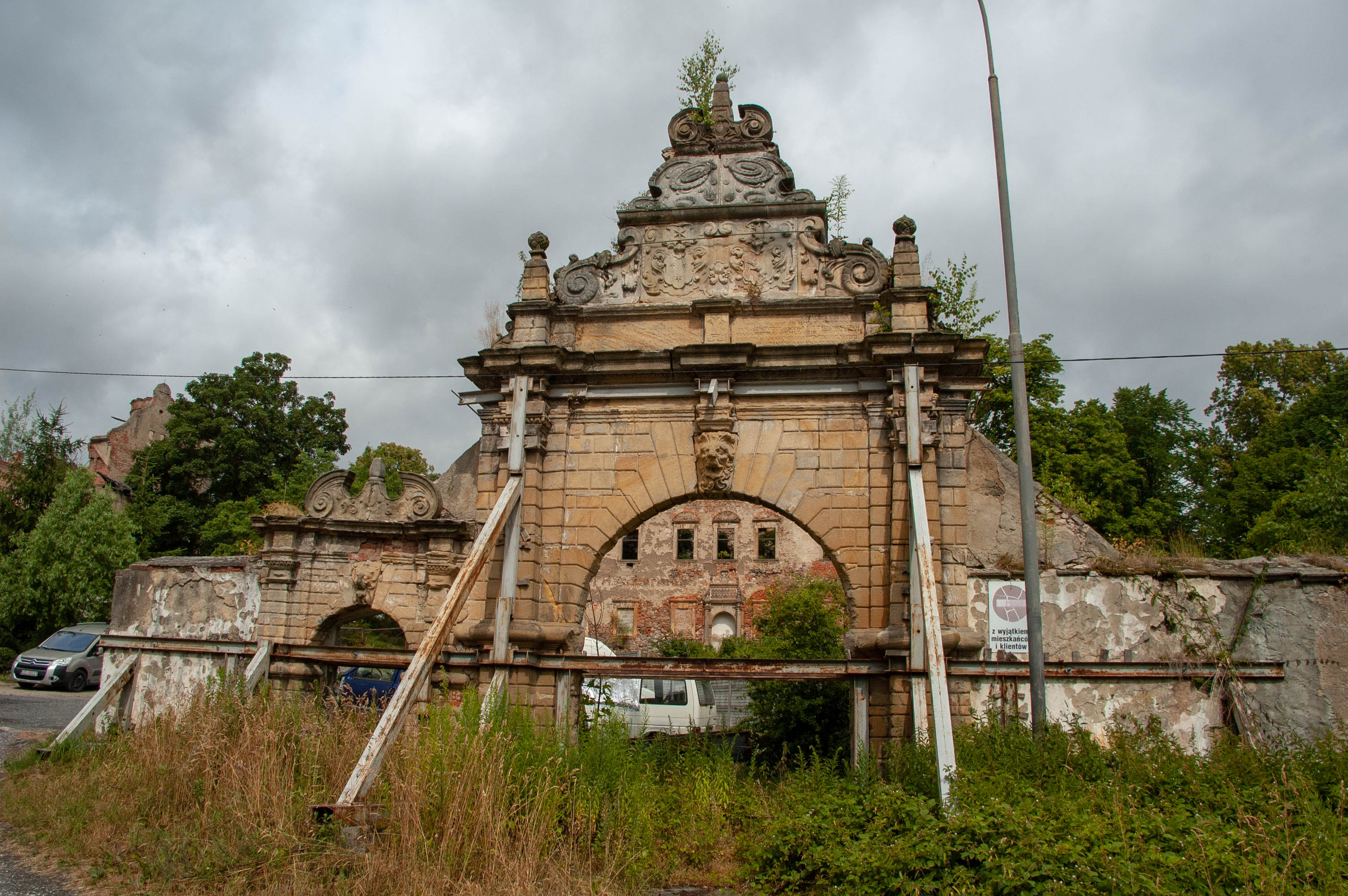
Gate of a manor (2019)
