= Rząśnik, Lower Silesian Voivodeship =

Rząśnik
- Village
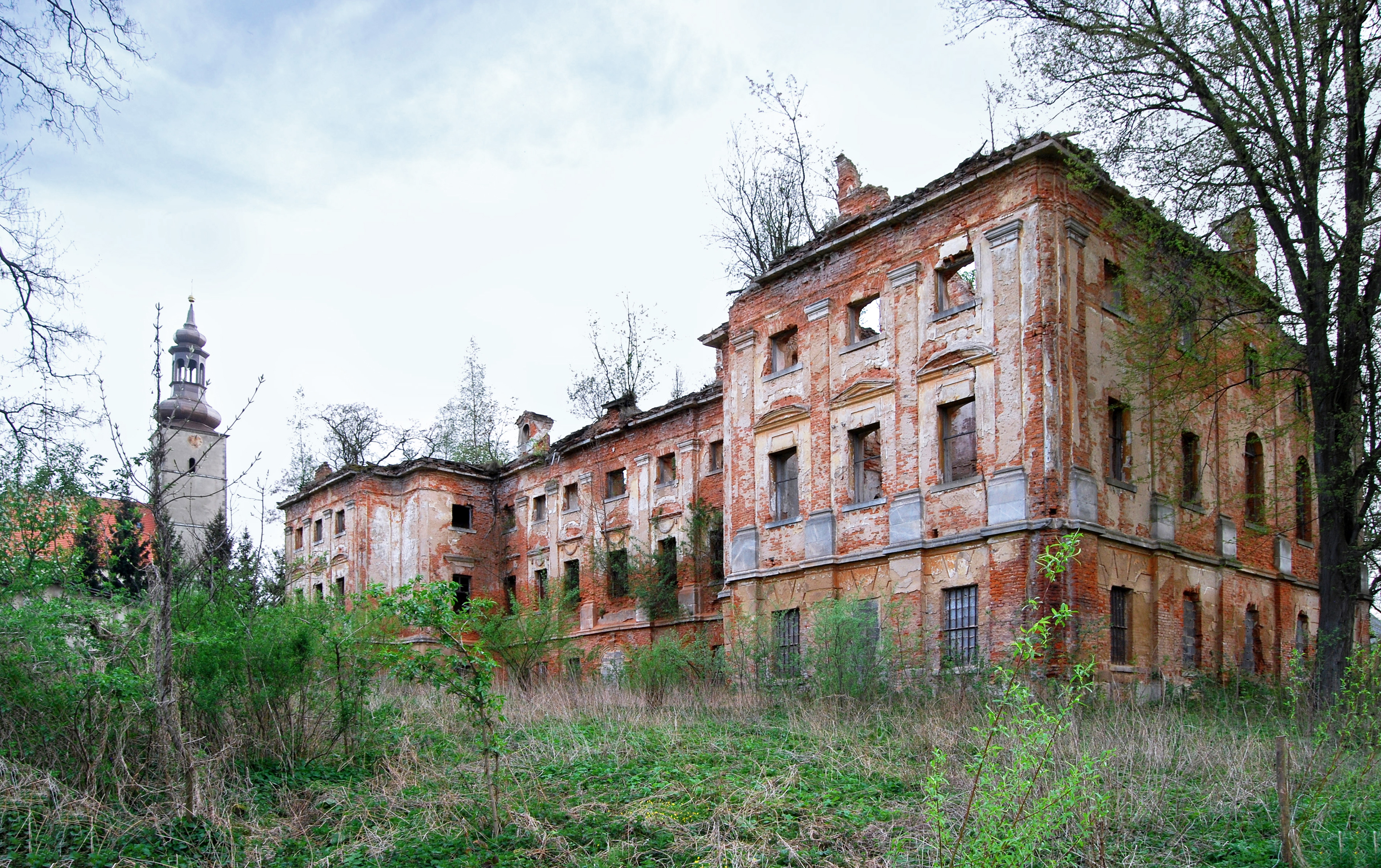
- Palace

- Location within Poland
- Coordinates: 51°1′N 15°47′E
- Country: Poland
- Voivodeship: Lower Silesian
- County: Złotoryja
- Gmina: Świerzawa
- Time zone: UTC+1 (CET)
  - Summer (DST): UTC+2 (CEST)
- Vehicle registration: DZL

Rząśnik (Polish pronunciation: [ˈʐɔ̃ɕɲik]) (German: Schönwaldau) is a village in the administrative district of Gmina Świerzawa, within Złotoryja County, Lower Silesian Voivodeship, in south-western Poland.
