= Sokołowiec =

- Village
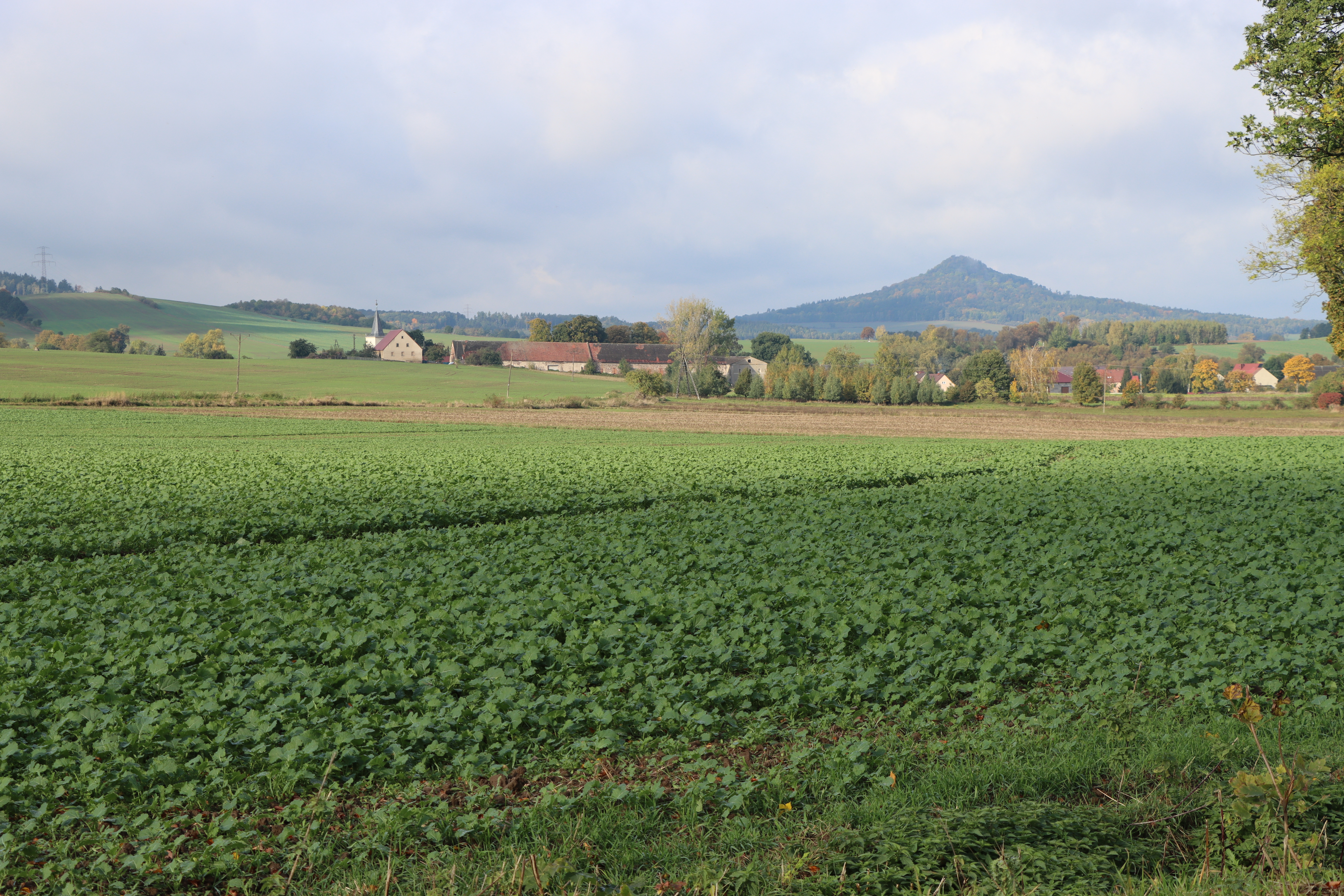
- Fields, part of a central Sokołowiec and Ostrzyca hill in the background

- Location within Poland
- Coordinates: 51°2′N 15°49′E
- Country: Poland
- Voivodeship: Lower Silesian
- County: Złotoryja
- Gmina: Świerzawa

Sokołowiec ([sɔkɔˈwɔvjɛt͡s]) (German: Falkenhain) is a village in the administrative district of Gmina Świerzawa, within Złotoryja County, Lower Silesian Voivodeship, in south-western Poland.

== Gallery ==
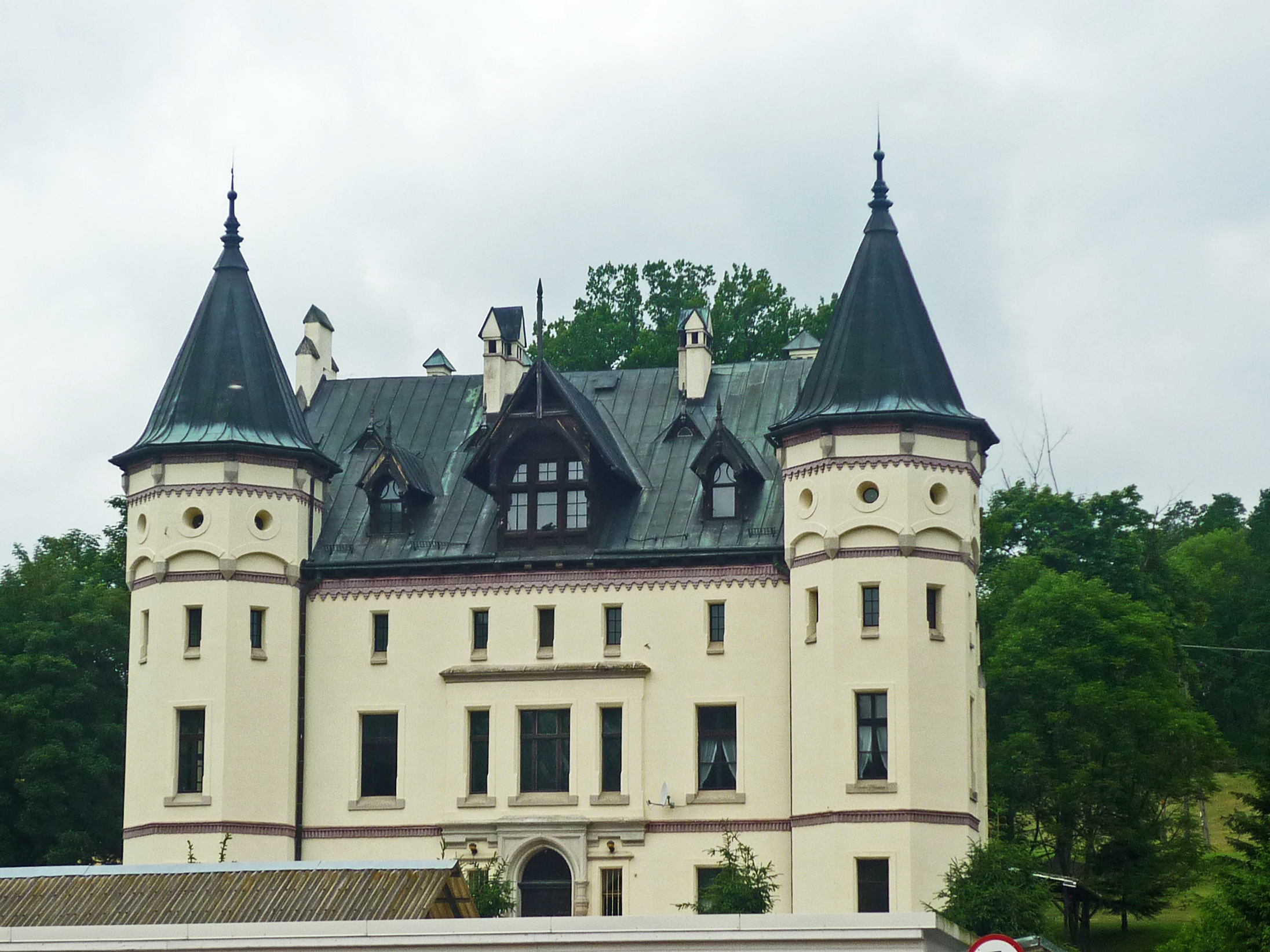
Palace in upper Sokołowiec

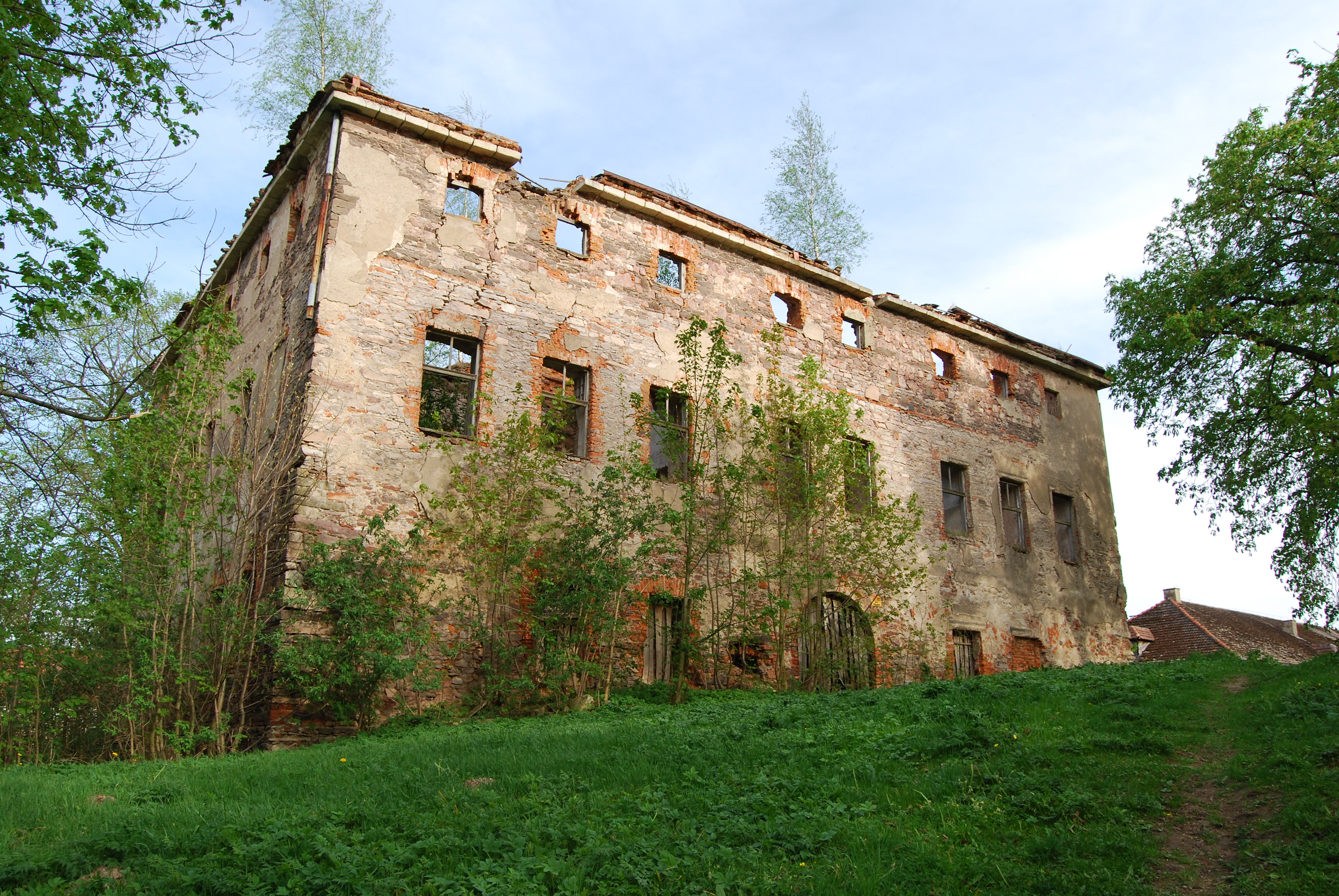
Ruin of a palace in central Sokołowiec

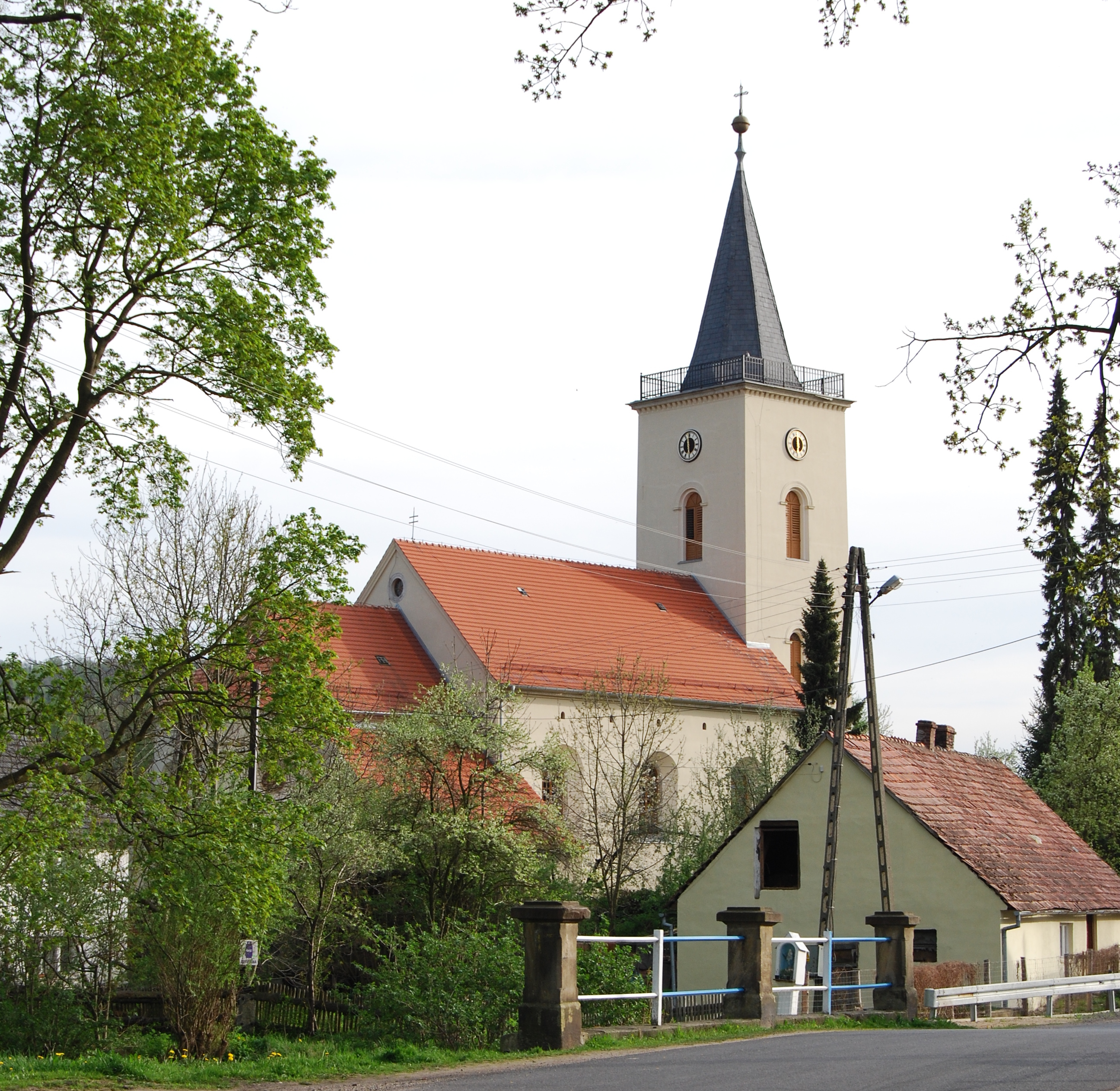
Saint Hedwig church

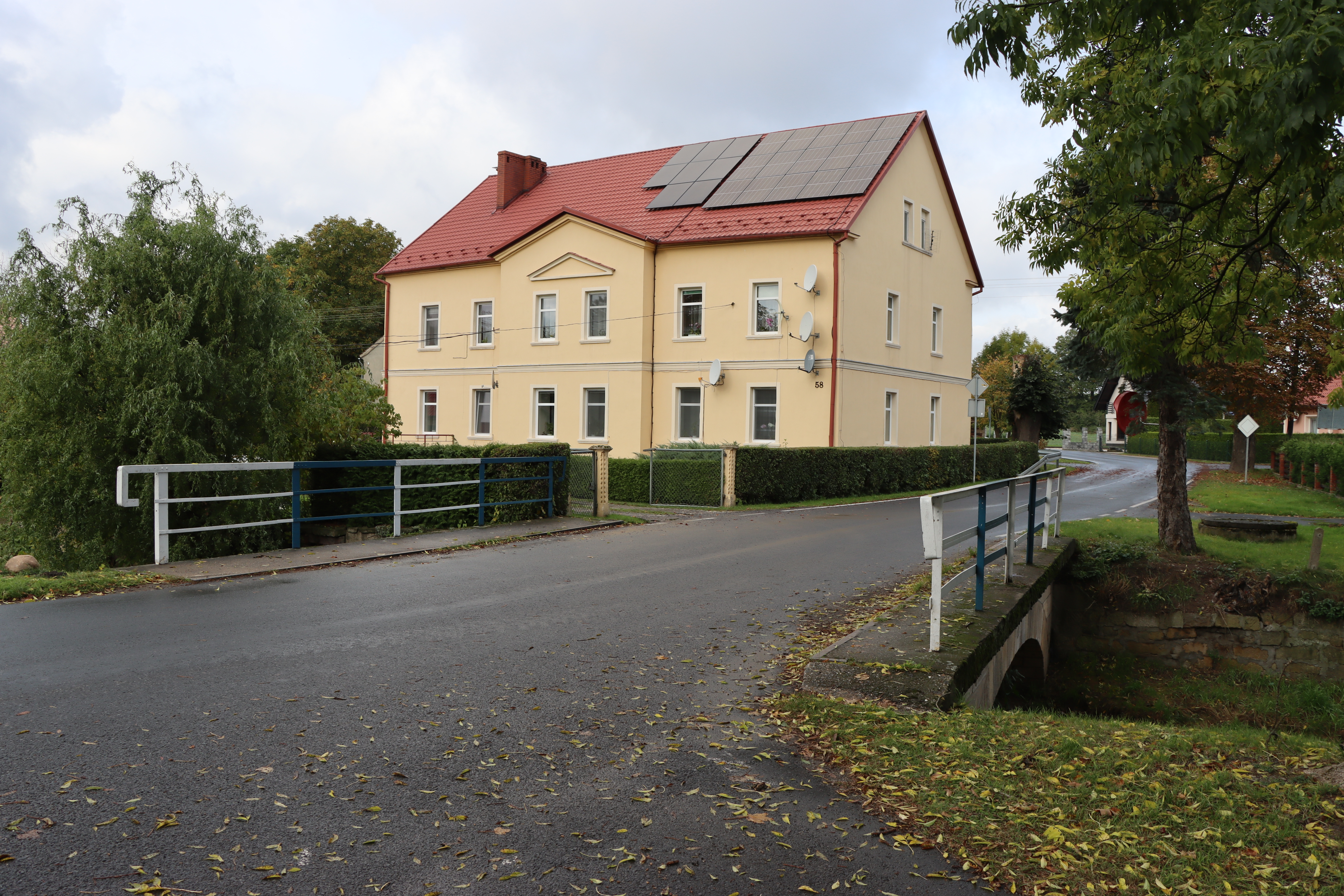
House by the road
