= Janochów =

- Village
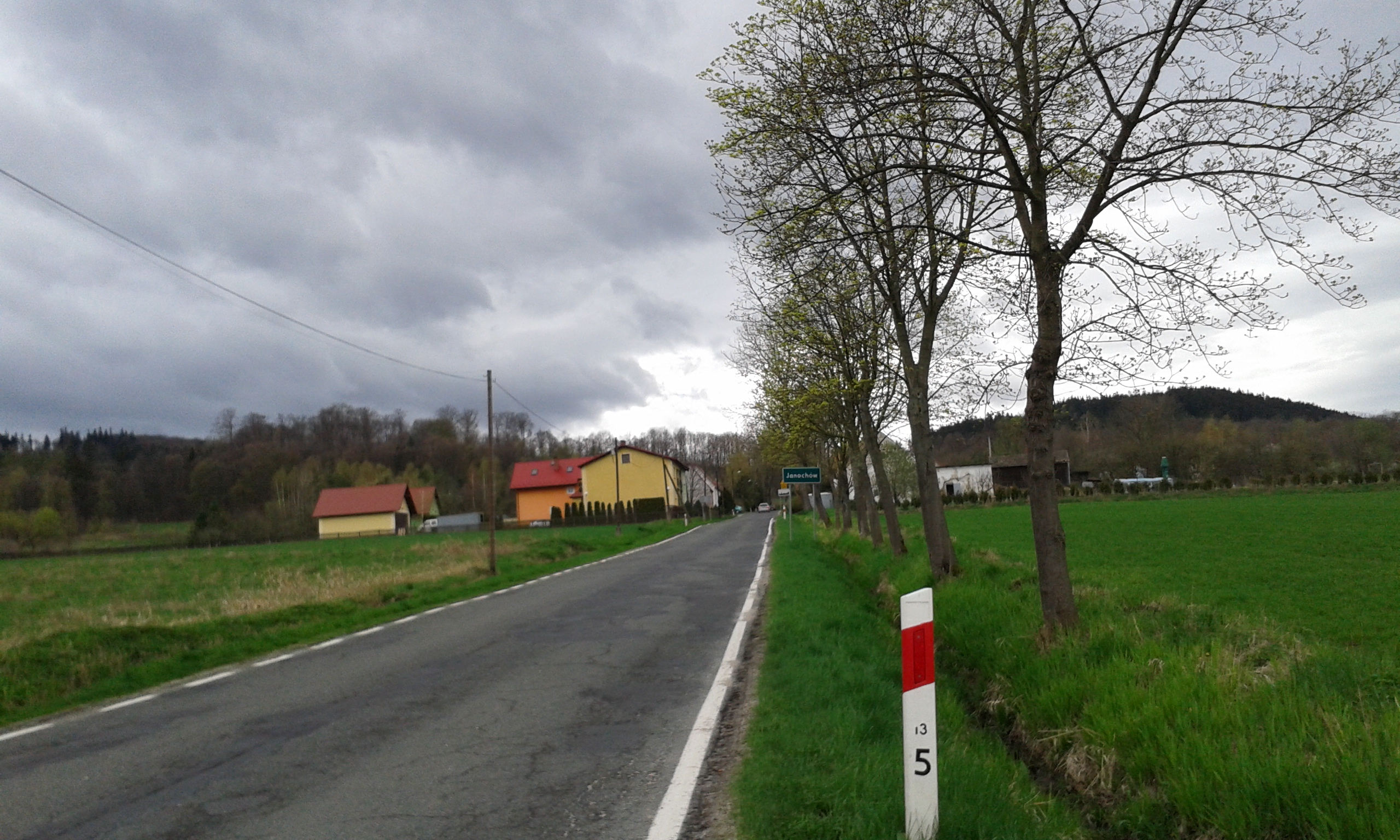

- Location within Poland
- Coordinates: 50°58′41″N 15°52′30″E
- Country: Poland
- Voivodeship: Lower Silesian
- County: Złotoryja
- Gmina: Świerzawa

Janochów [jaˈnɔxuf] is a village in the administrative district of Gmina Świerzawa, within Złotoryja County, Lower Silesian Voivodeship, in south-western Poland.
