= Lubiechowa =

- Village
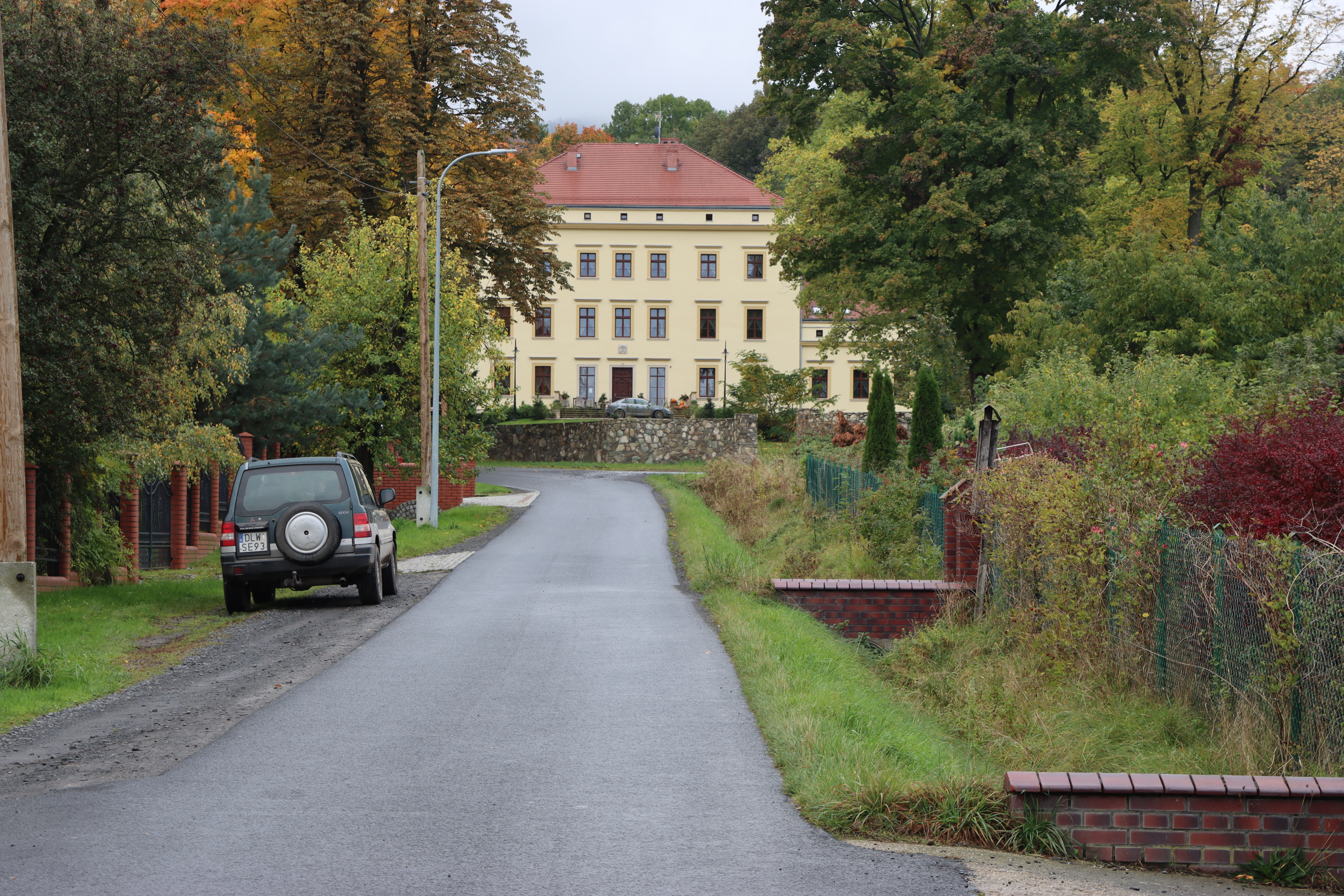
- A street towards a palace

- Location within Poland
- Coordinates: 51°0′N 15°51′E
- Country: Poland
- Voivodeship: Lower Silesian
- County: Złotoryja
- Gmina: Świerzawa
- Population: 640

Lubiechowa ([lubjɛˈxɔva]) (German: Liebental or Hohenliebenthal) is a village in the administrative district of Gmina Świerzawa, within Złotoryja County, Lower Silesian Voivodeship, in southwestern Poland.

== Gallery ==
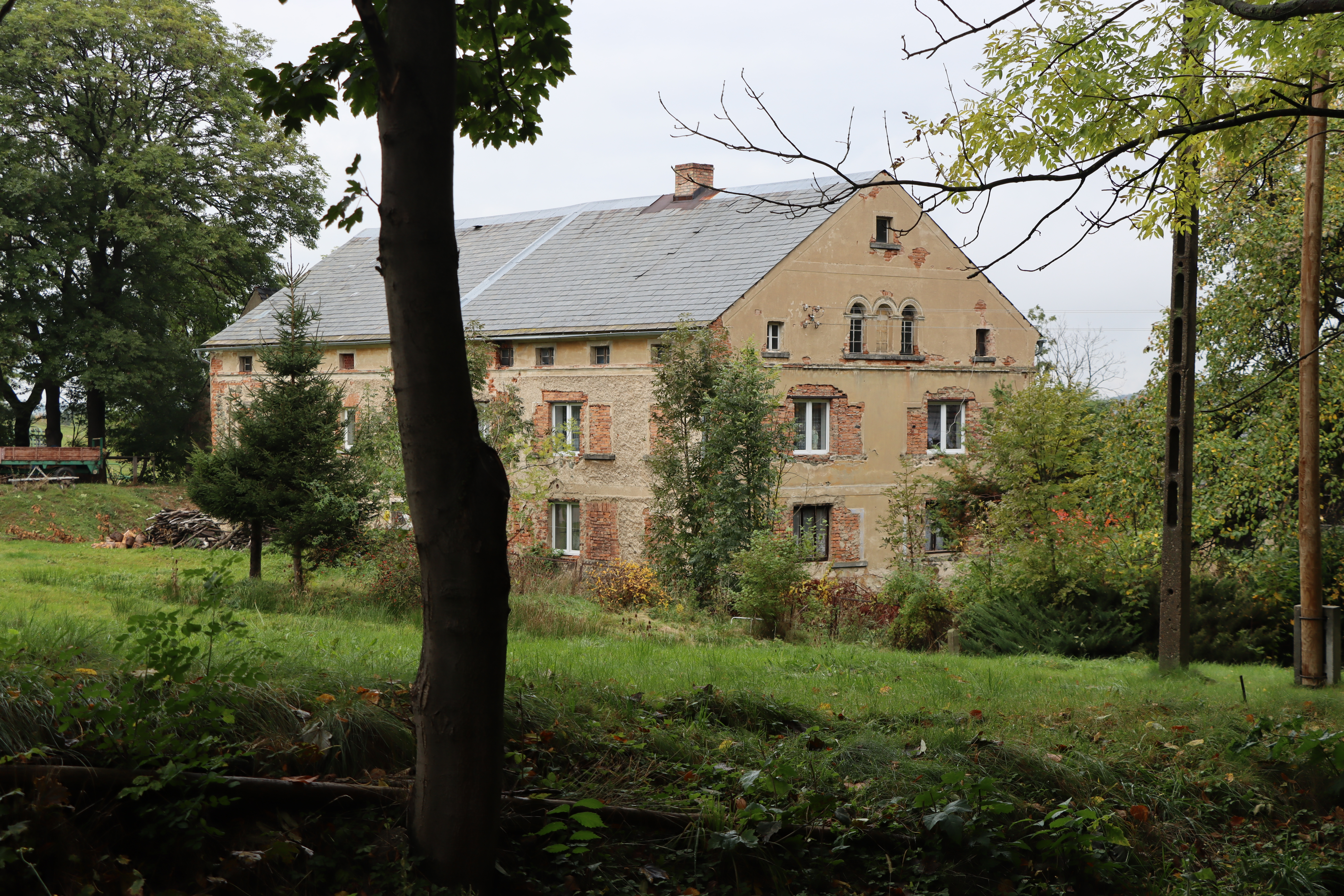
A house

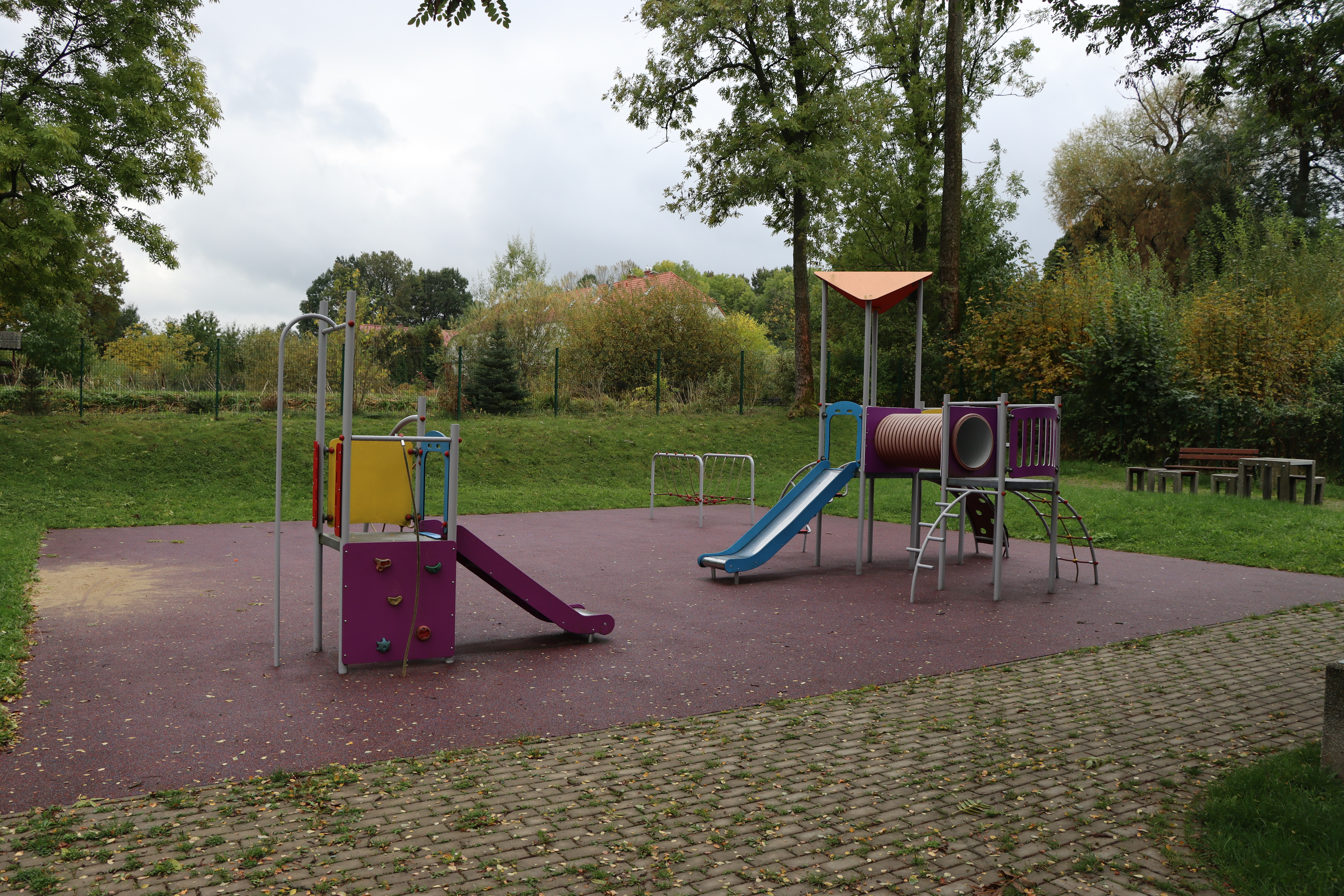
Children playground

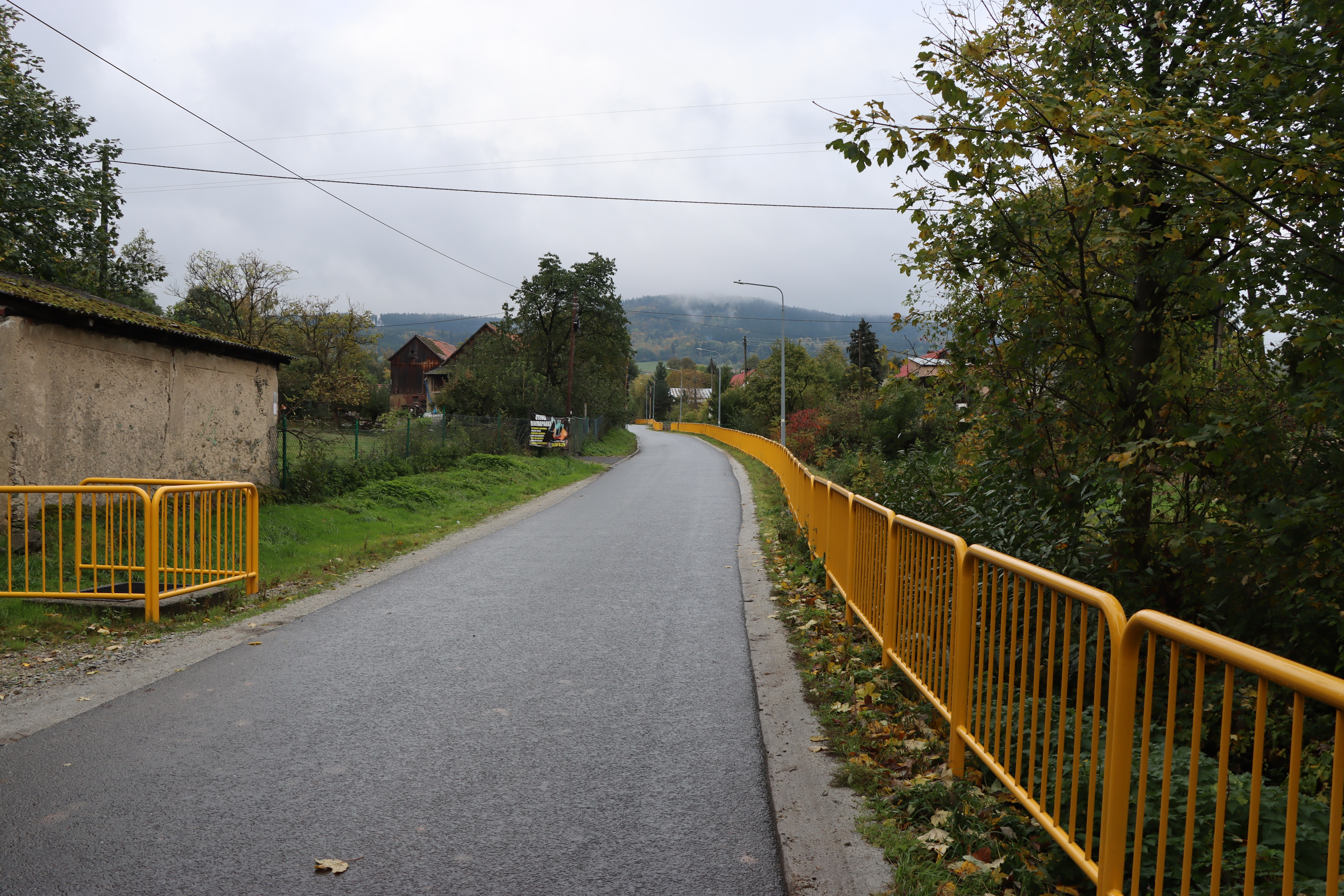
Main street with Okole mount in the vicinity

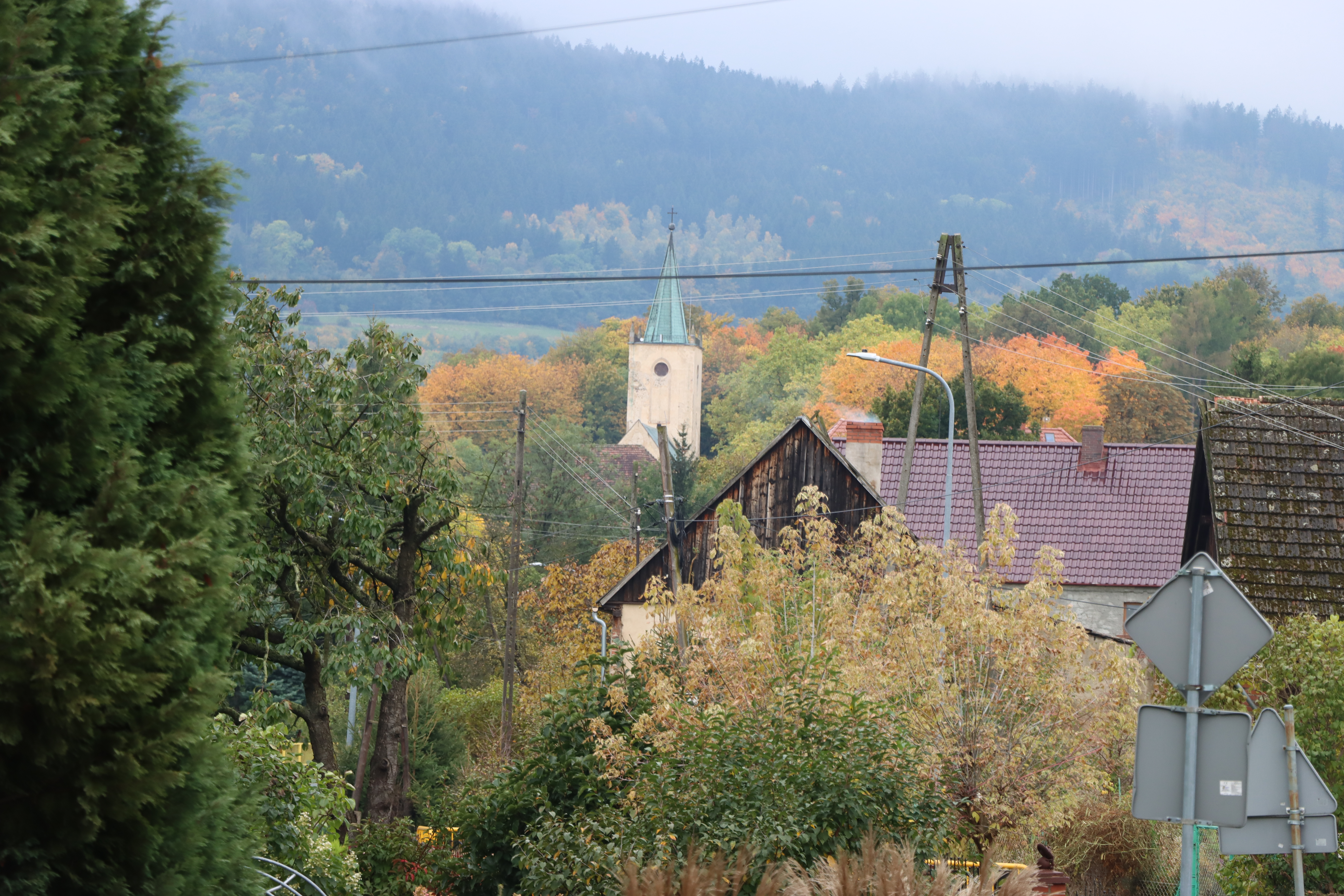
Autumn in Lubiechowa with a tower of a gothic church of Saint Peter and Paul

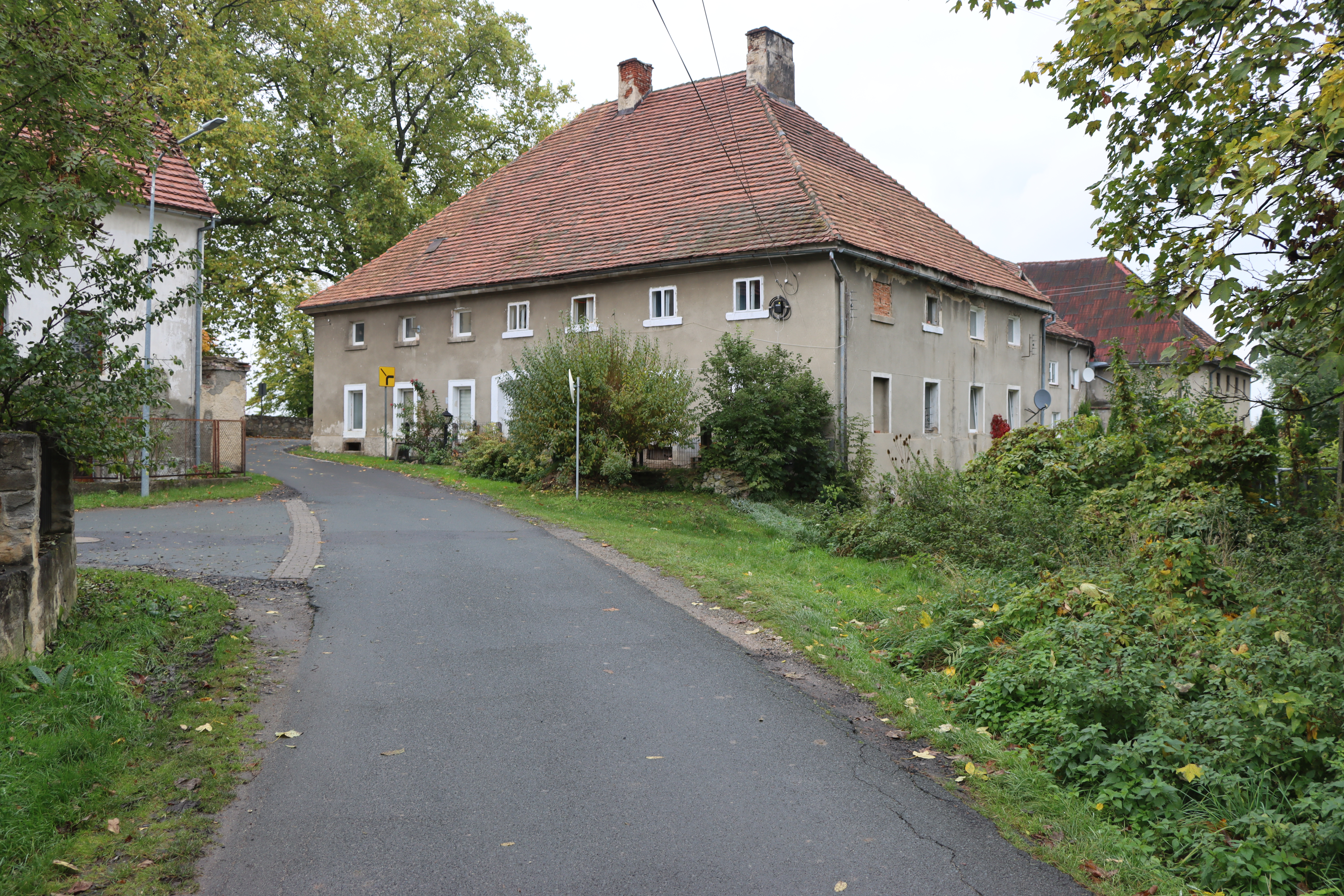
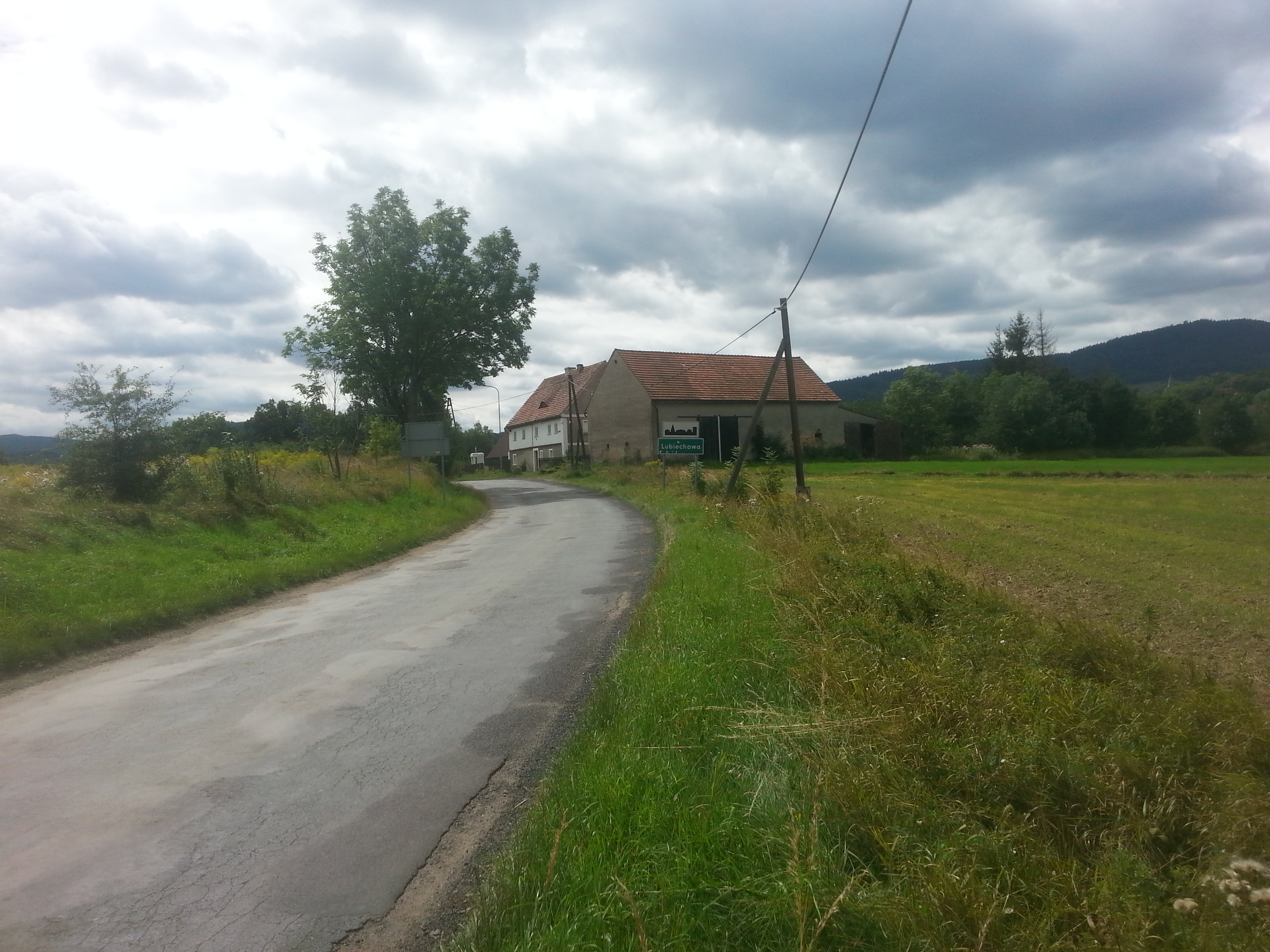
Lubiechowa
House near the castle
