= Biegoszów =

- Village
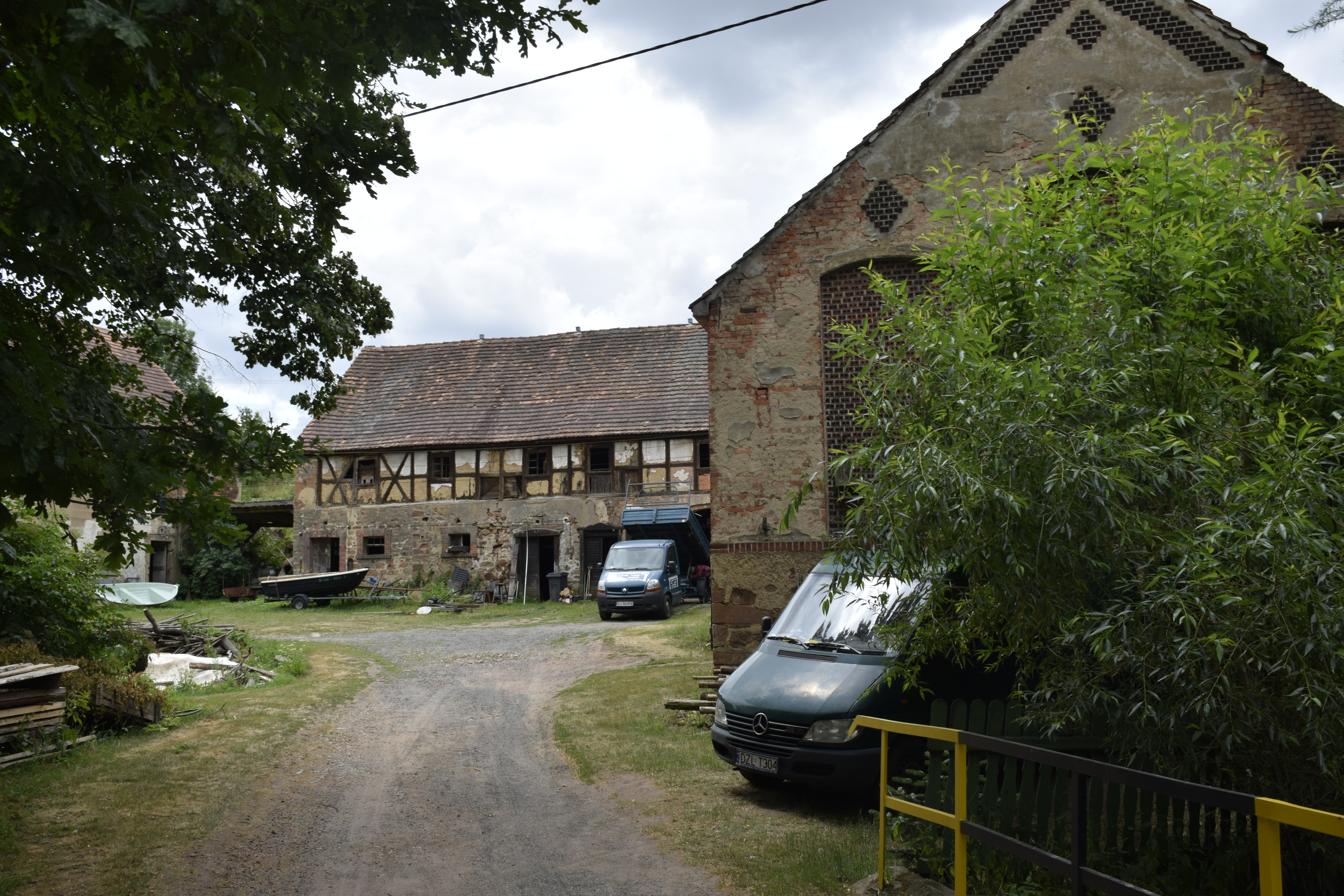
- Yard of a farm

- Location within Poland
- Coordinates: 51°03′53″N 15°54′12″E
- Country: Poland
- Voivodeship: Lower Silesian
- County: Złotoryja
- Gmina: Świerzawa

Biegoszów [bjɛˈɡɔʂuf] is a village in the administrative district of Gmina Świerzawa, within Złotoryja County, Lower Silesian Voivodeship, in south-western Poland.

== Gallery ==
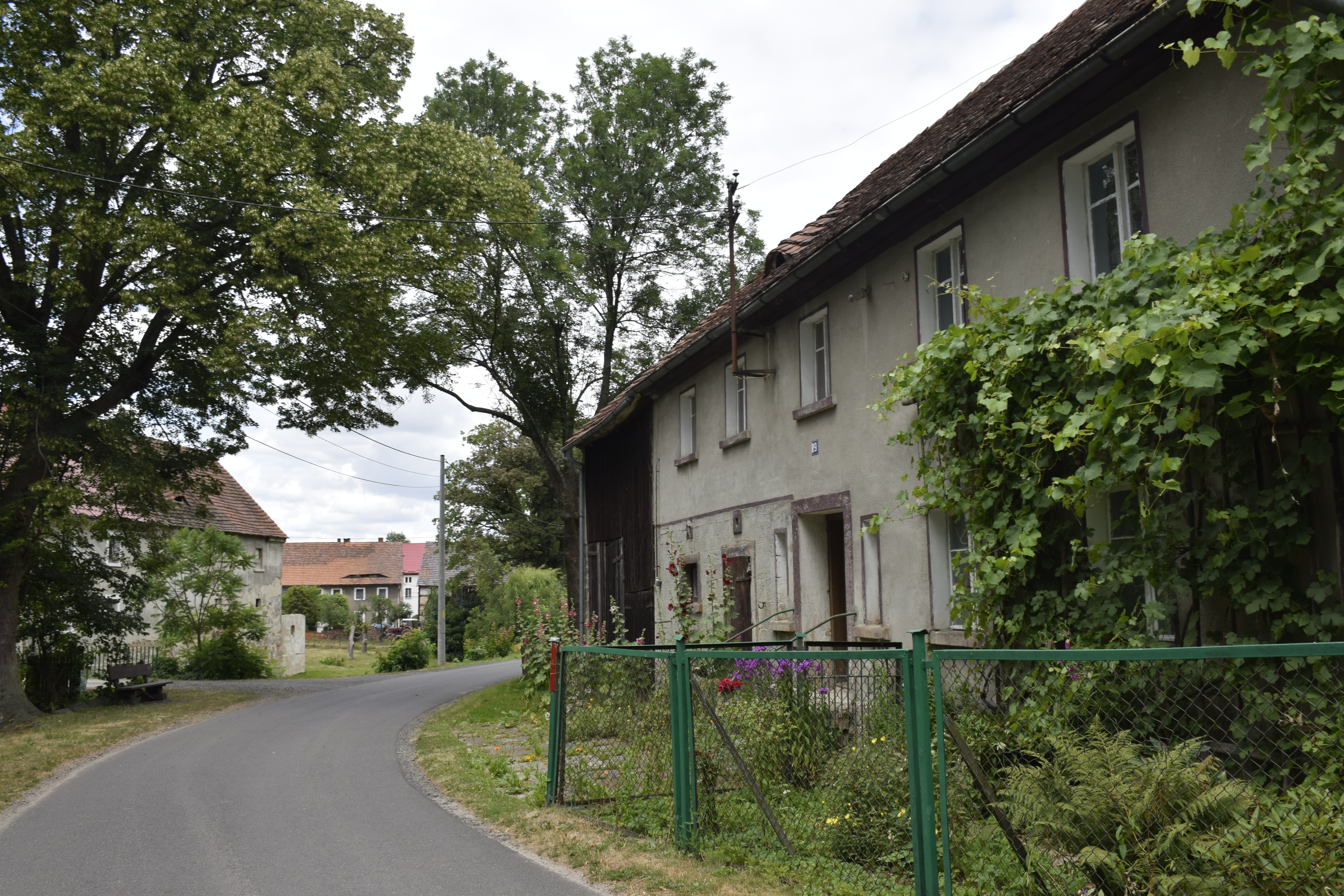
Street

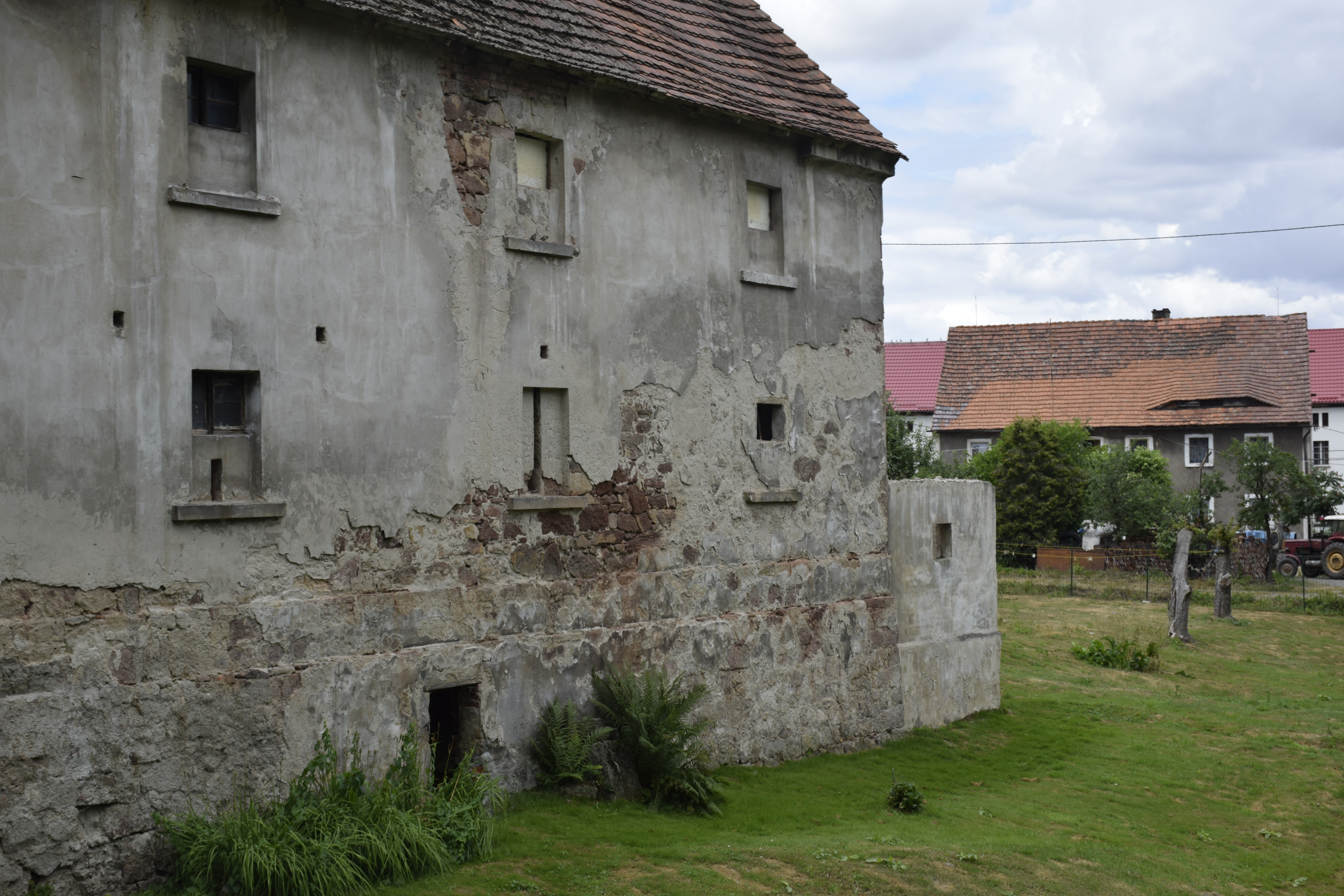
Old house

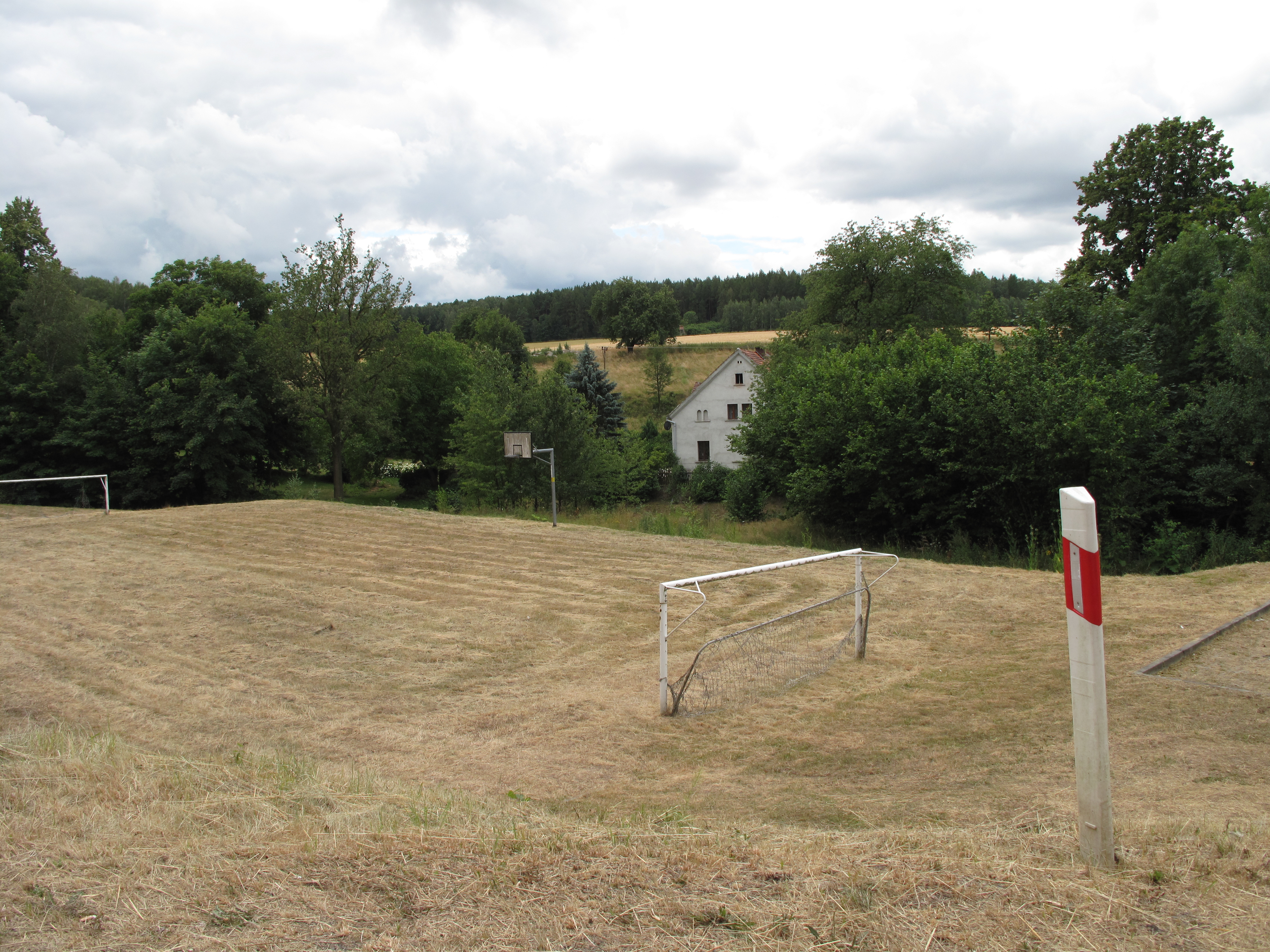
Soccer field

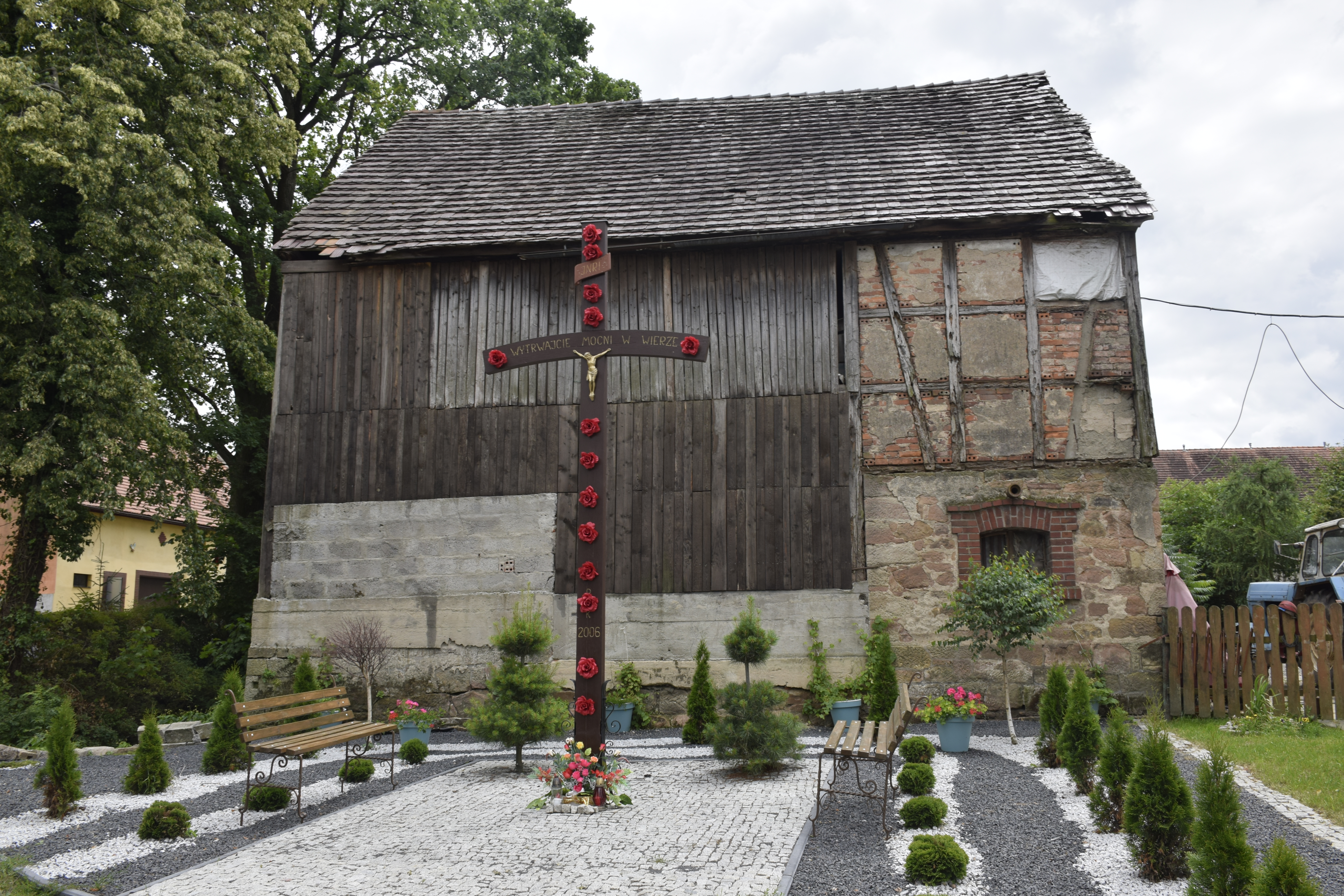
A cross with a house behind
