= Gozdno, Lower Silesian Voivodeship =

Gozdno
- Village
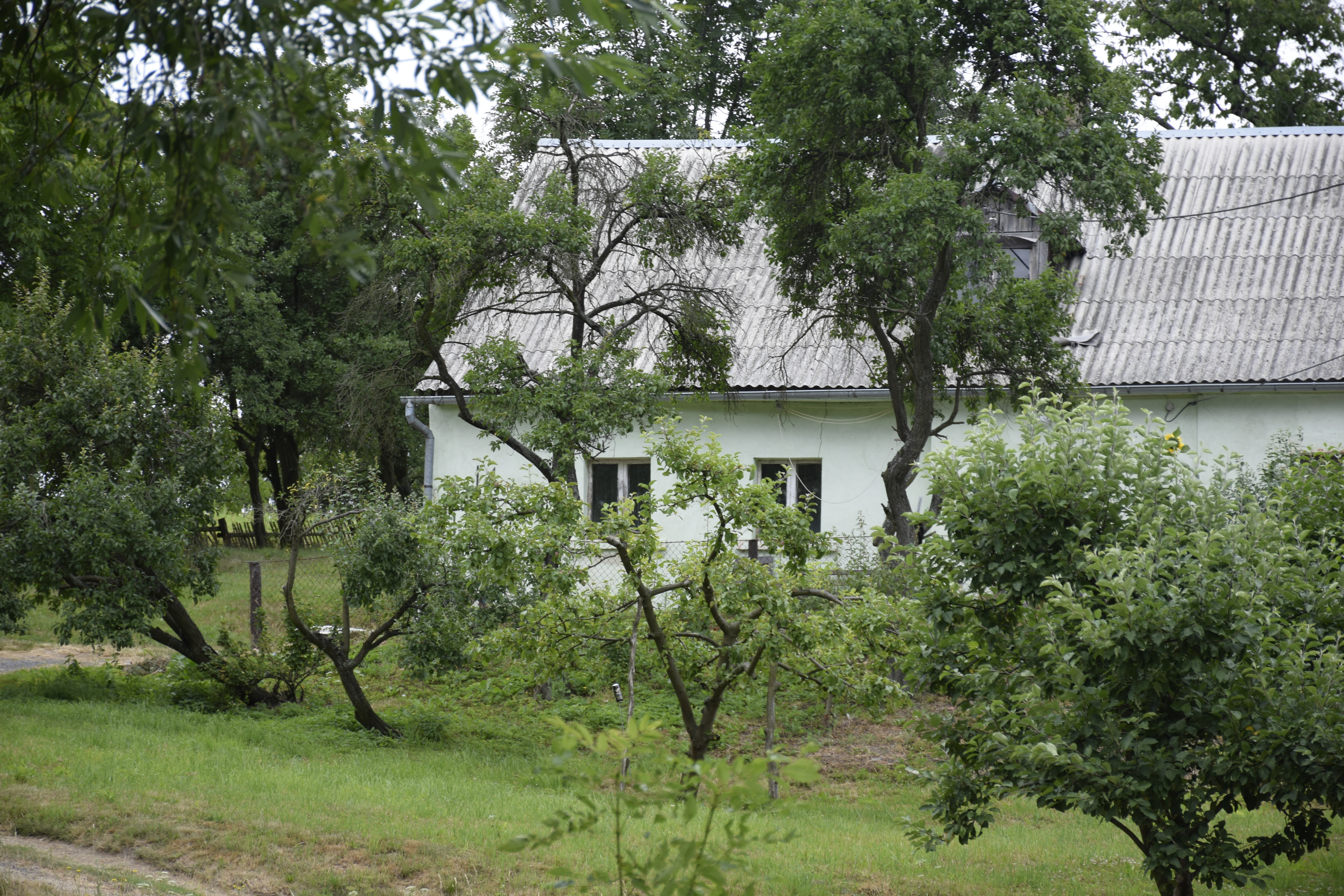
- White house

- Location within Poland
- Coordinates: 51°03′06″N 15°54′52″E
- Country: Poland
- Voivodeship: Lower Silesian
- County: Złotoryja
- Gmina: Świerzawa

Gozdno [ˈɡɔzdnɔ] is a village in the administrative district of Gmina Świerzawa, within Złotoryja County, Lower Silesian Voivodeship, in south-western Poland.

== Gallery ==
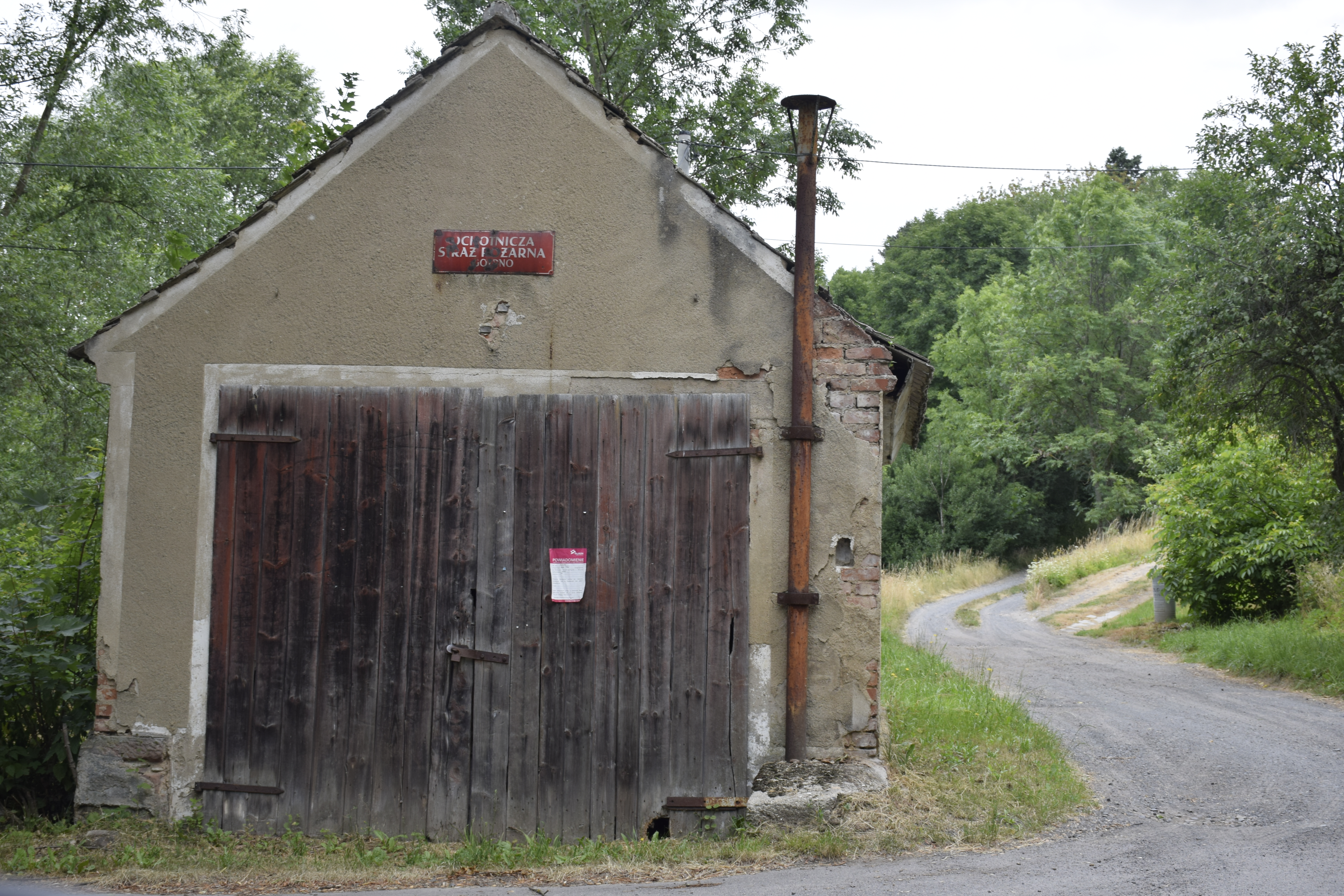
Old fire station

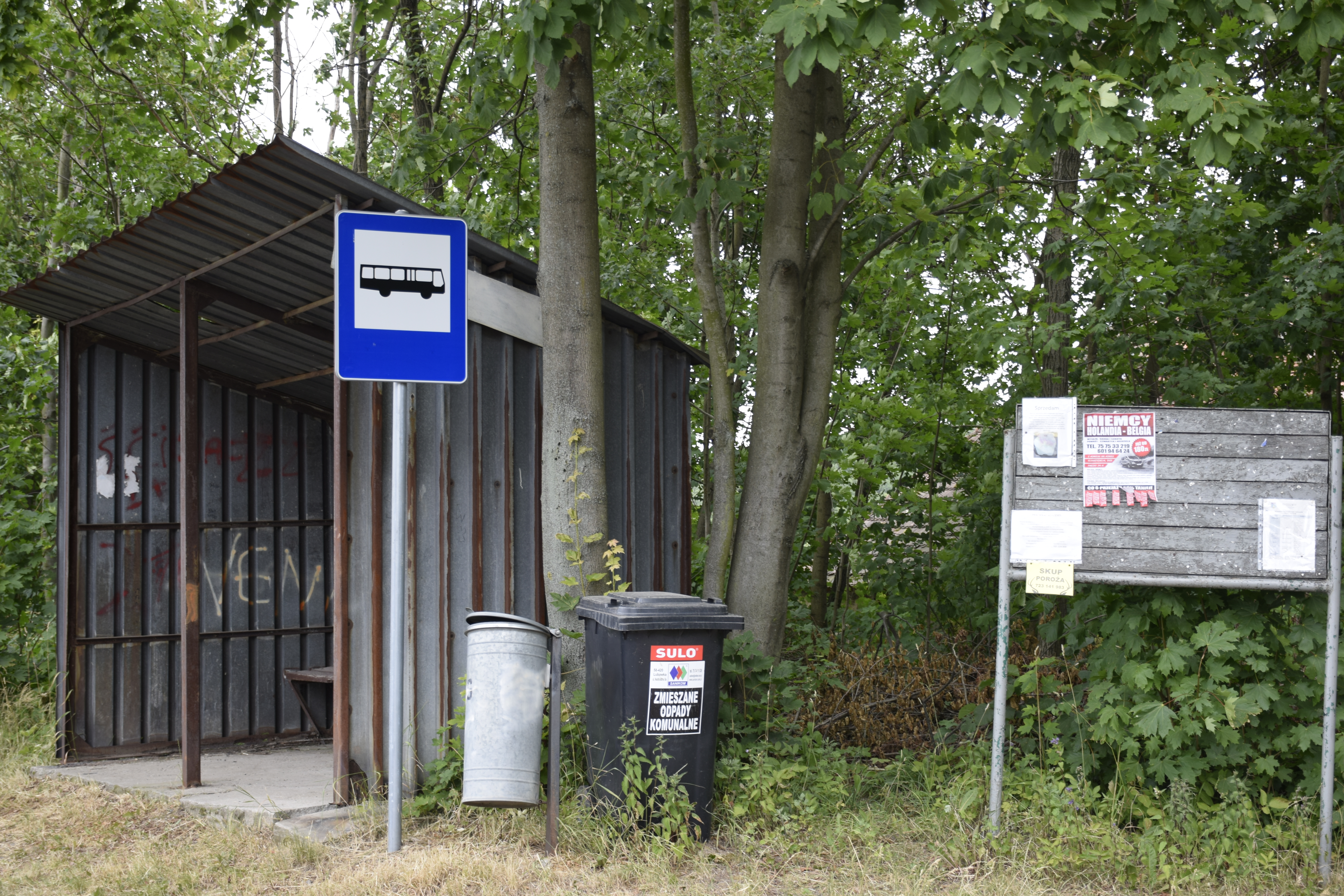
Bus stop with a shelter

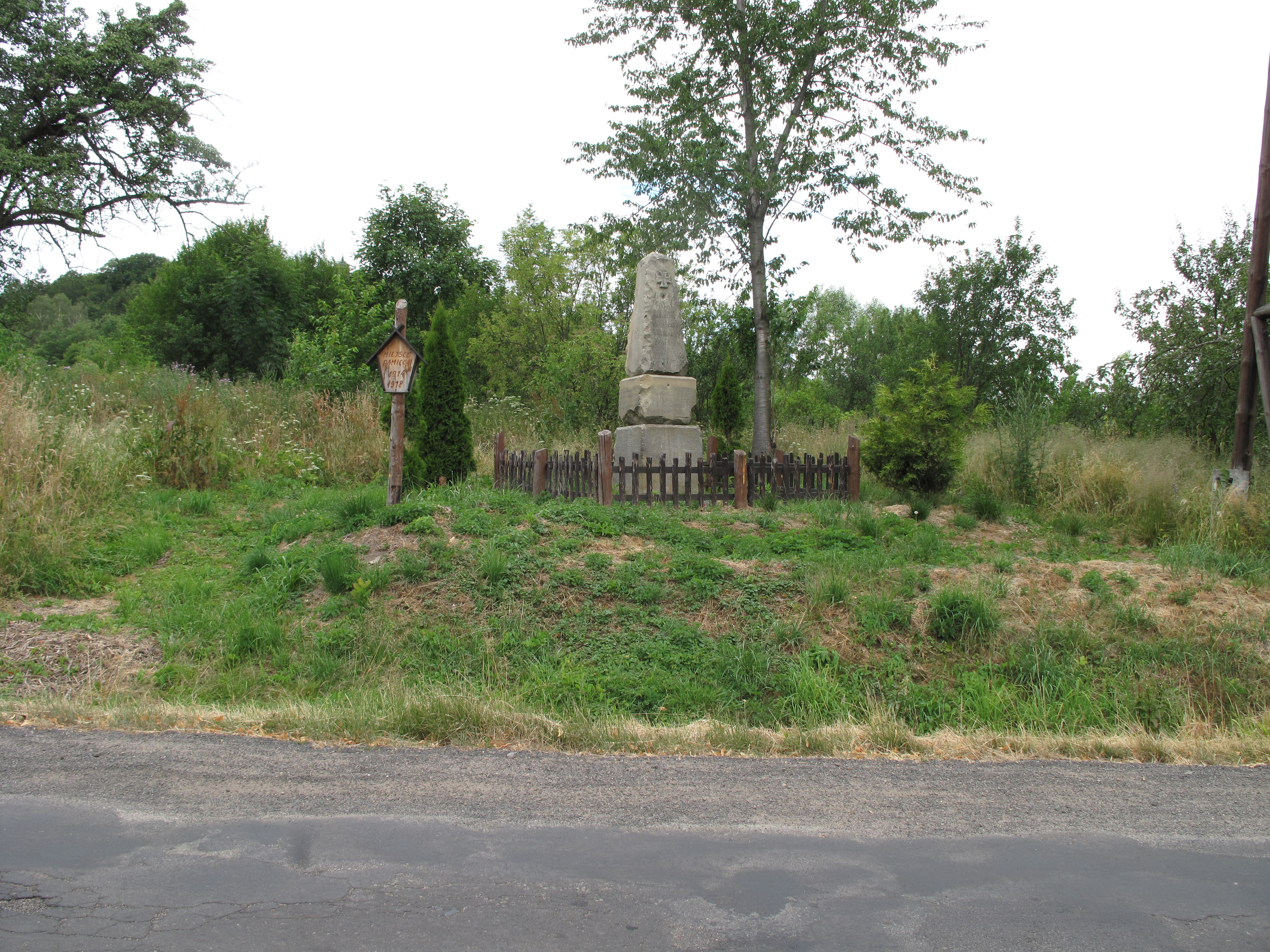
World War I memorial
