= Rzeszówek, Lower Silesian Voivodeship =

Rzeszówek
- Village
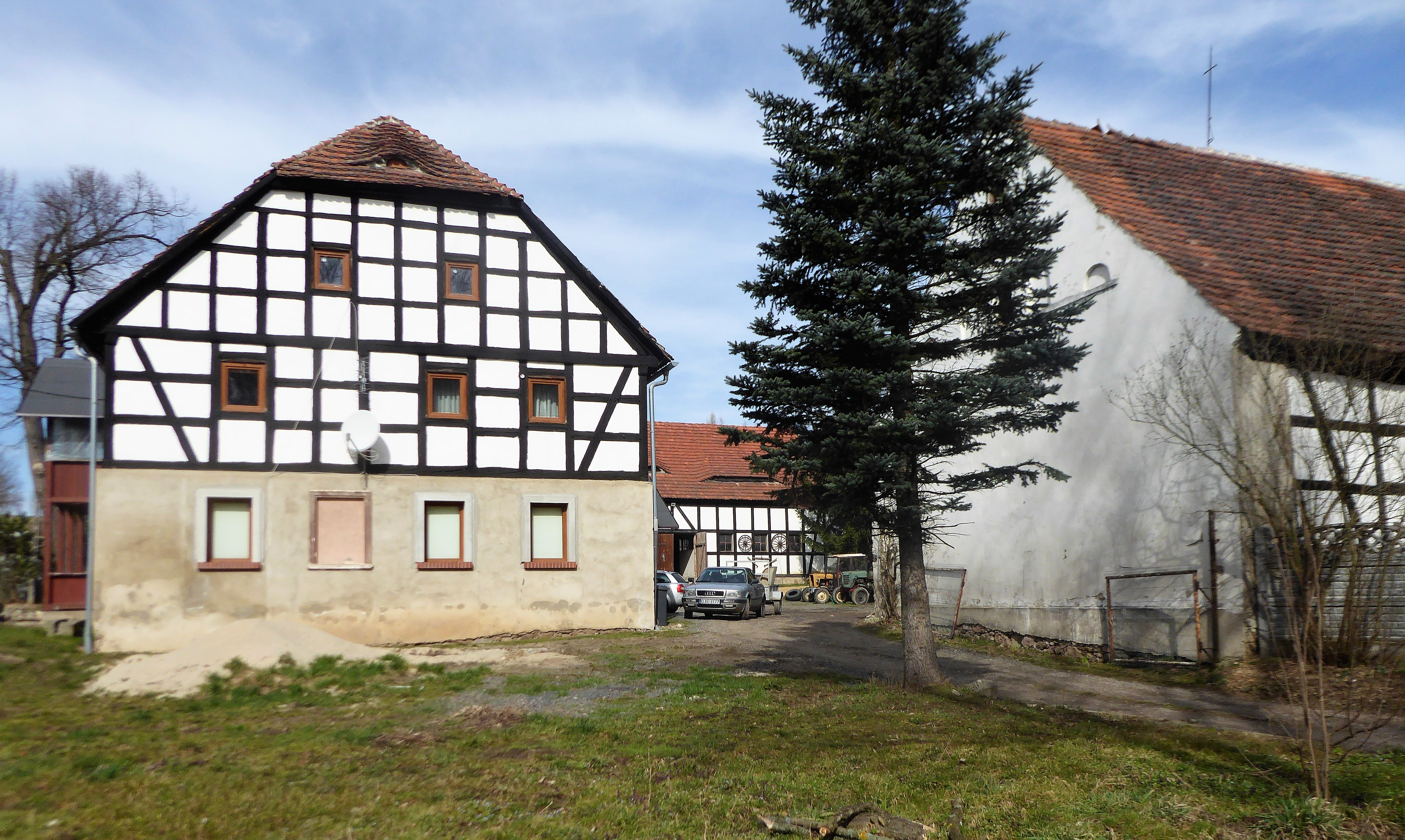

- Location within Poland
- Coordinates: 51°1′N 15°56′E
- Country: Poland
- Voivodeship: Lower Silesian
- County: Złotoryja
- Gmina: Świerzawa

Rzeszówek ([ʐɛˈʂuvɛk]) (German: Reichwaldau) is a village in the administrative district of Gmina Świerzawa, within Złotoryja County, Lower Silesian Voivodeship, in south-western Poland.
