= Podgórki, Lower Silesian Voivodeship =

Podgórki
- Village
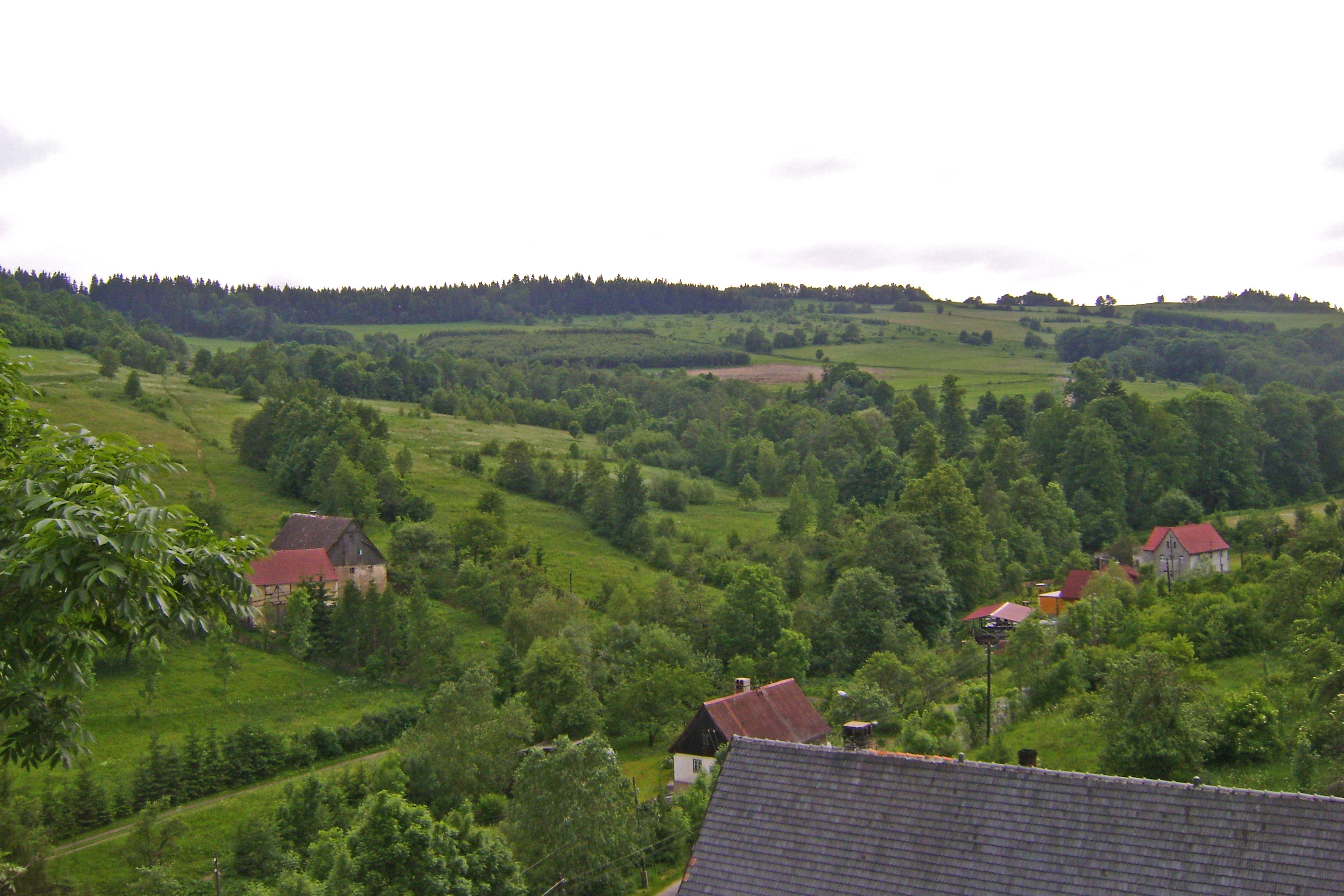

- Location within Poland
- Coordinates: 50°57′24″N 15°51′12″E
- Country: Poland
- Voivodeship: Lower Silesian
- County: Złotoryja
- Gmina: Świerzawa

Podgórki [pɔdˈɡurki] is a village in the administrative district of Gmina Świerzawa, within Złotoryja County, Lower Silesian Voivodeship, in south-western Poland.
