= Brennik =

Brennik may refer to the following places in Poland:

- Brennik in Gmina Złotoryja, Złotoryja County in Lower Silesian Voivodeship (SW Poland)
- Other places called Brennik (listed in Polish Wikipedia)
