= Kopacz =

Kopacz may refer to:

- Kopacz, Lower Silesian Voivodeship, a village in Lower Silesian Voivodeship, south-west Poland
- Kopacz (surname)
- the Kopacz coat of arms
