= Johann Sigismund Scholze =

Silesian poet

Johann Sigismund Scholze alias Sperontes (20 March 1705 in Lobendau bei Liegnitz, Silesia, Bohemia (today Lubiatów near Złotoryja) 28 September 1750 in Leipzig) was a Silesian music anthologist and poet.

== Life ==
Little is known about the life of Scholze. He was the son of a clerk, and attended school in Liegnitz until the beginning of his studies in Leipzig. In 1729 he was in Leipzig, where on 3 January, he got married with the widow from Halle, with whom he had begun a relationship. The children died young. Only one survived him. His wife died on 12 February 1738. His own funeral in poorer shape was on 30 September 1750. Stolze published under the pseudonym of Sperontes. We owe the discovery of the real identity of the poet to the musicologist Philipp Spitta, who published in 1885 a fundamental work Sperontes.

== Works ==
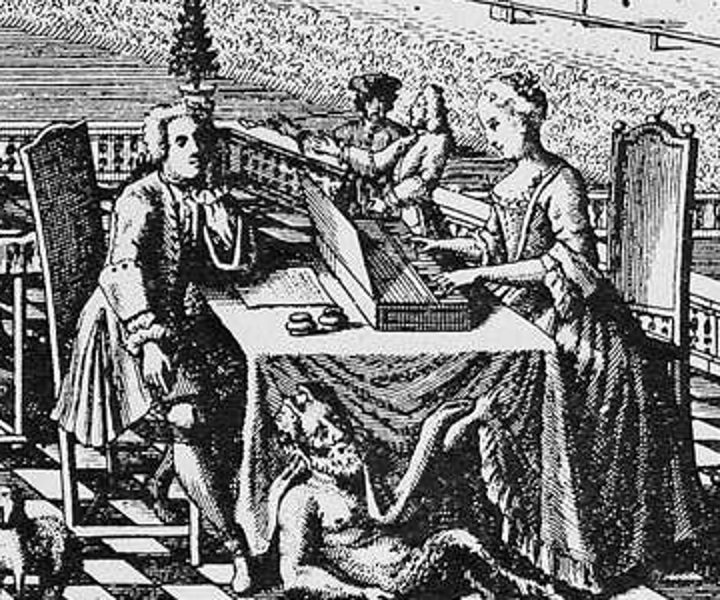
Detail from the title page to Singende Muse an der Pleisse, a collection of strophic songs published in Leipzig in 1736, by Johann Sigismund Scholze.

- Sperontes, singende Muse an der Pleisse, Leipzig, 1736
- Das Kätzgen, ein Schäferspiel, Leipzig 1746
- Die Kirms, Leipzig 1746
- Das Strumpfband, Leipzig 1748
- Der Frühling
- Der Winter

== Sources ==
- Robert L. Marshall and Dianne M. McMullen's article in new Grove Dictionary of Music
- P. Spitta: 'Sperontes "Singende Muse an der Pleisse": zur Geschichte des deutschen Hausgesanges im 18. Jahrhundert', 1885
- A. Kopp: 'Gedichte von Günther und Sperontes im Volksgesang', Zeitschrift für deutsche Philologie, xxvii, 1895
- J.W. Smeed: German Song and its Poetry, 1740–1900, 1987
- S. Kross: Geschichte des deutschen Liedes, 1989)
