= Złotoryja =

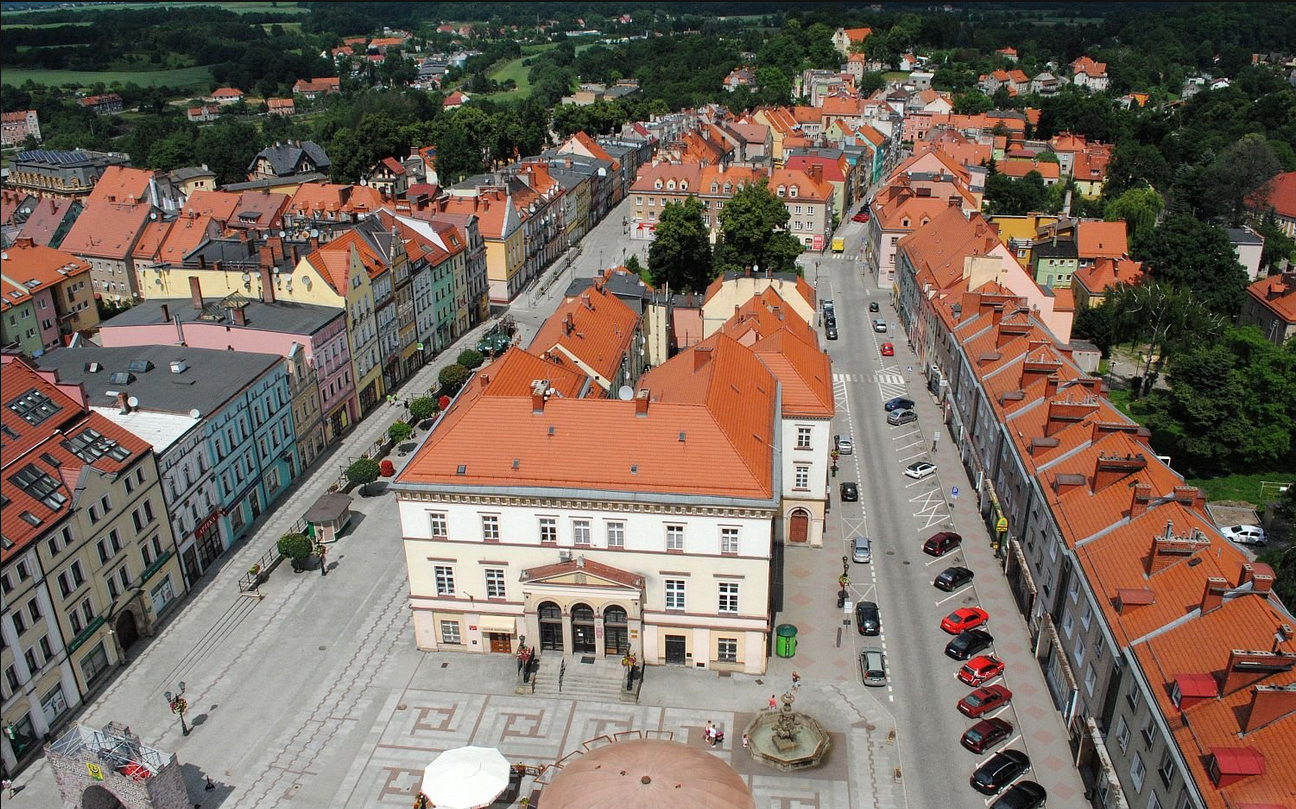
- View of Old Town and marketplace

- Flag Coat of arms
- Nickname: Stolica Polskiego Złota; Capital of Polish Gold
- Location within Poland
- Coordinates: 51°8′N 15°55′E
- Country: Poland
- Voivodeship: Lower Silesian
- County: Złotoryja
- Gmina: Złotoryja (urban gmina)
- Established: 12th century
- Town rights: 1211

Government
  - Mayor: Paweł Kulig

Area
  - Total: 11.51 km^{2} (4.44 sq mi)

Population (2019-06-30)
  - Total: 15,564
  - Density: 1,352/km^{2} (3,502/sq mi)
- Time zone: UTC+1 (CET)
  - Summer (DST): UTC+2 (CEST)
- Postal code: 59-500 to 59-501
- Area code: +48 76
- Car plates: DZL
- Website: http://www.zlotoryja.pl

Złotoryja (Polish pronunciation: [zwɔtɔˈrɨja]; German: Goldberg, German pronunciation: [ˈɡɔltˌbɛʁk]; Latin: Aureus Mons, Aurum) is a historic town in Lower Silesian Voivodeship in southwestern Poland, the administrative seat of Złotoryja County, and of the smaller Gmina Złotoryja. Złotoryja is the first town in Poland to be granted town privileges, in 1211,. Since the Middle Ages, it was a centre of gold and copper mining. Złotoryja was also featured among the most beautiful towns in Poland due to its location and architectural heritage.

== Geography ==
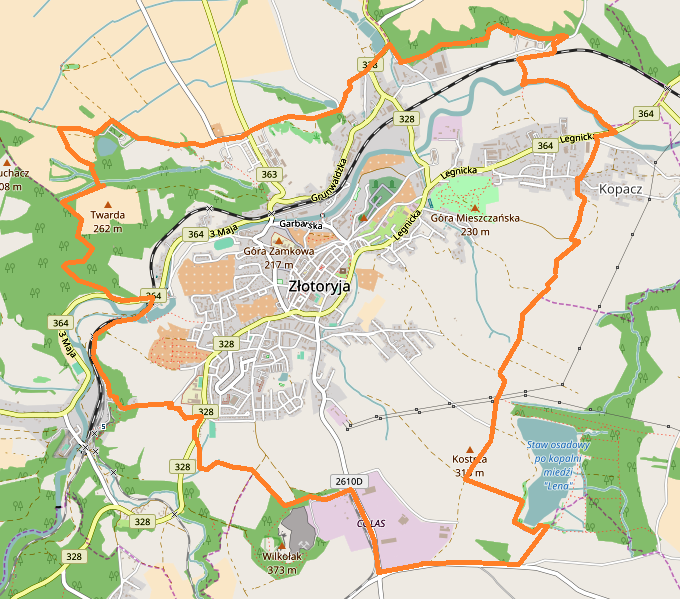
City map

The town is located in the historic Lower Silesia region on the right bank of the Kaczawa river, about 20 km (12 mi) southwest of Legnica. In the south, the Kaczawskie Mountains stretch up to the Karkonosze range of the Western Sudetes. According to the Central Statistical Office data, as of January 2023, the city had 14,337 inhabitants and is one of the important centres of basalt mining.

== Town's name ==
During its long existence Złotoryja was referred to by various names. Since the Middle Ages it was referred to as either Aurum (Latin for "gold"), Aureus Mons ("Golden Mountain"), Goldberg (German for "Golden Mountain") or by its Polish name. Złotoryja in Polish literally means "gold-digging", referring to historic gold-panning sites on the Kaczawa river.

== Coat of arms and flag ==
The coat of arms features a black eagle of the Silesian Piast dynasty standing over three green hills, with the golden background. Its heraldic blazon is "Or, an eagle displayed sable on a base three-invected vert". It has been used since the 15th century.

The flag features both of the heraldic colours of the coat of arms. It consists of two stripes: golden (yellow) above green.

== History ==
=== Middle Ages ===
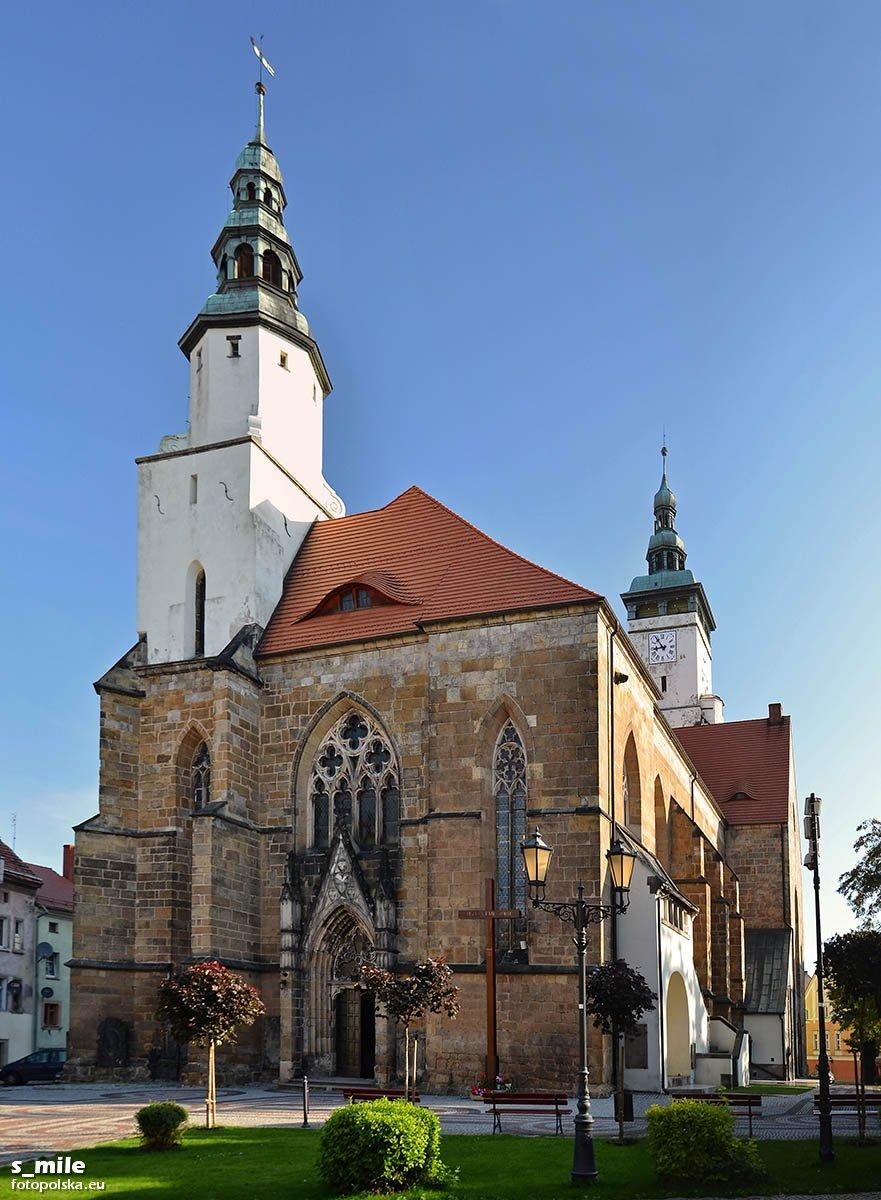
St. Mary's Church, founded by Duke Henry I the Bearded

In the early Middle Ages the region was inhabited by the tribe of Trzebowianie, one of the Polish tribes, and in the 10th century the area was included in the emerging Polish state.

In the late 12th century and early 13th century a small settlement of gold miners was founded on the slopes of Mount St. Nicholas (Góra św. Mikołaja), located at the shores of the Kaczawa river. The village grew rapidly and in 1211 it was documented as Aurum and vested with town rights according to Magdeburg law by the Piast duke Henry I the Bearded, the first city throughout then-fragmented Poland and plausibly the first Silesian town with German institutions and German settlers. Henry I financed the construction of the St. Mary's Church, which was later expanded and is now one of the town's landmarks. In the 13th century a Hospitaller and Franciscan monastery were founded in the town, which thus became one of the important cultural and religious centres of the region. During the first Mongol invasion of Poland, in 1241 many of the miners took part in the Battle of Legnica, where most of them died, but the mining quickly recovered.

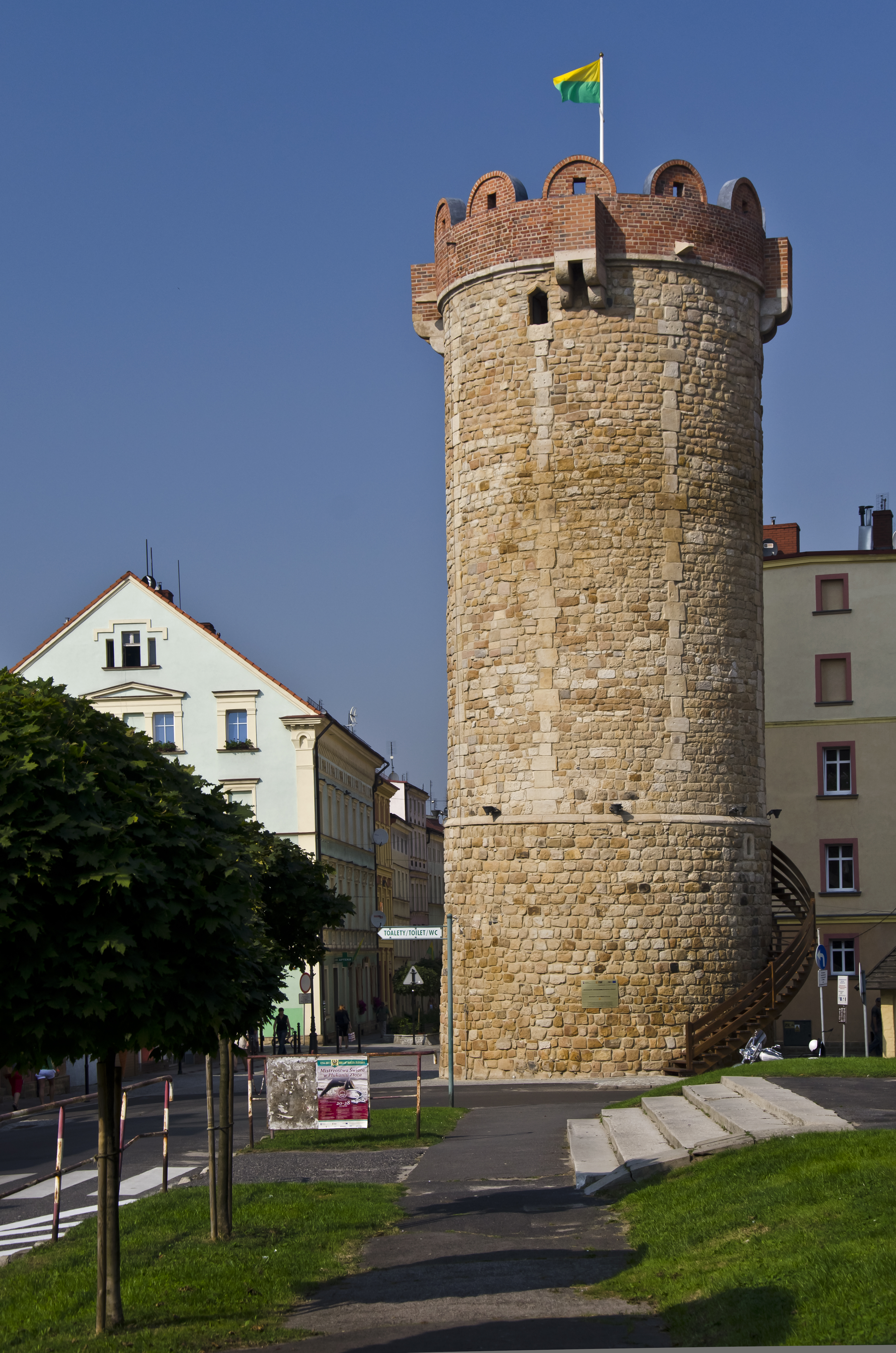
Preserved tower (Baszta Kowalska) of the historic town fortifications

During the ongoing fragmentation of Poland into smaller duchies, in 1248 the town was attached to the newly established Duchy of Legnica and in 1290 was granted with a privilege to trade salt, one of the most expensive and valuable minerals in the Middle Ages. In 1329, under the rule of Duke Bolesław III the Generous, the whole Duchy of Legnica became a fief of the Kingdom of Bohemia under King John the Blind, yet it retained its local self-government. During the 15th century Hussite Wars the town was captured by the Hussite forces in 1427, 1428 and 1431. It was severely pillaged, but it quickly recovered and the local city council decided to build city walls in order to spare the city such troubles in the future. Much of the mediaeval fortifications is preserved until today.

=== Early modern period ===
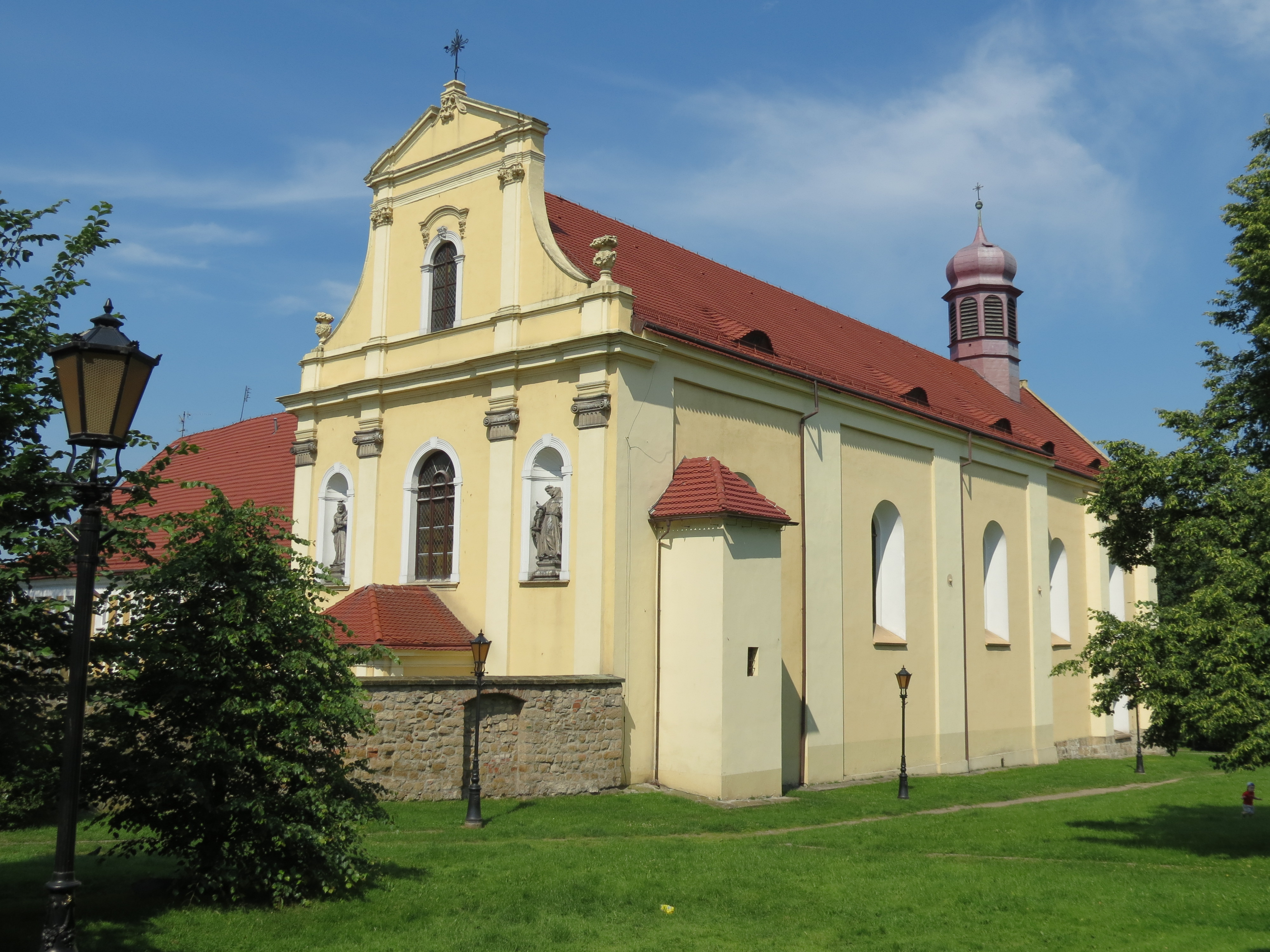
Construction of Saint Hedwig's Church began in the 15th century

Although by the early 15th century most of the gold deposits were depleted, the town started to gain significant income from the nearby Via Regia trade route linking Wrocław with Leipzig. A brewery and several weavers shops were opened soon afterwards. In 1504 a school was opened by Hieronymus Aurimontanus. In 1522 the first Protestant priests arrived and soon afterwards the school was turned into a Latin, humanistic gymnasium, the first in Silesia. One of its rectors, Valentin Trozendorf, wanted to turn it into a university and these plans were approved by Duke Frederick II of Legnica; however the prince died soon afterwards and the town was struck by a severe fire in 1554, which made the plans obsolete. Nevertheless, the school attracted students from Silesia, Greater Poland and Bohemia.

In 1526 the town together with the rest of the Bohemian crown land of Silesia came under the suzerainty of the Austrian House of Habsburg. It remained part of the Piast-ruled Duchy of Legnica until 1675. Złotoryja/Goldberg continued to prosper until 1608, when the prosperity was stopped by a major flood that killed approx. 50 of the inhabitants and damaged large part of the city. Five years later, in 1613 the town yet again was struck by great fire that destroyed 571 houses. To help rebuild the town, in 1621 the duke of Legnica granted the right to mint coins, a privilege the town enjoyed for two years. During the Thirty Years' War Goldberg changed hands several times and suffered especially in 1633, when Albrecht von Wallenstein, a former pupil of the gymnasium, beleaguered the city. After the war Goldberg needed almost 100 years to recover. Duke Louis IV of Legnica granted new privileges aiming to help the town prosper through the development of cloth production.

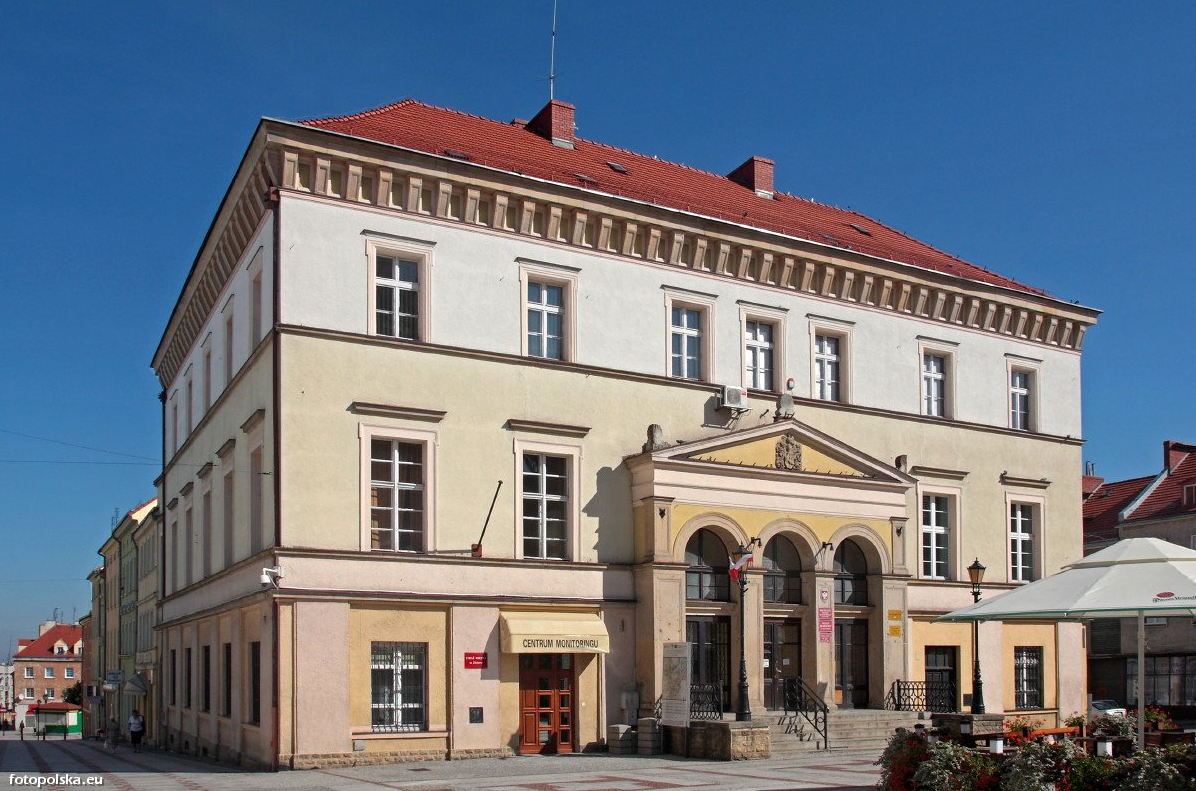
Classicist Town Hall at the Market Square

After the dissolution of the Piast Duchy of Legnica in 1675, the town was integrated with the Bohemian (Czech) Kingdom. After it came under the authority of the Czech kings, in 1676 Leopold I confirmed all privileges, and in 1688 allowed the organization of an annual fair. In 1742 it was annexed by the Kingdom of Prussia in the First Silesian War.

=== Late modern period ===
During the Napoleonic Wars and Polish national liberation fights, in May 1807, Polish uhlans passed through the town. In 1810 the Prussian administration closed down the Bernardine monastery. On August 26, 1813, the armies of French marshal Macdonald was defeated near the town by the forces of Prussian general von Blücher (see Combat of Goldberg).

In 1848 riots and looting took place, and in 1849 an epidemic broke out. Goldberg became part of the newly formed German Empire in 1871 and at the end of the 19th century the town started to recover after almost 200 years of crisis. In 1884 the town was connected to Liegnitz (Legnica) by a railroad, and by 1906 two additional lines were opened: to Świerzawa and Chojnów. In 1900 the first telephone line was started. At the same time various companies tried to recover the gold mining in and around the city, but the plans were soon abandoned. Instead the copper ore mines were opened, but they faced serious financial difficulties by the end of the 1920s. During the 1933 Reichstag elections about 25% of the inhabitants backed the Nazi Party.

Historical population
Year	Pop.	±%
1816	5,621	—
1825	6,399	+13.8%
1871	6,718	+5.0%
1880	6,460	−3.8%
1890	6,437	−0.4%
1900	6,518	+1.3%
1910	6,988	+7.2%
1925	7,110	+1.7%
1933	7,842	+10.3%
1939	7,860	+0.2%
1946	4,613	−41.3%
1950	5,305	+15.0%
1960	10,856	+104.6%
1992	17,200	+58.4%
2003	17,069	−0.8%
2006	16,503	−3.3%

=== World War II and recent history ===
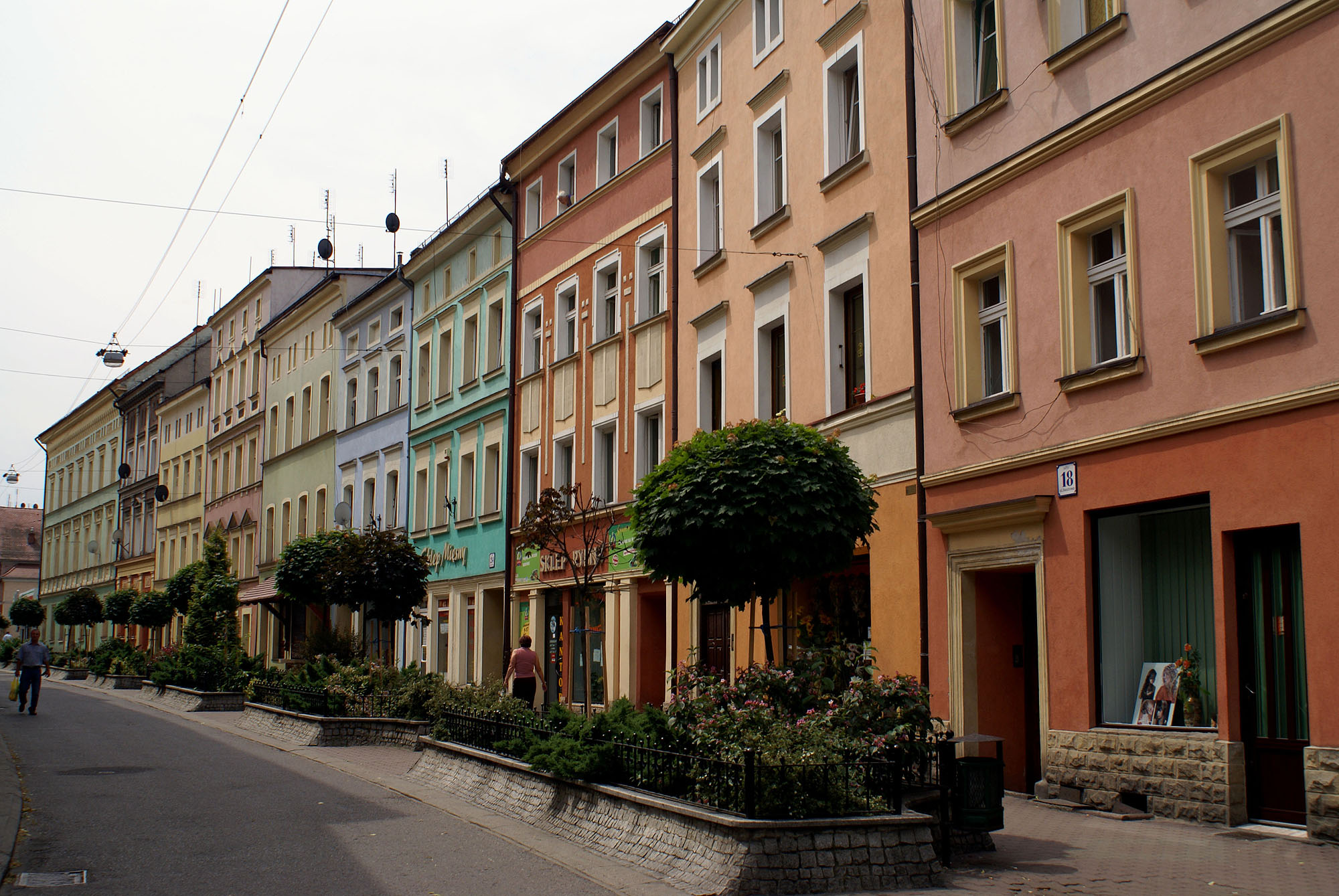
Basztowa Street in the Old Town

During World War II, the Germans created two branches of the Stalag VIII-A prisoner-of-war camp and two forced labour camps in the town. Among the prisoners were mainly Poles, French and Italians. On 5 February 1945, a German-organized death march of Allied prisoners of war from the Stalag Luft 7 POW camp reached the town, and the POWs were afterwards transported in cattle wagons to the Stalag III-A camp in Luckenwalde. The town survived the war almost untouched. In February 1945 it was captured by the forces of the Red Army 2nd Ukrainian Front under Ivan Konev. Following the decisions of the Potsdam Conference, in May 1945, the town was transferred back to Poland and restored to its historic Polish name, Złotoryja. By 1949, most of the local German population had either fled or were expelled in accordance with the Potsdam Agreement.

In the nearby villages of Wilków and Nowy Kościół two important copper mines were founded and a large number of local engineers also participated in the development of the industrial region of Legnica. However, in the early 1970s the mines were closed down because ore deposits of much higher quality were found around Lubin.

Many factories were founded, including a shoe factory, Christmas tree ornaments factory and a basalt mine. Since 1989 the town of Złotoryja started to look for its past. The historical old town was restored and the traditions of gold mining were started. In 1992 a local Polish Guild of Gold Prospectors was started, which ever since organises the Polish Gold Panning Championships. In 2000 World Championships were held there.

Currently the town is one of the main tourist centres of the area. The heavy industry is also playing an important part in the development of the area. The local quarries are ones of the most profitable in Poland and the Christmas tree ornaments factory is exporting millions of ornaments every year, mostly to Western Europe and the United States.

== Main sights ==
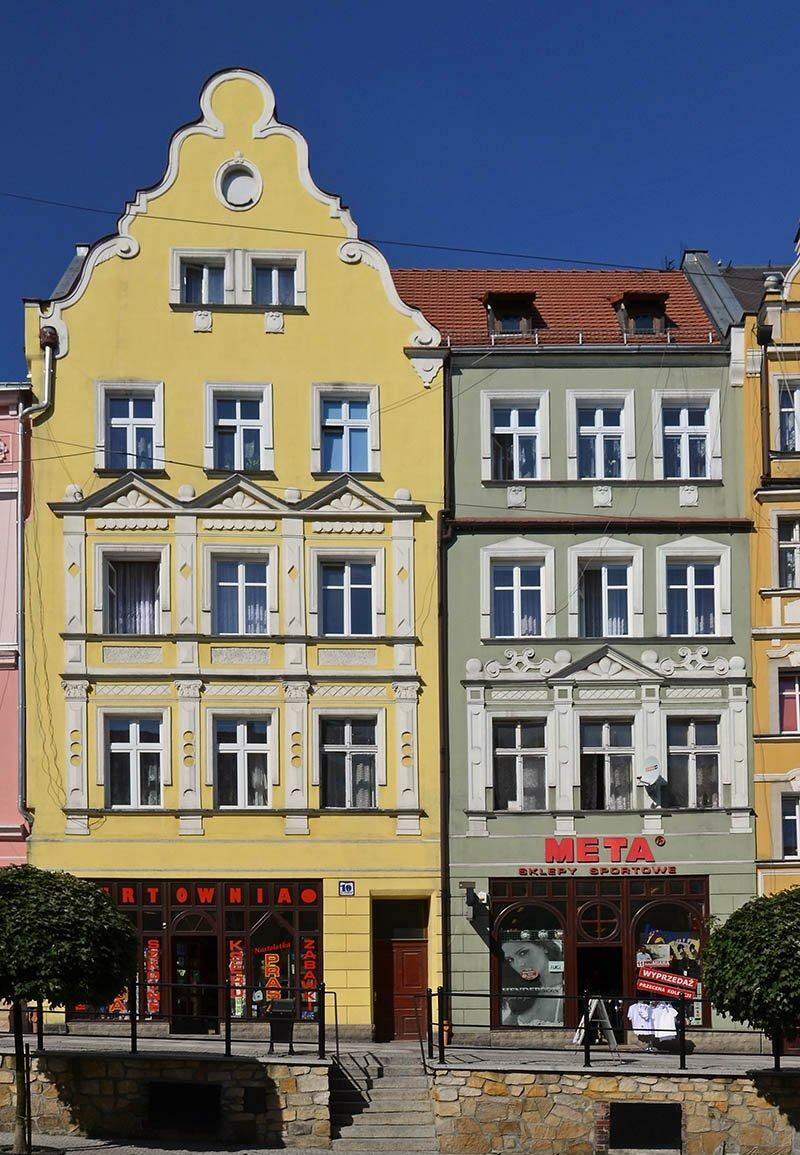
Tenements at the Market Square

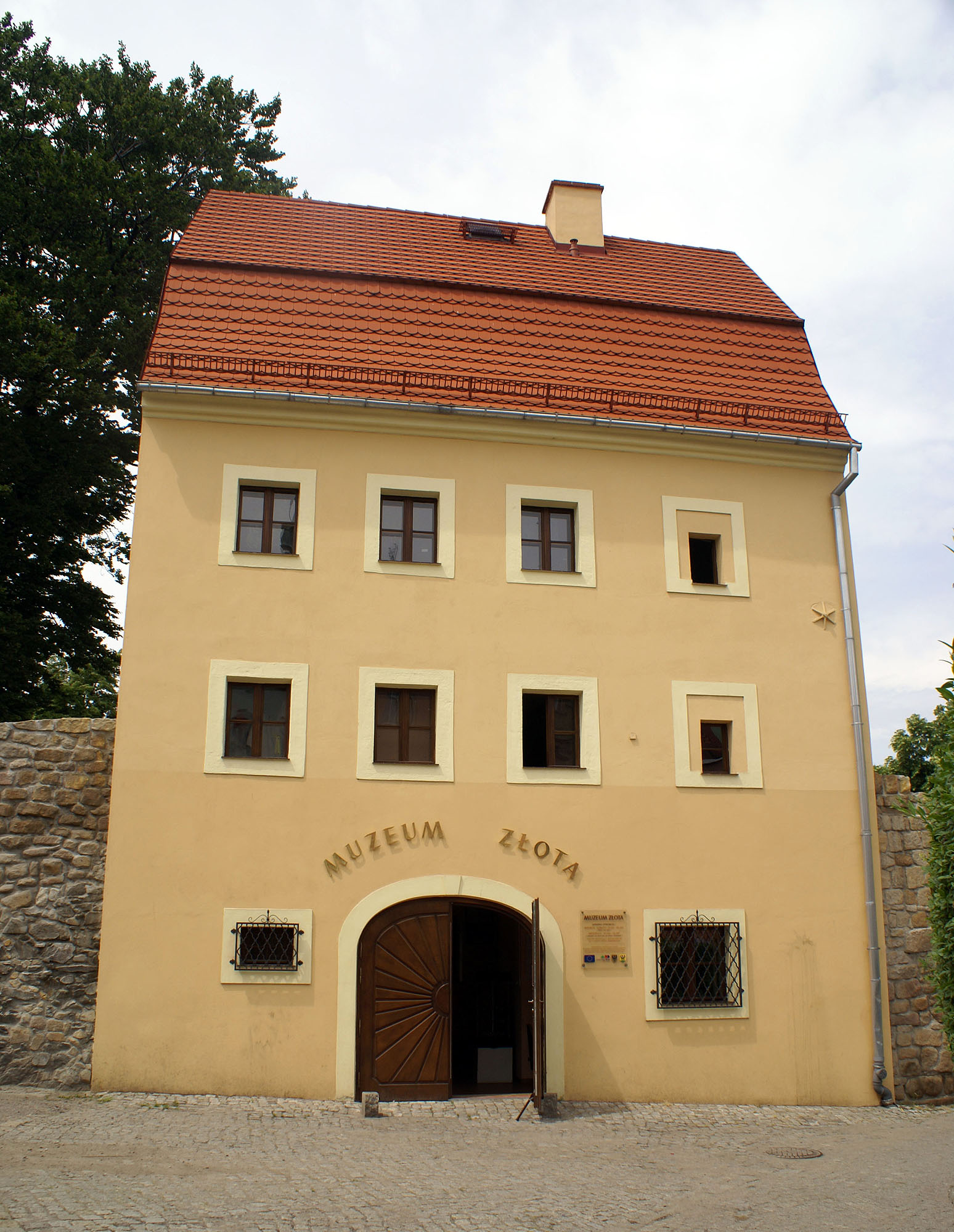
Gold Mining Museum

- Market Square (Rynek) filled with picturesque townhouses and the Neoclassical town hall
- St. Mary's Church, built in Romanesque and Gothic styles, founded by Duke Henry I the Bearded, is Złotoryja's most valuable historic building and one of the city's most recognizable landmarks
- 14th-century city walls
  - Blacksmiths Tower (Baszta Kowalska)
- St. Hedwig's Church
- Holy Cross Church (commonly referred to as St. Nicholas's Church)
- Fountains
- Gold Mining Museum, formerly the "Muzeum Złota w Złotoryi" ("Złotoryja's Gold Museum") now the "Muzeum Społeczne Ziemi Złotoryjskiej" ("Museum of the Złotoryja Land Society")
- Wilcza Góra reserve

== Transport ==
Złotoryja lies at the intersection of vovoideship roads 382, 364 and 328.

The nearest railway station is in Chojnów to the north.

== Notable people ==
- Valentin Trozendorf (1490–1556), Protestant pedagogue and theologian
- Johann Wilhelm Oelsner (1766–1848), educator, industrialist
- Ernst Zinner (1886–1970), astronomer
- Wilhelm Gliese (1915–1993), astronomer
- Mariusz Szczygieł (born 1966), journalist and writer, winner of the 2019 Nike Award

== Twin towns – sister cities ==
Złotoryja is twinned with:

- Buchach, Ukraine
- Mimoň, Czech Republic
- Pulsnitz, Germany
- Westerburg, Germany
