= Jerzmanice-Zdrój =

- Village
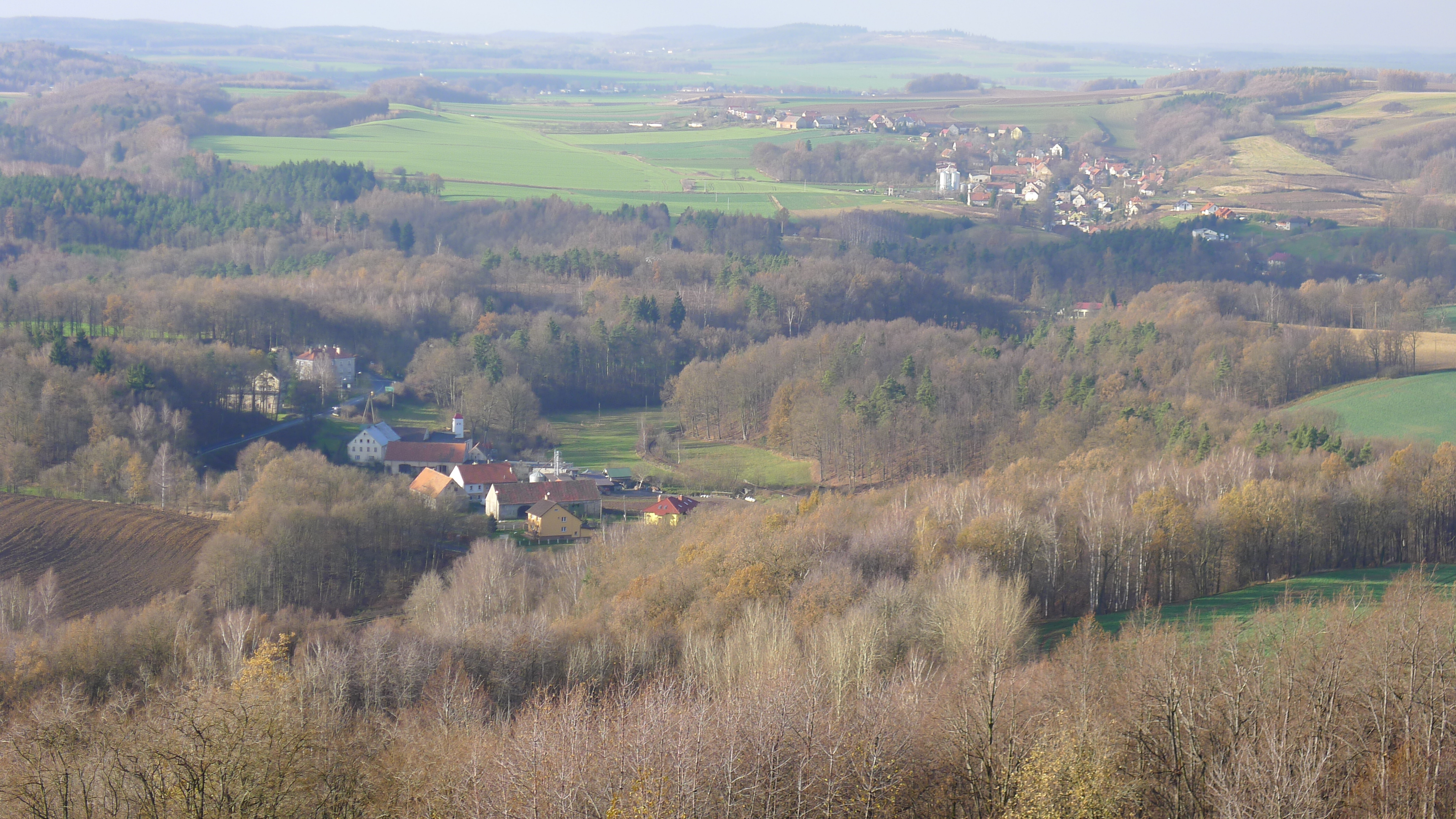
- Jerzmanice-Zdrój seen from Wilcza Góra

- Location within Poland
- Coordinates: 51°06′57″N 15°52′23″E
- Country: Poland
- Voivodeship: Lower Silesian
- County: Złotoryja
- Gmina: Złotoryja
- Population: 770

Jerzmanice-Zdrój [jɛʐmaˈnit͡sɛ ˈzdrui̯] is a village in south-western Poland. It is a part of Gmina Złotoryja, within Złotoryja County, Lower Silesian Voivodeship. Between 1975 and 1999 it was a part of Legnica Voivodeship.

== History ==
The first footsteps of the presence of the people are from the Neolithic Age. Over the centuries the village has had a church from 14th century (between 1527 and 1945 used by Protestants), rectory, two palaces (the first existed between 1541 and 1974 and the second one existed between 1904/06 and 1945), a few manors, a smithy (existing since the year 1714), watermill, inn, three taverns, weaving, grange and leat. Between 1881 and 1940/45 there was a spa, where Germans escaped the children during the World War II.

== Current situation ==
Today Jerzmanice (the short and unofficial form of the name "Jerzmanice-Zdrój") is the fourth-biggest village of Gmina Złotoryja. The population is about 770 people. The village administrator is Edward Janiec.

St. Anthony Church is used by Roman Catholic Church as a branch church of the parish Nativity of the Holy Virgin Mary in Złotoryja. In the eastern part of the village there are "Raven Rocks" - rock complex, that is about 90 million years old. Under the rocks there is a rock spring called St. Hedwig of Silesia spring. The present view of the spring is from 19th century, but firstly the spring was made probably in the 13th century. Next to the Raven Rocks there is a train station, that was opened in 1895. There is a grange in the middle of the village. It was built in the late 1890s. In 2018 a local school was closed due to reform of the education in Poland.

=== Religion ===
The majority of the population is Roman Catholic (about 90%), but only 20% practise their religion. There are few Jehovah's Witnesses and a group of Atheists.
