= Ernestynów, Lower Silesian Voivodeship =

Ernestynów
- Village
- Location within Poland
- Coordinates: 51°10′8″N 16°1′15″E
- Country: Poland
- Voivodeship: Lower Silesian
- County: Złotoryja
- Gmina: Złotoryja

Ernestynów [ɛrnɛsˈtɨnuf] is a village in the administrative district of Gmina Złotoryja, within Złotoryja County, Lower Silesian Voivodeship, in south-western Poland.
