= Wysocko =

Wysocko may refer to the following places in Poland:

- Wysocko, Lower Silesian Voivodeship (south-west Poland)
- Wysocko, Subcarpathian Voivodeship (south-east Poland)
- Wysocko, Masovian Voivodeship (east-central Poland)
