= Pyskowice, Lower Silesian Voivodeship =

Pyskowice
- Village
- Location within Poland
- Coordinates: 51°10′41″N 15°56′42″E
- Country: Poland
- Voivodeship: Lower Silesian
- County: Złotoryja
- Gmina: Złotoryja
- Time zone: UTC+1 (CET)
  - Summer (DST): UTC+2 (CEST)
- Vehicle registration: DZL

Pyskowice [pɨskɔˈvit͡sɛ] is a village in the administrative district of Gmina Złotoryja, within Złotoryja County, Lower Silesian Voivodeship, in south-western Poland.

According to linguist Heinrich Adamy, the name of the village comes from the Polish word piasek, which means "sand". Since the Middle Ages, it was part of Piast-ruled Poland. Later on, it was also part of Bohemia (Czechia), Prussia and Germany. Following Germany's defeat in World War II, in 1945, the village became again part of Poland.
