= Gierałtowiec =

- Village
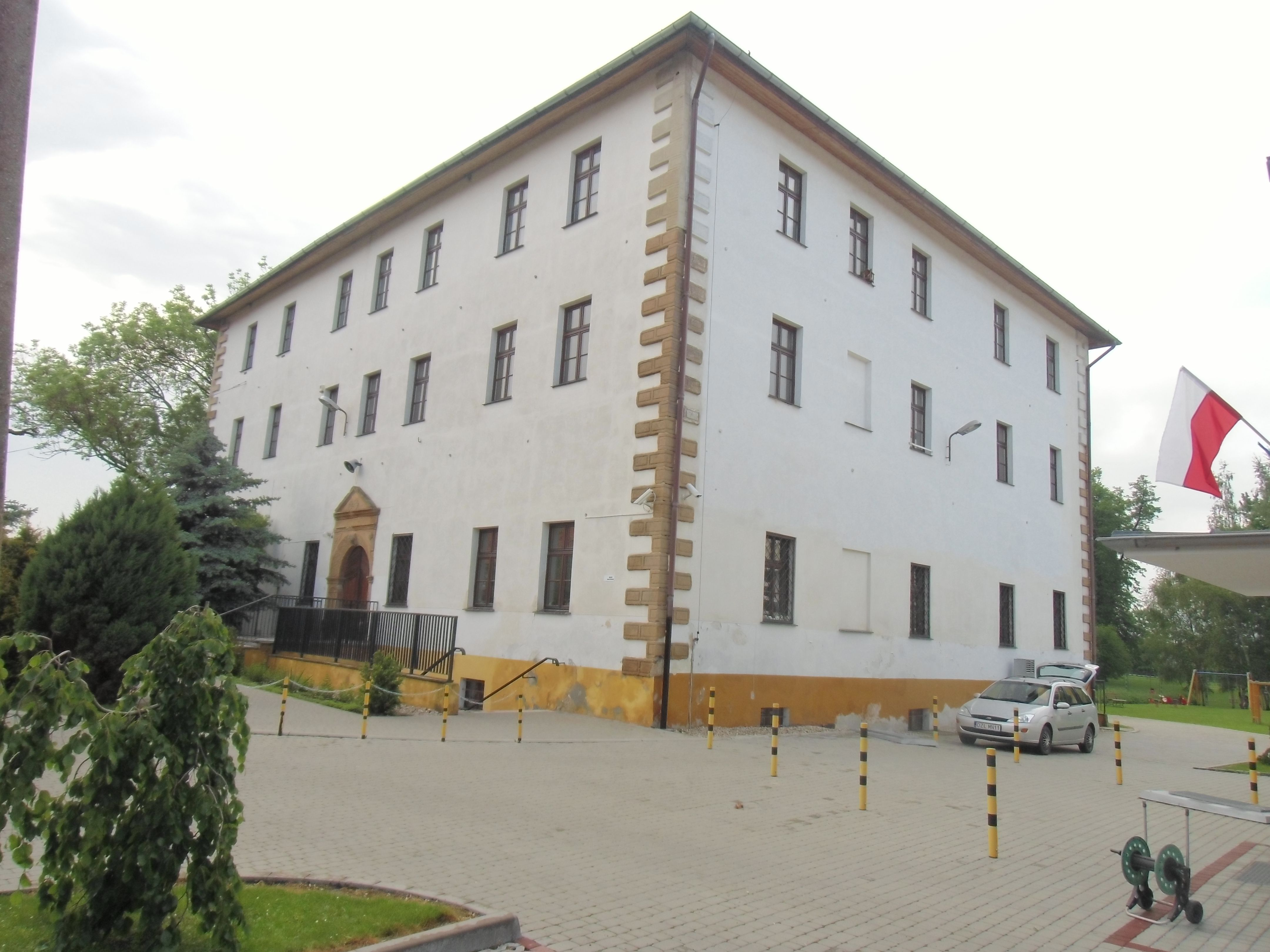
- Gierałtowiec Dwór

- Location within Poland
- Coordinates: 51°10′44″N 15°59′28″E
- Country: Poland
- Voivodeship: Lower Silesian
- County: Złotoryja
- Gmina: Złotoryja
- Population: 220

Gierałtowiec [ɡʲɛrau̯ˈtɔvjɛt͡s] is a village in the administrative district of Gmina Złotoryja, within Złotoryja County, Lower Silesian Voivodeship, in south-western Poland.
