= Łaźniki =

Łaźniki may refer to the following places in Poland:

- Łaźniki, Lower Silesian Voivodeship (south-west Poland)
- Łaźniki, Łódź Voivodeship (central Poland)
