= Wyskok =

Wyskok may refer to the following places in Poland:

- Wyskok, Lower Silesian Voivodeship (south-west Poland)
- Wyskok, Warmian-Masurian Voivodeship (north Poland)
