= Podolany, Lower Silesian Voivodeship =

Podolany
- Village
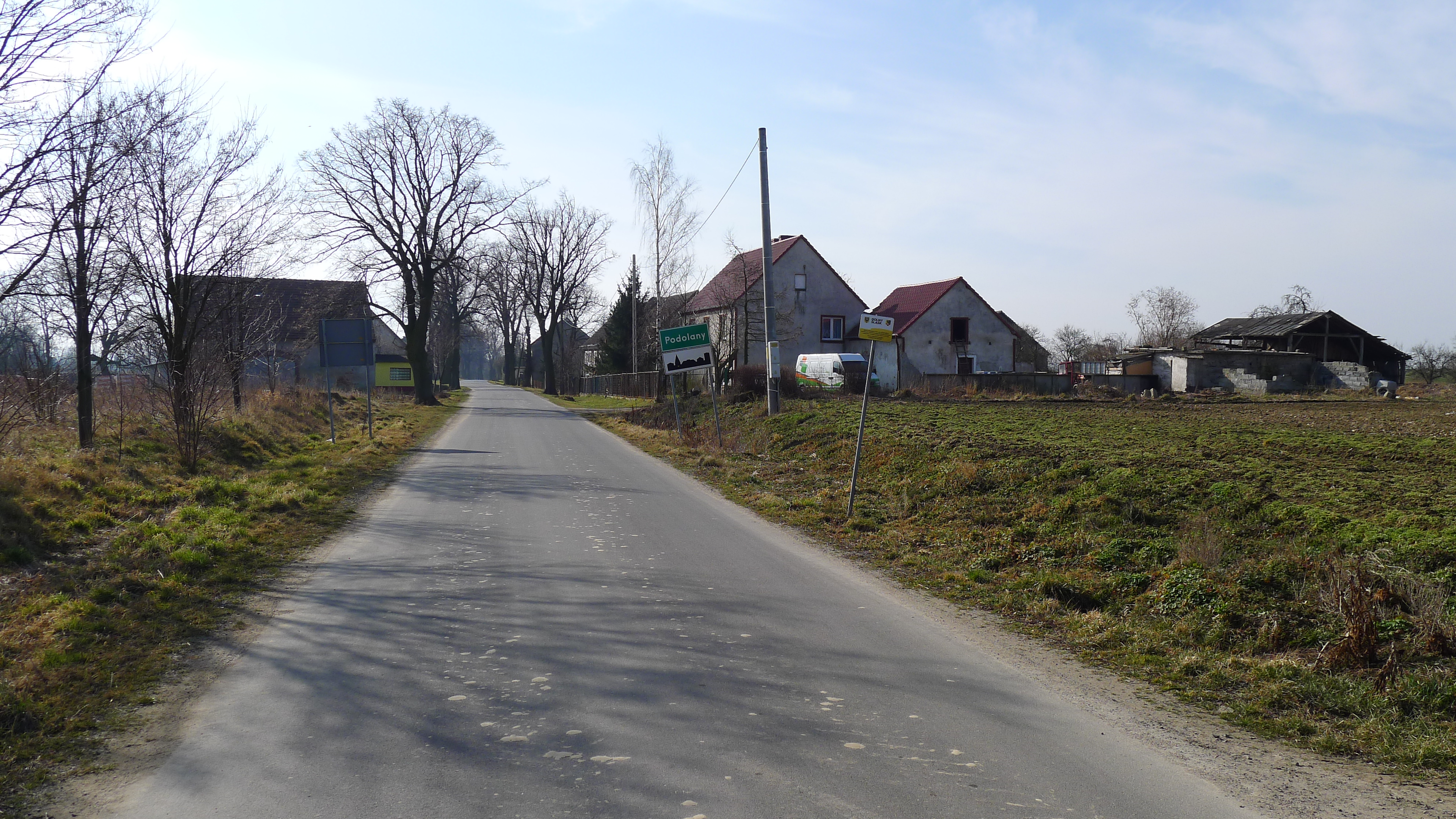
- Podolany - wjazd do wsi od strony Strupic

- Location within Poland
- Coordinates: 51°11′18″N 15°57′50″E
- Country: Poland
- Voivodeship: Lower Silesian
- County: Złotoryja
- Gmina: Złotoryja

Podolany [pɔdɔˈlanɨ] is a village in the administrative district of Gmina Złotoryja, within Złotoryja County, Lower Silesian Voivodeship, in south-western Poland.
