= Ambrosius Kühnel =

German organist and music publisher (1771–1813)

- Born: Ambrosius Kühnel c. 1771; Lubiatów, Złotoryja County, Poland
- Died: 19 August 1813; Leipzig, Saxony, Germany
- Other name: Kühnel
- Occupations: Organist; Music publisher

Ambrosius Kühnel (1771 – 19 August 1813) was a German organist and music publisher with a career centered in Leipzig, Saxony.

== Life and career ==
Ambrosius Kühnel was born in Lubiatów, Złotoryja County, Prussia (now Poland) in 1771.

Kühnel held the position of organist at the Electoral Court Chapel in Leipzig from 1795 to 1800, succeeding Carl Immanuel Engel. Establishing himself as a thorough musician and skilled quartet violoncellist, he soon contributed significantly to publishing major works.

Kühnel met the German kapellmeister Franz Anton Hoffmeister at the turn of the 18th century, forming a partnership with him shortly after. Ambrosius Kühnel and Hoffmeister established the music publishing house "Bureau de Musique, Hoffmeister & Kühnel" in Leipzig on 1 December 1800. Combining business acumen and musical expertise, the owners focused on classical music, particularly Bach, Mozart, and Beethoven, while engaging closely with leading composers.

Hoffmeister's return to Vienna in March 1805 to focus on composing left the firm solely in Kühnel’s hands. Beginning in 1805, Kühnel led a company called Neuer Verlag des Bureau de Musique von Kühnel. Among his publications were the Italian singing lessons of Vincenzo Righini and Girolamo Crescentini, the Parisian piano schools of Muzio Clementi, Johann Baptist Cramer, Ignaz Pleyel, and Müller, theoretical works by J. G. Albrechtsberger, Charles-Simon Catel, and Marpurg, and violin schools by Pierre Rode, Rodolphe Kreutzer, and Pierre Baillot, to name a few. Works by Beethoven, Mozart, Haydn, Spohr, Hoffmeister, Cherubini, and Spontini are also included.

Kühnel published a German translation of Italian singer Bernardo Mengozzi's Singing theory of the Conservatorium of Music Paris containing the basic rules of singing exercises for the voice Solfeggien from the older and new works and arias in every kind of movement and character (German: Gesanglehre des Conservatoriums der Musik in Paris. Enthaltend die Grundregeln des Gesanges, Uebungen für die Stimme, Solfeggien aus den besten ältern und neuern Werken und Arien in jeder Art von Bewegung und Charakter).

In 1809, he corresponded with Austrian composer Sigismund von Neukomm about Michael Haydn, the younger brother of the more famous Joseph Haydn.

== Death ==
Ambrosius Kühnel died on 19 August 1813 in Leipzig, Saxony, Germany.

== Legacy ==
Following the music dealer's untimely death, his widow announced that she would continue the business in the same capacity and under the same name for herself and her young sons. Carl Friedrich Peters, a Leipzig bookseller, took over the company in 1814. After purchasing the Bureau de Musique from Kühnel's heirs on 1 April 1814, Peters renamed it Bureau de Musique von C.F. Peters (now Edition Peters). In 1828, it passed into the possession of Carl Gotthelf Siegmund Böhme.
