= Rzymówka =

- Village
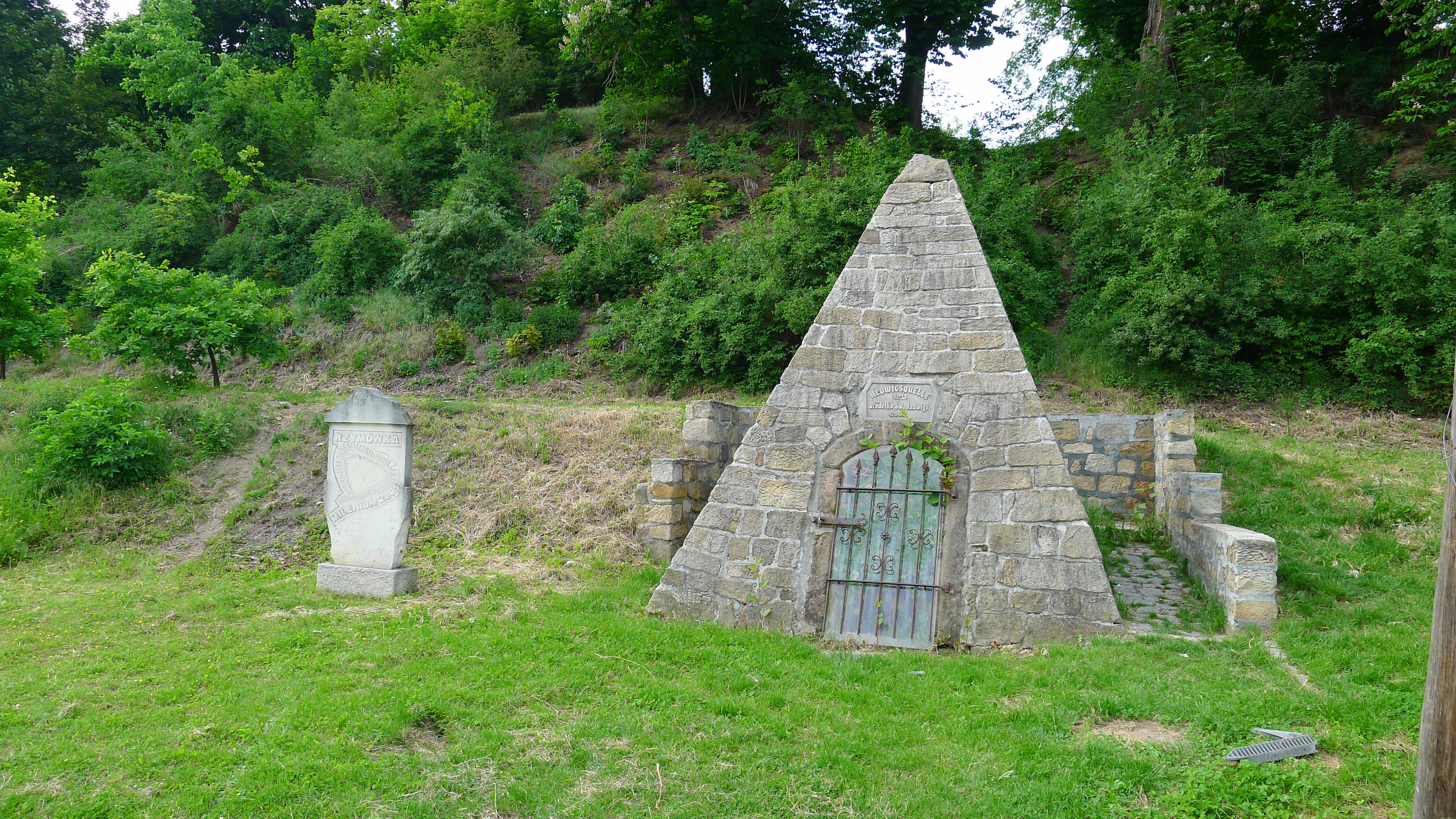
- Cultural heritage monument in Rzymówka - Żródełko

- Location within Poland
- Coordinates: 51°08′27″N 16°01′34″E
- Country: Poland
- Voivodeship: Lower Silesian
- County: Złotoryja
- Gmina: Złotoryja
- Time zone: UTC+1 (CET)
  - Summer (DST): UTC+2 (CEST)
- Vehicle registration: DZL

Rzymówka [ʐɨˈmufka] is a village in the administrative district of Gmina Złotoryja, within Złotoryja County, Lower Silesian Voivodeship, in south-western Poland.
