= Prusice (disambiguation) =

Prusice is a town in Trzebnica County, Lower Silesian Voivodeship (SW Poland).

Prusice may also refer to:

- Prusice, Złotoryja County, a village in Złotoryja County, Lower Silesian Voivodeship
- Gmina Prusice
- Prusice (Prague-East District)
