= Nowa Wieś Złotoryjska =

- Village
- Location within Poland
- Coordinates: 51°09′40″N 15°44′55″E
- Country: Poland
- Voivodeship: Lower Silesian
- County: Złotoryja
- Gmina: Złotoryja

Nowa Wieś Złotoryjska [ˈnɔva ˈvjɛɕ zwɔtɔˈrɨi̯ska] is a village in the administrative district of Gmina Złotoryja, within Złotoryja County, Lower Silesian Voivodeship, in south-western Poland.
