= Rokitnica, Lower Silesian Voivodeship =

Rokitnica
- Village
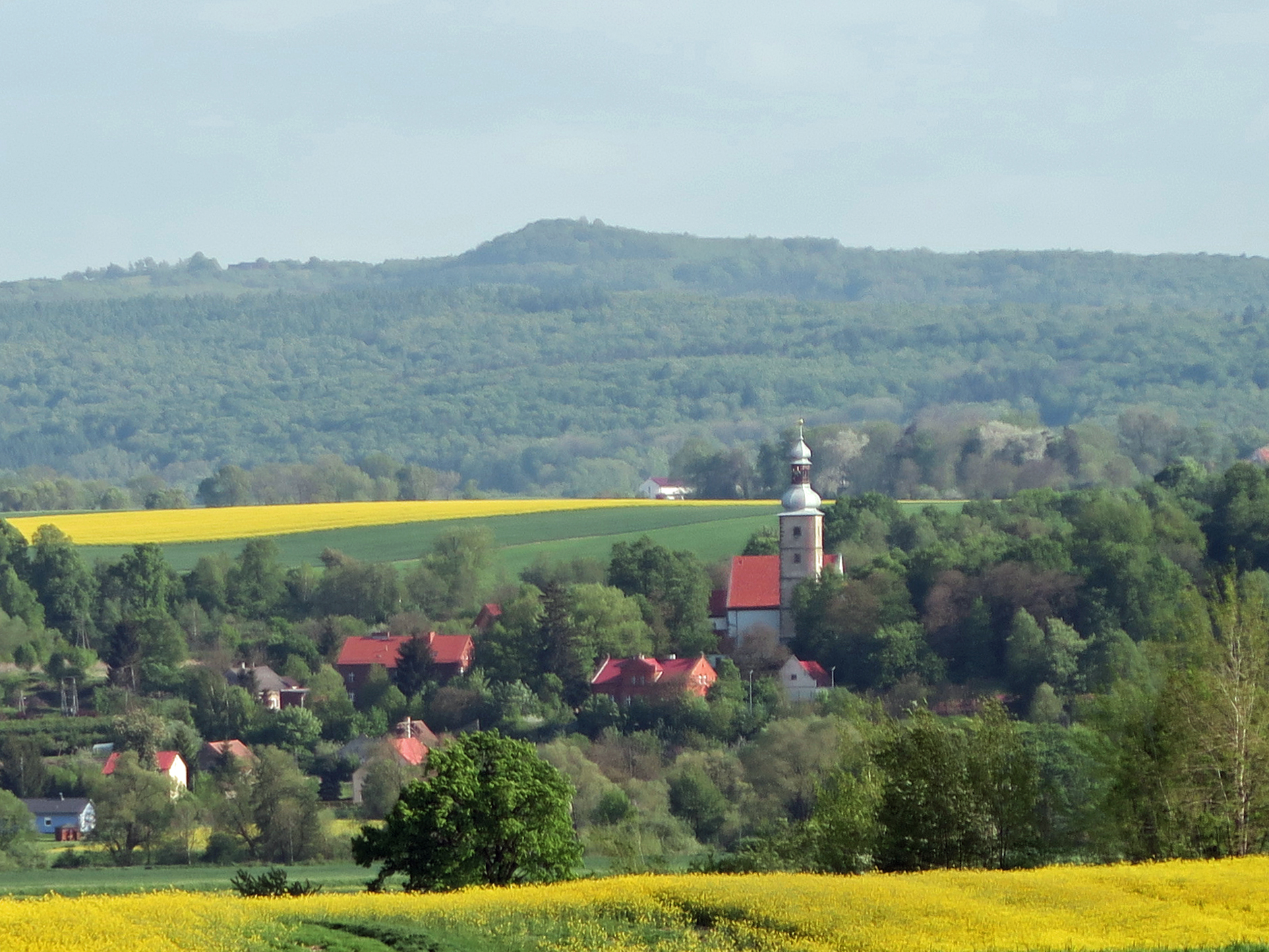

- Location within Poland
- Coordinates: 51°07′40″N 15°58′58″E
- Country: Poland
- Voivodeship: Lower Silesian
- County: Złotoryja
- Gmina: Złotoryja
- Time zone: UTC+1 (CET)
  - Summer (DST): UTC+2 (CEST)
- Postal code: 59-500
- Vehicle registration: DZL

Rokitnica [rɔkitˈnit͡sa] is a village in the administrative district of Gmina Złotoryja, within Złotoryja County, Lower Silesian Voivodeship, in south-western Poland.
