= Sępów =

- Village
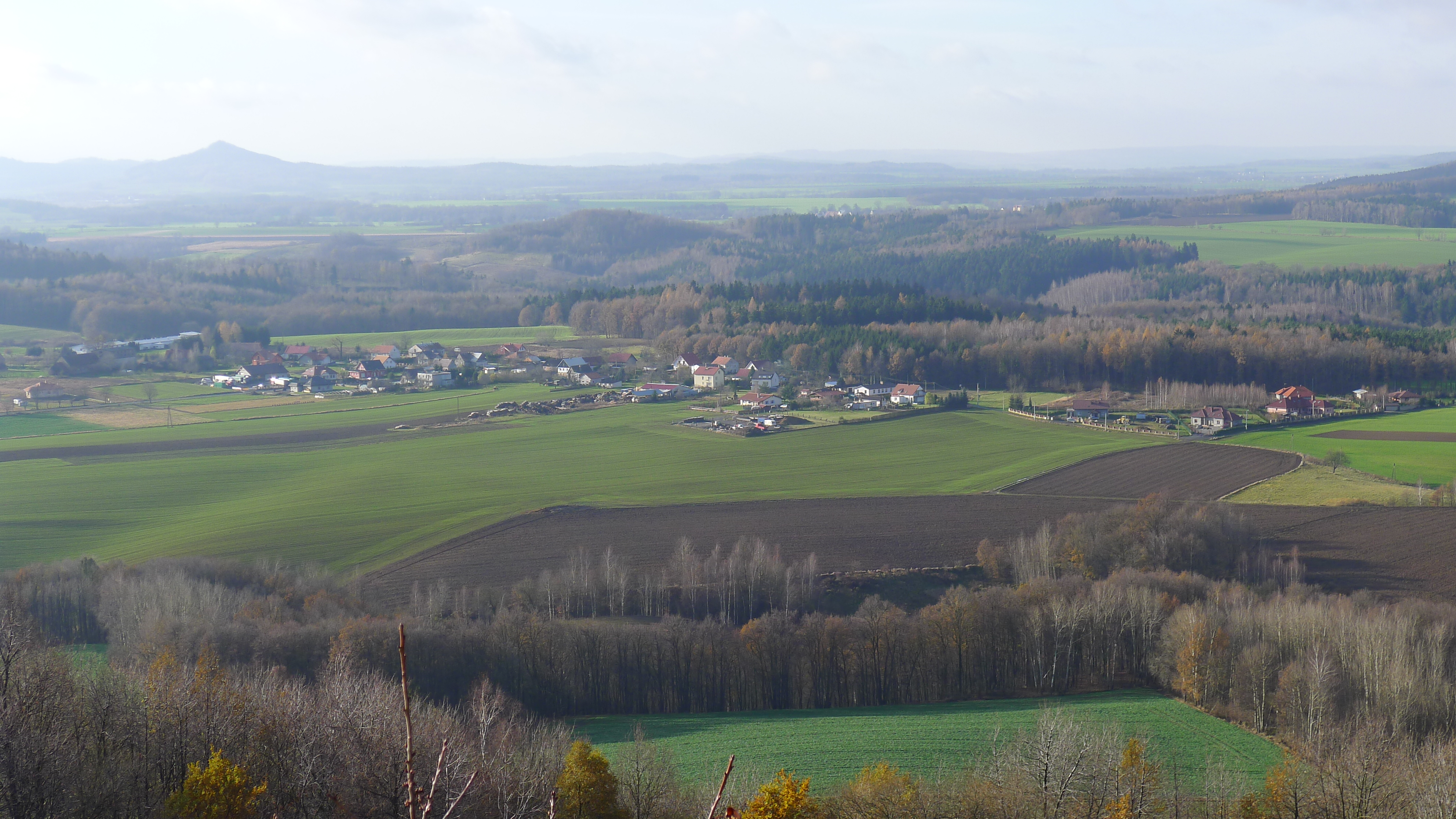
- Sępów - widok z Wilczej Góry

- Location within Poland
- Coordinates: 51°6′N 15°53′E
- Country: Poland
- Voivodeship: Lower Silesian
- County: Złotoryja
- Gmina: Złotoryja

Sępów [ˈsɛmpuf] is a village in the administrative district of Gmina Złotoryja, within Złotoryja County, Lower Silesian Voivodeship, in south-western Poland.
