= Nowy Kościół =

- Village
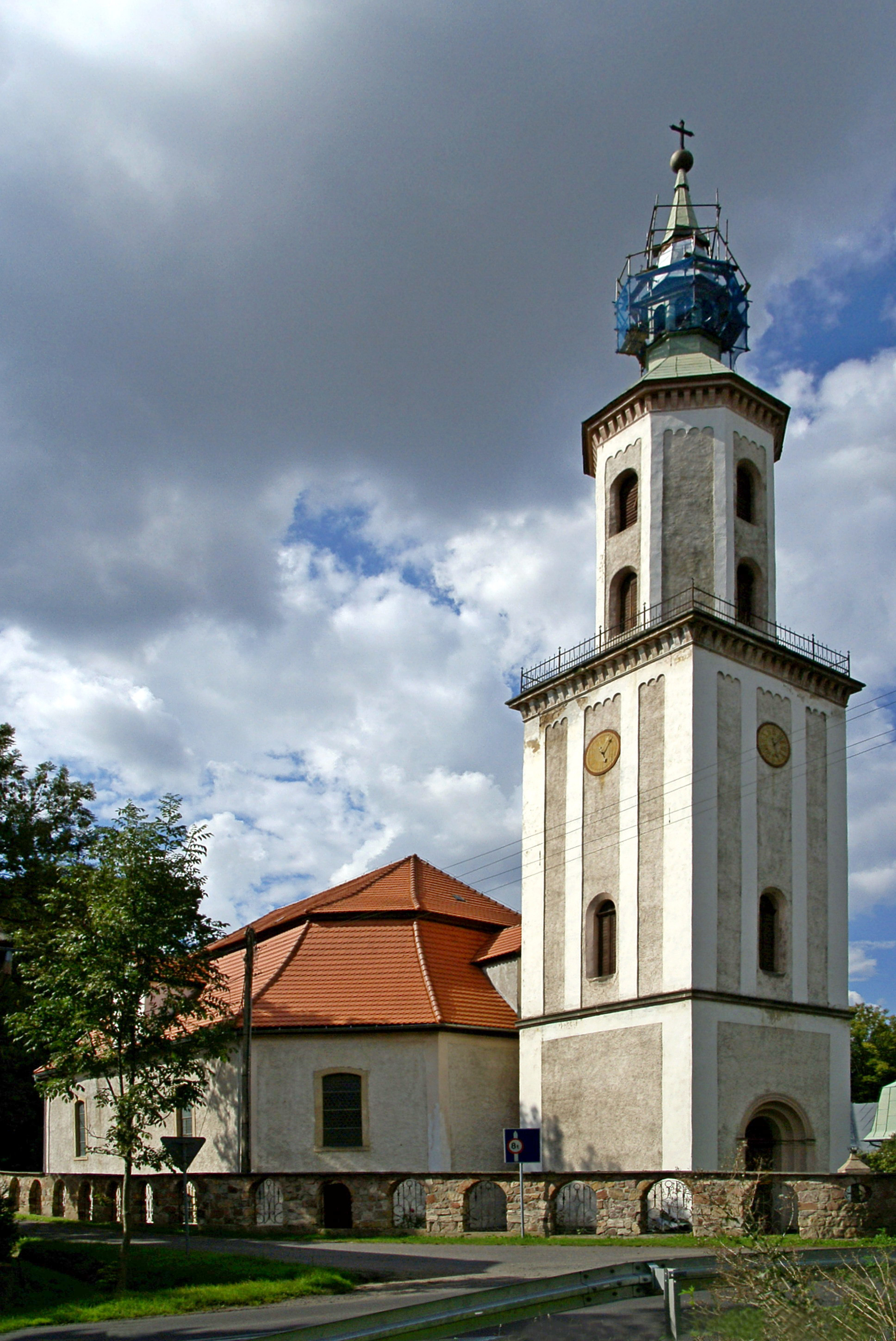
- Our Lady of Rosary Church

- Location within Poland
- Coordinates: 51°4′N 15°52′E
- Country: Poland
- Voivodeship: Lower Silesian
- County: Złotoryja
- Gmina: Świerzawa

Nowy Kościół ([ˈnɔvɨ ˈkɔɕt͡ɕuu̯]) (German: Neukirch) is a village in the administrative district of Gmina Świerzawa, within Złotoryja County, Lower Silesian Voivodeship, in south-western Poland.
