= Kopacz, Lower Silesian Voivodeship =

Kopacz
- Village
- Location within Poland
- Coordinates: 51°08′N 15°56′E
- Country: Poland
- Voivodeship: Lower Silesian
- County: Złotoryja
- Gmina: Złotoryja
- Population: 230

Kopacz [ˈkɔpat͡ʂ] is a village in the administrative district of Gmina Złotoryja, within Złotoryja County, Lower Silesian Voivodeship, in south-western Poland.
