= Prusice, Złotoryja County =

Prusice
- Village
- Location within Poland
- Coordinates: 51°6′N 15°59′E
- Country: Poland
- Voivodeship: Lower Silesian
- County: Złotoryja
- Gmina: Złotoryja
- Time zone: UTC+1 (CET)
  - Summer (DST): UTC+2 (CEST)
- Vehicle registration: DZL

Prusice [pruˈɕit͡sɛ] is a village in the administrative district of Gmina Złotoryja, within Złotoryja County, Lower Silesian Voivodeship, in south-western Poland.

== History ==
In the final stages of World War II, on 1 February 1945, a German-organized death march of Allied prisoners of war from the Stalag Luft 7 POW camp stopped in the village, and the Germans locked the POWs in a barn for the night.
