= Łaźniki, Lower Silesian Voivodeship =

Łaźniki
- Village
- Location within Poland
- Coordinates: 51°07′11″N 16°01′53″E
- Country: Poland
- Voivodeship: Lower Silesian
- County: Złotoryja
- Gmina: Złotoryja

Łaźniki [waʑˈniki] is a village in the administrative district of Gmina Złotoryja, within Złotoryja County, Lower Silesian Voivodeship, in south-western Poland.
