= Wilków, Złotoryja County =

Wilków
- Village
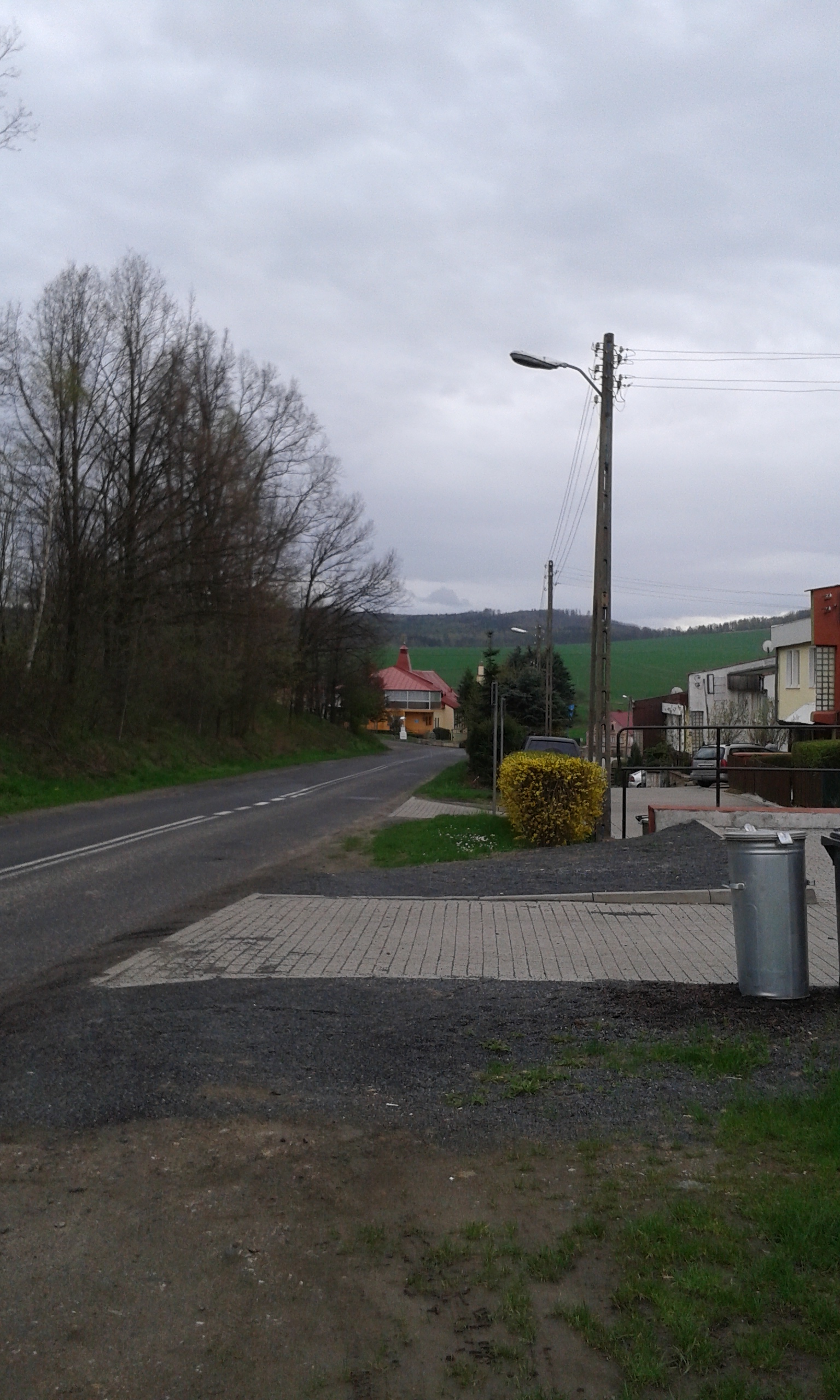
- Wilków droga

- Location within Poland
- Coordinates: 51°5′N 15°56′E
- Country: Poland
- Voivodeship: Lower Silesian
- County: Złotoryja
- Gmina: Złotoryja
- Population: 2,000
- Website: http://www.wilkow.xt.pl/

Wilków [ˈvilkuf] is a village in the administrative district of Gmina Złotoryja, within Złotoryja County, Lower Silesian Voivodeship, in south-western Poland.
