= Wyskok, Lower Silesian Voivodeship =

Wyskok
- Village
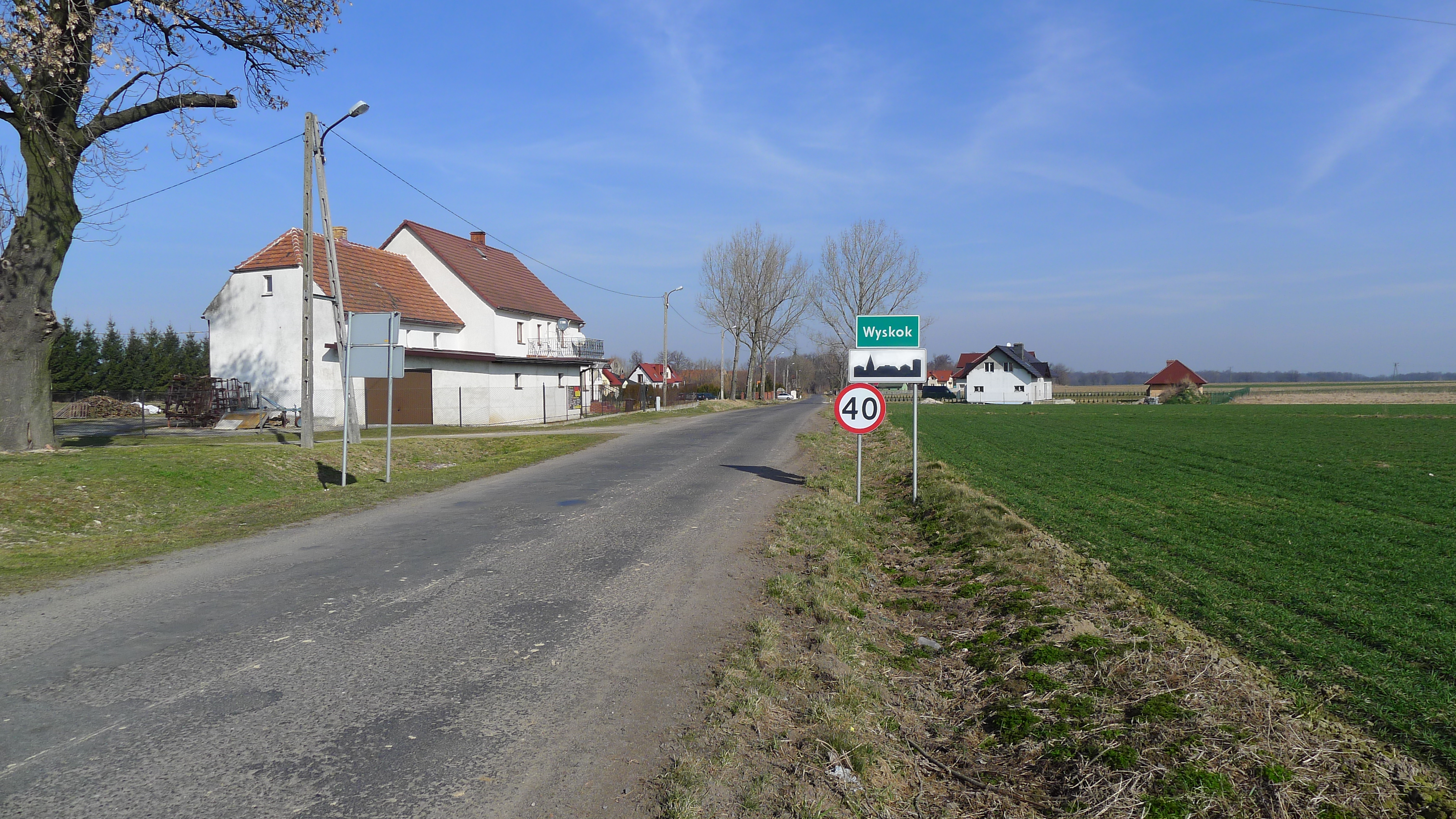

- Location within Poland
- Coordinates: 51°09′31″N 15°56′18″E
- Country: Poland
- Voivodeship: Lower Silesian
- County: Złotoryja
- Gmina: Złotoryja

Wyskok [ˈvɨskɔk] is a village in the administrative district of Gmina Złotoryja, within Złotoryja County, Lower Silesian Voivodeship, in south-western Poland.
