= Wysocko, Lower Silesian Voivodeship =

Wysocko
- Village
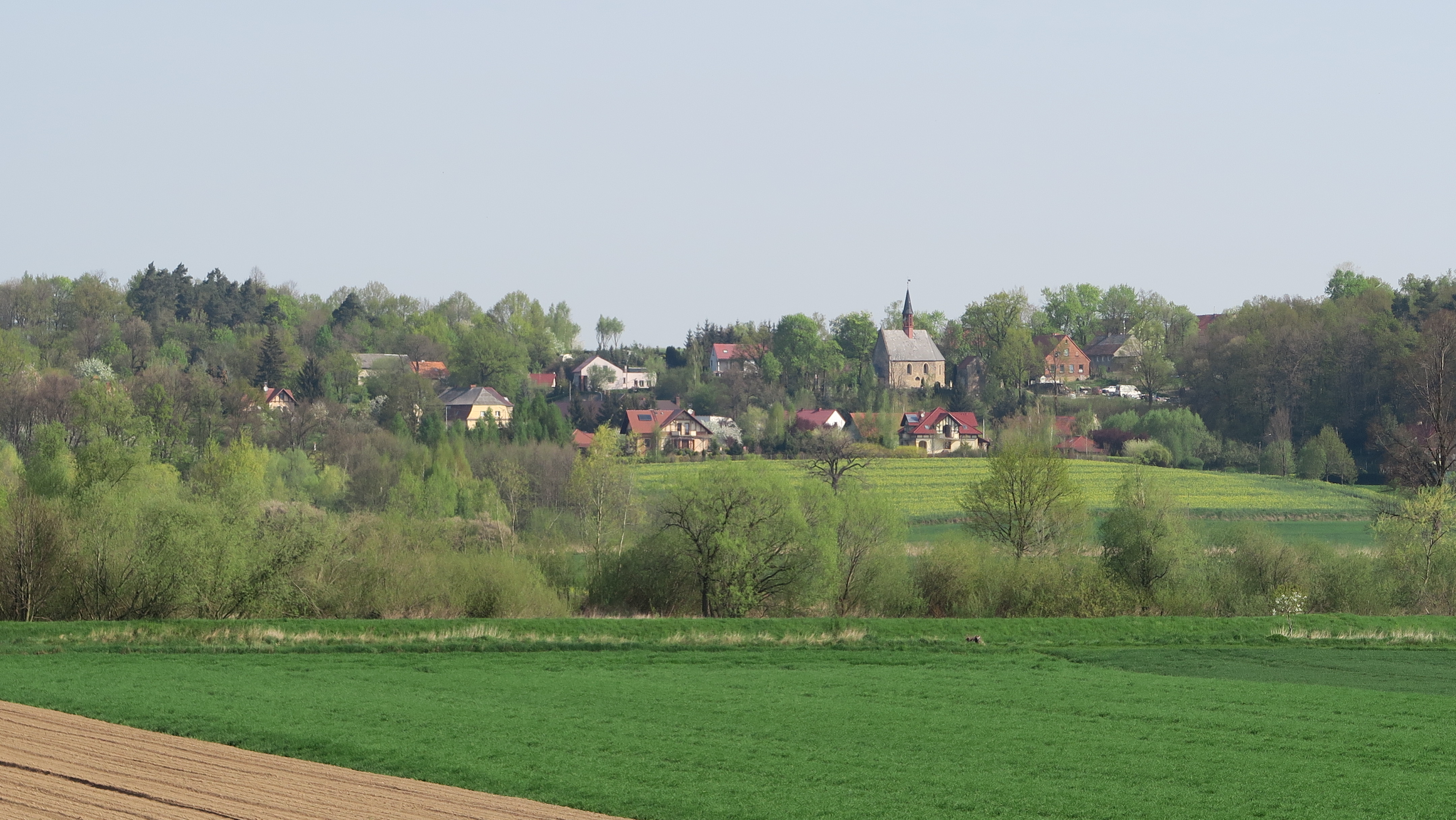

- Location within Poland
- Coordinates: 51°8′N 16°0′E
- Country: Poland
- Voivodeship: Lower Silesian
- County: Złotoryja
- Gmina: Złotoryja

Wysocko [vɨˈsɔt͡skɔ] is a village in the administrative district of Gmina Złotoryja, within Złotoryja County, Lower Silesian Voivodeship, in south-western Poland.
