= Brennik, Złotoryja County =

Brennik
- Village
- Location within Poland
- Coordinates: 51°10′14″N 15°58′53″E
- Country: Poland
- Voivodeship: Lower Silesian
- County: Złotoryja
- Gmina: Złotoryja
- Time zone: UTC+1 (CET)
  - Summer (DST): UTC+2 (CEST)
- Vehicle registration: DZL

Brennik [ˈbrɛnnik] is a village in the administrative district of Gmina Złotoryja, within Złotoryja County, Lower Silesian Voivodeship, in southwestern Poland. Its population in 2011 was 271.

== History ==
Brennik was mentioned in the Liber fundationis episcopatus Vratislaviensis from c. 1305, when it was part of Piast-ruled Poland. Later, it formed part of Bohemia, Prussia and Germany, before it became again part of Poland after Germany's defeat in World War II.
