= Valentin Friedland =

German scholar and educationist

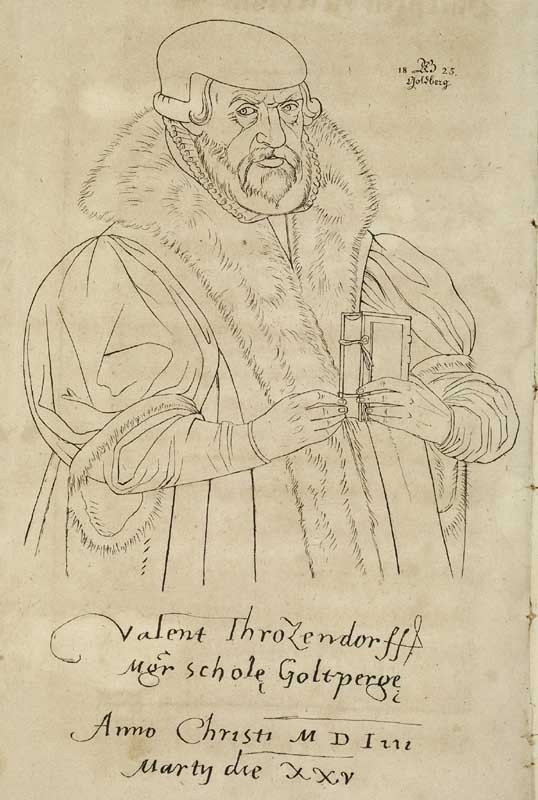
Valentin Trozendorf by Gustav Pinzger 1825

Valentin Friedland (14 February 1490 – 26 April 1556), also called Valentin Troitschendorf (or Trozendorf or Trotzendorf or Trocedorfius) after his birthplace, was a German scholar and educationist of the Reformation. Friedland was a friend of Martin Luther and Melanchthon. His fame as a teacher was an attraction of Goldberg in Silesia, where he taught pupils from far and near. The secret of his success lay in his inculcating on his pupils respect for their own honour. He had a great faith in the intelligence that evinced itself in clear expression.

== Biography ==
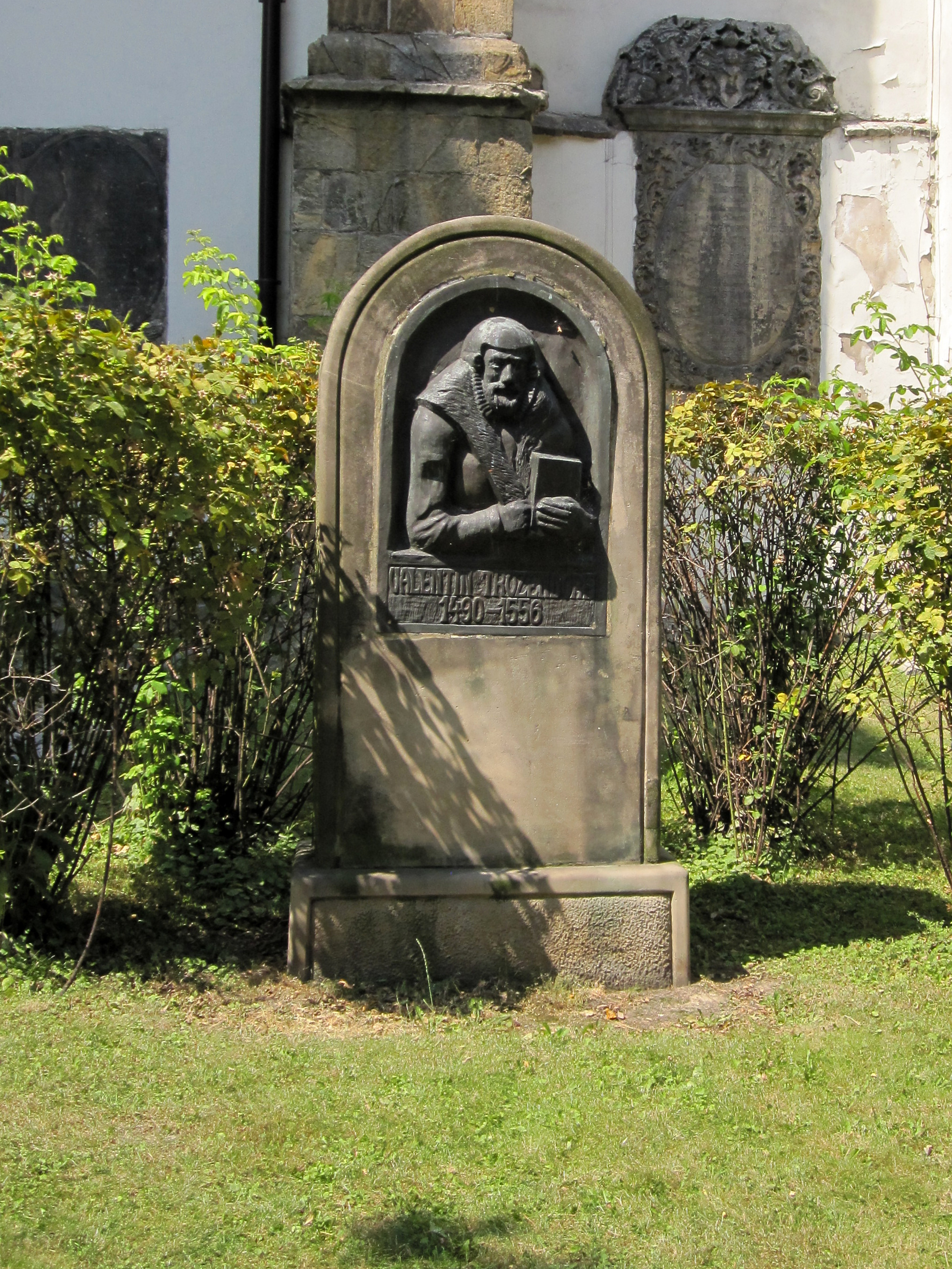
Valentin Trozendorf monument in Złotoryja

Friedland was born in Trozendorf near the town of Görlitz in Upper Lusatia, of parents so poor that they could not keep him at school. The boy taught himself to read and write while herding cattle; he made paper from birch bark and ink from soot. When difficulties were overcome and he was sent for education to Görlitz, his mother's last words were "Stick to the school, dear son". The words determined his career: he refused all ecclesiastical promotion, and lived and died a schoolmaster.

Friedland became a distinguished student at the University of Leipzig, learned Ciceronian Latin from Peter Mosellanus and Greek from Richard Croke, and after graduation was appointed assistant master in the school at Görlitz in 1515. There he also taught the rector and other teachers. When Martin Luther began his attack on indulgences, Trotzendorff resigned his position and went to study under Luther and Melanchthon at Wittenberg, supporting himself by private tuition. Thence he was called to be a master in the school at Goldberg, and in 1524 became rector. There he remained three years, when he was sent to Liegnitz.

Friedland returned to Goldberg in 1531 and began that career which has made him the typical German schoolmaster of the Reformation period. His system of education and discipline speedily attracted attention. He made his best elder scholars the teachers of the younger classes, and insisted that the way to learn was to teach. He organized the school modelled on the Roman Republic in such a way that the whole ordinary discipline was in the hands of the boys themselves. Every month a consul, twelve senators and two censors were chosen from the pupils, and over all Trotzendorff ruled as dictator perpetuus. One hour a day was spent in going over the lessons of the previous day. The lessons were repeatedly recalled by examinations, which were conducted on the plan of academical disputations. Every week each pupil had to write two exercitia styli, one in prose and the other in verse, and Trotzendorff took pains to see that the subject of each exercise was something interesting. The fame of the Goldberg School extended over all Protestant Germany, and a large number of the more famous men of the following generation were taught by Trotzendorf.

After Friedland's school, his library, his assets, and the greater part of Goldberg were destroyed by a fire in 1554, he moved again to Liegnitz at the invitation of the duke there. His school, now with a significantly reduced number of pupils, found a place in a church. He gathered the means for rebuilding the school in Goldberg, but died before this was accomplished, in 1556.
