= Lubiatów, Złotoryja County =

Lubiatów
- Village
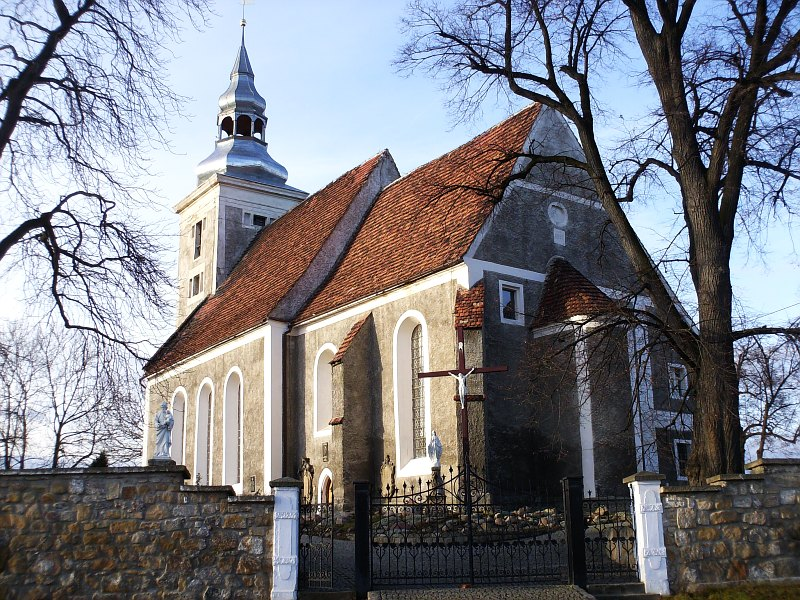
- Church of the Sacred Heart

- Location within Poland
- Coordinates: 51°12′18″N 16°01′48″E
- Country: Poland
- Voivodeship: Lower Silesian
- County: Złotoryja
- Gmina: Złotoryja

Population
  - Total: 730

Lubiatów [luˈbjatuf] is a village in the administrative district of Gmina Złotoryja, within Złotoryja County, Lower Silesian Voivodeship, in south-western Poland.
