= Kopacz (surname) =

Kopacz is a Polish surname and means "digger". Notable people with the surname include:

- Alexander Kopacz (born 1990), Canadian bobsledder
- Bartosz Kopacz (born 1992), Polish footballer
- David Kopacz (born 1999), Polish footballer
- Ewa Kopacz (born 1956), Polish politician, former Prime Minister of Poland
- George Kopacz (born 1941), American baseball player
- Joseph Kopacz (born 1950), American Catholic bishop
- Tibor Kopacz (1962–2009), Romanian speed skater
