= Gmina Złotoryja =

Gmina Złotoryja Złotoryja Commune
- Gmina
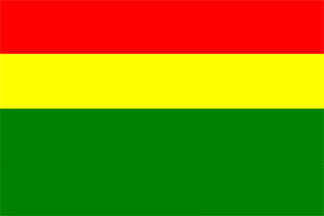
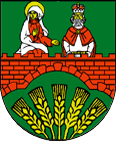
- Flag Coat of arms
- Interactive map of Gmina Złotoryja
- Coordinates (Złotoryja): 51°08′N 15°55′E
- Country: Poland
- Voivodeship: Lower Silesian
- County: Złotoryja
- Seat: Złotoryja
- Sołectwos: Brennik, Ernestynów, Gierałtowiec, Jerzmanice-Zdrój, Kopacz, Kozów, Łaźniki, Leszczyna, Lubiatów, Nowa Wieś Złotoryjska, Podolany, Prusice, Pyskowice, Rokitnica, Rzymówka, Sępów, Wilków, Wyskok, Wysocko

Area
  - Total: 145.07 km^{2} (56.01 sq mi)

Population (2019-06-30)
  - Total: 7,071
  - Density: 48.74/km^{2} (126.2/sq mi)
- Website: http://www.zlotoryja.com.pl

Gmina Złotoryja is a rural gmina (administrative district) in Złotoryja County, Lower Silesian Voivodeship, in south-western Poland. Its seat is the town of Złotoryja, although the town is not part of the territory of the gmina.

The gmina covers an area of 145.07 square kilometres (56.0 sq mi), and as of 2019 its total population is 7,071.

== Neighbouring gminas ==
Gmina Złotoryja is bordered by the town of Złotoryja and by the gminas of Chojnów, Krotoszyce, Męcinka, Miłkowice, Pielgrzymka, Świerzawa and Zagrodno.

== Villages ==
The gmina contains the villages of Brennik, Ernestynów, Gierałtowiec, Jerzmanice-Zdrój, Kopacz, Kozów, Łaźniki, Leszczyna, Lubiatów, Nowa Wieś Złotoryjska, Podolany, Prusice, Pyskowice, Rokitnica, Rzymówka, Sępów, Wilków, Wyskok and Wysocko.
