= Świerzawa =

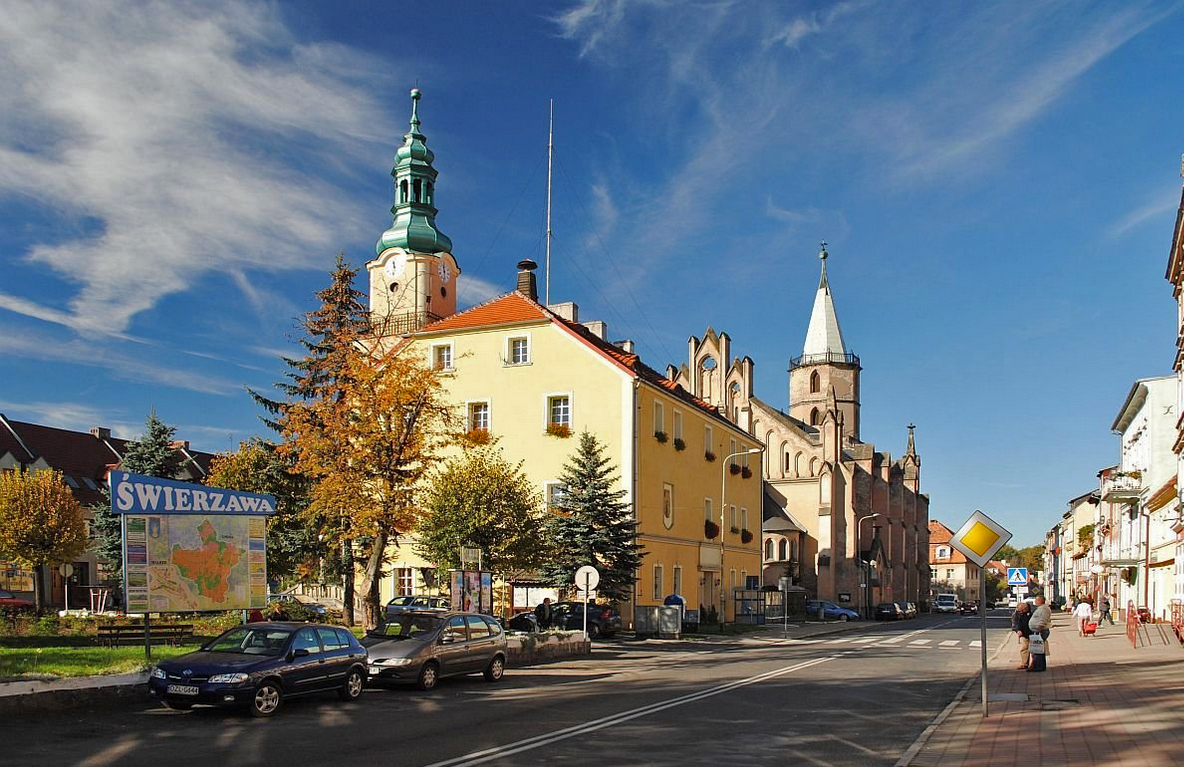
- Town center with the town hall in the foreground and Saint Joseph church in the background

- Coat of arms

- Location within Poland
- Coordinates: 51°1′N 15°54′E
- Country: Poland
- Voivodeship: Lower Silesian
- County: Złotoryja
- Gmina: Świerzawa
- Town rights: 1296

Government
  - Mayor: Paweł Kisowski

Area
  - Total: 1.76 km^{2} (0.68 sq mi)

Population (2019-06-30)
  - Total: 2,286
  - Density: 1,300/km^{2} (3,360/sq mi)
- Time zone: UTC+1 (CET)
  - Summer (DST): UTC+2 (CEST)
- Postal code: 59-540
- Vehicle registration: DZL
- Website: http://www.swierzawa.pl

Świerzawa (Polish: [ɕfjɛˈʐava]; formerly Polish: Szunów, German: Schönau) is a town in Złotoryja County, Lower Silesian Voivodeship, in south-western Poland. It is the seat of the administrative district (gmina) called Gmina Świerzawa.

As of 2019, the town has a population of 2,286.

== History ==
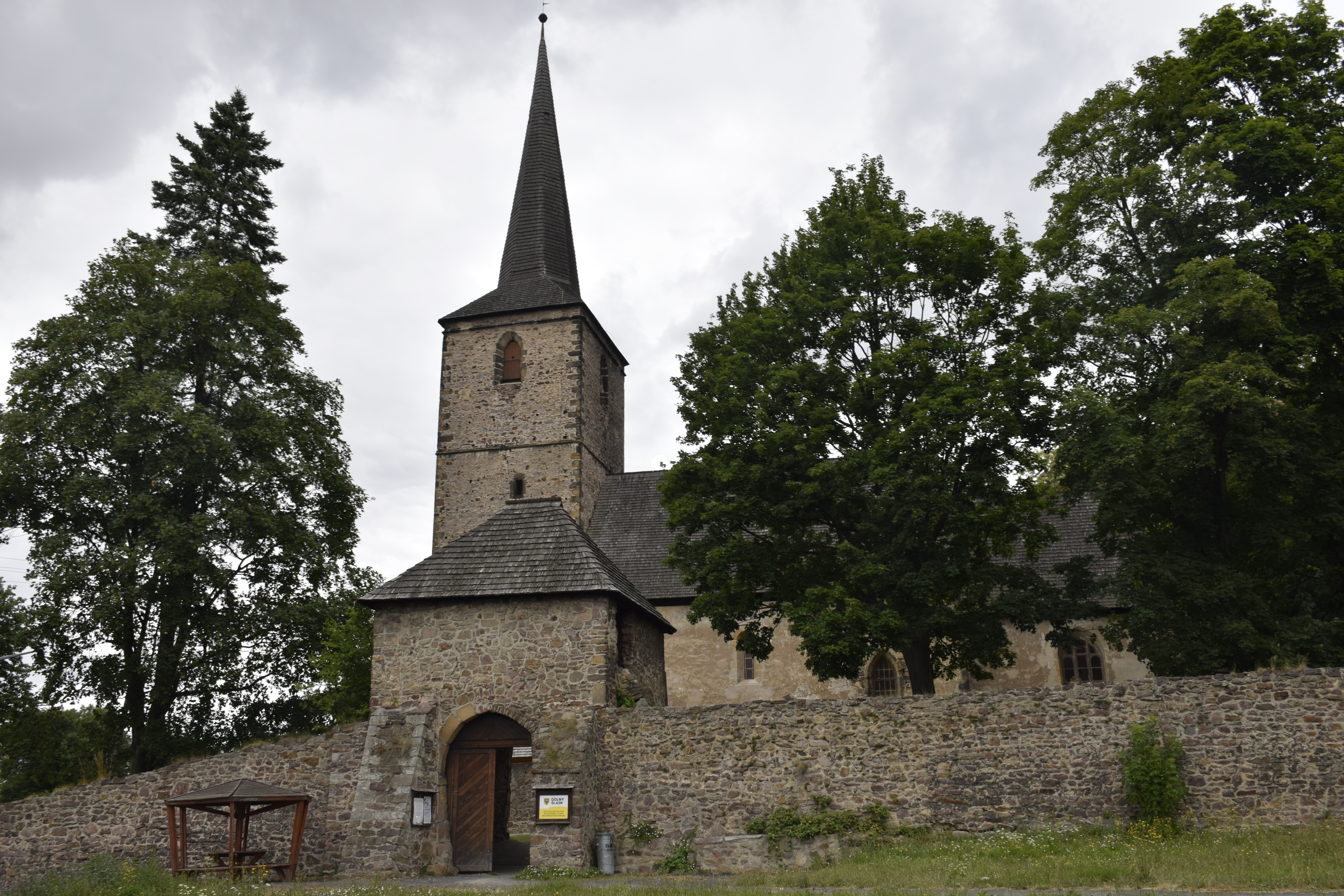
Romanesque Saints John the Baptist and Catherine church, the oldest church in Świerzawa

It was initially a Polish stronghold, possibly besieged during the first Mongol invasion of Poland in 1241. It was granted town rights by Duke Bolko I the Strict in 1296, when it was part of the Duchy of Jawor within fragmented Piast-ruled Poland. In 1426, the town was captured and devastated by the Hussites. The town was affected by fires in 1487 and 1639. The local church was taken by Protestants during the Reformation and then restored to the Catholics in 1637. During the Thirty Years' War, in 1640, it was the site of a Swedish victory against the Austrians.

== Demographics ==
Historical population

Year	Pop.	±%
1880	1,518	—
1890	1,497	−1.4%
1900	1,707	+14.0%
1910	1,753	+2.7%
1925	1,810	+3.3%

Year	Pop.	±%
1939	1,911	+5.6%
1950	1,048	−45.2%
1960	2,139	+104.1%
2010	2,364	+10.5%

== Twin towns – sister cities ==
See twin towns of Gmina Świerzawa.
