= Złotoryja County =

Coordinates: 51°08′N 15°55′E

Złotoryja County Powiat złotoryjski
- County
- Flag Coat of arms

- Location within the voivodeship
- Country: Poland
- Voivodeship: Lower Silesian
- Seat: Złotoryja
- Gminas: Total 6 (incl. 2 urban): Wojcieszów; Złotoryja; Gmina Pielgrzymka; Gmina Świerzawa; Gmina Zagrodno; Gmina Złotoryja

Area
  - Total: 575.45 km^{2} (222.18 sq mi)

Population (2019-06-30)
  - Total: 43,719
  - Density: 75.974/km^{2} (196.77/sq mi)
  - Urban: 21,518
  - Rural: 22,201
- Car plates: DZL
- Website: www.powiat-zlotoryja.pl

Złotoryja County (Polish: powiat złotoryjski) is a unit of territorial administration and local government (powiat) in Lower Silesian Voivodeship, south-western Poland. It came into being on January 1, 1999, as a result of the Polish local government reforms passed in 1998. The county covers an area of 575.45 square kilometres (222.2 sq mi). Its administrative seat is Złotoryja, and it also contains the towns of Wojcieszów and Świerzawa.

As of 2019 the total population of the county is 43,719, out of which the population of Złotoryja is 15,564, that of Wojcieszów is 3,668, that of Świerzawa is 2,286, and the rural population is 22,201.

== Neighbouring counties ==
Złotoryja County is bordered by Legnica County to the north-east, Jawor County to the east, Karkonosze County to the south, and Lwówek County and Bolesławiec County to the west.

== Administrative divisions ==
The county is subdivided into six gminas (two urban, one urban-rural and three rural). These are listed in the following table, in descending order of population.

Gmina	Type	Area (km^{2})	Population (2019)	Seat
Złotoryja	urban	11.5	15,564	
Gmina Świerzawa	urban-rural	157.7	7,552	Świerzawa
Gmina Złotoryja	rural	145.1	7,071	Złotoryja*
Gmina Zagrodno	rural	122.1	5,294	Zagrodno
Gmina Pielgrzymka	rural	105.2	4,570	Pielgrzymka
Wojcieszów	urban	32.2	3,668	
* seat not part of the gmina
