= Ernest Carter =

Ernest Carter may refer to:

- Ernest Carter (drummer), American drummer
- Ernest Carter (footballer) (1889–1955), Australian rules footballer
- Ernest Trow Carter (1866–1953), organist and composer
- Ernest Vernon Carter (1925–2010), American politician
- Ernest Courtenay Carter, Anglican minister who perished in the sinking of the RMS Titanic
- Spoon Carter (Ernest C. Carter Jr., 1902–1974), American baseball player
- Ernest Carter (runner) (born 1902), American middle-distance runner, 3rd in the mile at the 1927 USA Outdoor Track and Field Championships
- Vernon Ernest Carter (1919–2007), American civil rights activist
