= Vernon Carter =

Vernon Carter may refer to:

- Vernon Christopher Carter, baseball infielder
- Vernon E. Carter, civil rights activist (1919–2007)
- Ernest Vernon Carter, American politician (1925–2010)
