= Konradswaldau =

Konradswaldau may refer to:

- Kondratów, Świdnica County, Lower Silesian Voivodeship, Poland
- Mrowiny, Jawor County, Lower Silesian Voivodeship, Poland
