= Małuszów =

Małuszów may refer to the following places in Poland:

- Małuszów, Jawor County in Lower Silesian Voivodeship (south-west Poland)
- Małuszów, Wrocław County in Lower Silesian Voivodeship (south-west Poland)
- Małuszów, Lubusz Voivodeship (west Poland)
