= Hans-Ulrich Rudel =

German military officer (1916-1982)

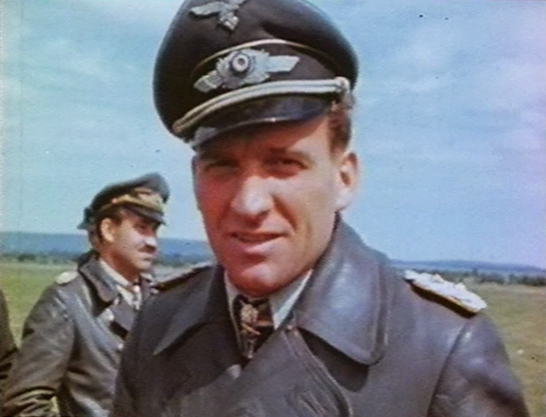
- Hans-Ulrich Rudel in 1945 (Adolf Galland in the background)
- Born: 2 July 1916; Konradswaldau, German Empire
- Died: 18 December 1982 (aged 66); Rosenheim, West Germany
- Burial place: Dornhausen
- Military career
- Allegiance: Nazi Germany
- Branch: Luftwaffe
- Service years: 1936–1945
- Rank: Oberst (colonel)
- Service number: Allgemeine SS #206,953
- Units: StG 3, StG 2, SG 2
- Commands: SG 2
- Known for: Claiming to have destroyed over 500 tanks
- Conflicts: World War II
- Awards: Knight's Cross of the Iron Cross with Golden Oak Leaves, Swords, and Diamonds
- Other work: Founder of relief organization for Nazi war criminals Neo-Nazi activist Election candidate from the extremist German Reich Party

Hans-Ulrich Rudel (2 July 1916 – 18 December 1982) was a German ground-attack pilot during World War II and a post-war neo-Nazi activist.

The most decorated German pilot of the war and the only recipient of the Knight's Cross with Golden Oak Leaves, Swords, and Diamonds, Rudel knocked out 519 tanks, one battleship, one cruiser, 70 landing craft and 150 artillery emplacements. He claimed nine aerial victories and the destruction of more than 800 vehicles. He flew 2,530 ground-attack missions exclusively on the Eastern Front, usually flying the Junkers Ju 87 "Stuka" dive bomber.

Rudel surrendered to US forces in 1945 and emigrated to Argentina. An unrepentant Nazi, he helped fugitives escape to Latin America and the Middle East, and sheltered Josef Mengele, the former SS doctor of Auschwitz. He worked as an arms dealer to several right-wing regimes in South America, for which he was placed under observation by the US Central Intelligence Agency.

In the West German federal election of 1953, Rudel was the top candidate for the far-right German Reich Party but was not elected. After the 1955 Argentinian military coup d'etat that deposed constitutional president Juan Perón, Rudel moved to Paraguay, where he acted as a foreign representative for several German companies.

== Early life ==
Rudel was born on 2 July 1916, in Konradswaldau, in Lower Silesia, Prussia. He was the third child of Lutheran minister Johannes Rudel. As a boy, Rudel was a keen sportsman and attended the humanities-oriented Gymnasium in Lauban. He joined the Hitler Youth in 1933. After graduating with Abitur in 1936, he participated in the compulsory Reich Labour Service (RAD). Following the labour service, Rudel joined the Luftwaffe in the same year and began his military career as an air reconnaissance pilot. Rudel was not a member of the Nazi Party. However, he did join the Allgemeine SS with membership number 206,953.

== World War II ==
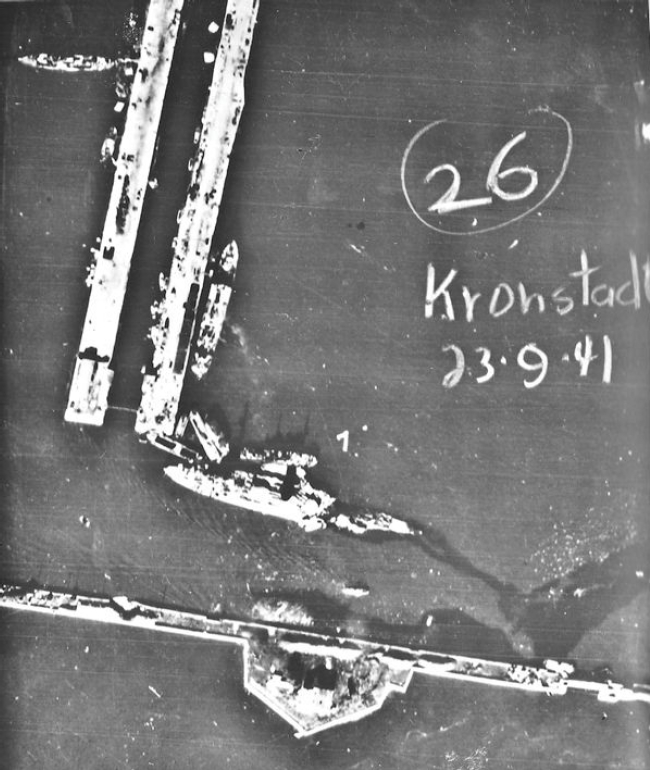
Aerial photograph of the sunken Marat

German forces invaded Poland in 1939 starting World War II in Europe. As an air observer, Rudel flew on long-range reconnaissance missions over Poland. During 1940, he served as a regimental adjutant for the 43rd Aviators Training Regiment, based at Vienna.

In early 1941, he underwent training as a Stuka pilot. He was posted to 1 Staffel Sturzkampfgeschwader 2 (StG 2), which was moved to occupied Poland in preparation for Operation Barbarossa, the invasion of the Soviet Union, in June 1941.

On 21 September 1941, Rudel took part in an attack on the Soviet battleship Marat of the Baltic Fleet. Marat sank at her moorings on 23 September 1941 after being hit by two bombs, one a 1,000-kilogram (2,200 lb) bomb near the forward superstructure. It caused the explosion of the forward magazine which demolished the superstructure and the forward part of the hull. 326 men were killed. The ship gradually settled to the bottom in 11 meters (36 ft) of water. Her sinking is commonly credited to Rudel alone, but Rudel dropped only one of the bombs that sank her. Rudel's unit then took part in Operation Typhoon, Army Group Center's attempt to capture Moscow, the Soviet capital.

Rudel's gunner from October 1941 was Erwin Hentschel, who served with Rudel for the next two and a half years, both men earning the Knight's Cross of the Iron Cross during that period. Hentschel completed 1,400 sorties with Rudel.

In early 1942, Rudel got married while home on leave. Later in the year, he took part in the Battle of Stalingrad. From May 1941 to January 1942, Rudel flew 500 missions. In February 1943, Rudel flew his 1,000th combat mission, which made him into a national hero.

He then participated in experiments using the Ju 87 G in the anti-tank role. He took part in anti-tank operations against the Soviet Kerch–Eltigen Operation. Footage from an onboard gun camera was used in Die Deutsche Wochenschau, a Reich Ministry of Propaganda newsreel. In April 1943, Rudel was awarded the Knight's Cross of the Iron Cross with Oak Leaves, receiving the Oak Leaves from Hitler personally in Berlin.

Rudel and the same anti-tank unit participated in the Battle of Kursk. On the first day of the German offensive, 5 July, he flew a Ju-87G, the first time one had seen action. It was a stuka equipped as an anti-tank aircraft by having two 37 mm (1.46 in) Bordkanone BK 3,7 cannons mounted in under-wing gun pods. The concept was Rudel's idea and proved very successful. On 12 July 1943 he claimed 12 Soviet tanks in one day. Ferdinand Schörner, a senior German general, commented "Rudel alone replaces a whole division". The fighting was intense and Rudel was fortunate to survive, as the slow moving stukas were vulnerable and suffered a high casualty rate. In October 1943, Rudel was credited with the destruction of his 100th tank and was awarded the Knight's Cross of the Iron Cross with Oak Leaves and Swords (one of only 160 awarded) on 25 November.

Rudel was appointed Gruppenkommandeur of III. Gruppe on 22 February 1944. On 20 March, Rudel performed a forced landing behind Soviet lines and he and Erwin Hentschel, his longtime gunner, made their way to the German lines. The men attempted to swim across the Dniester River but Hentschel drowned in the attempt. Upon his return, Ernst Gadermann, previously the troop doctor of III. Gruppe, joined Rudel as his new radio operator and air gunner. Rudel was awarded the Knight's Cross of the Iron Cross with Oak Leaves, Swords and Diamonds (one of only 27 awarded) on 29 March 1944, the tenth member of the Wehrmacht to receive this award. The presentation was made by Hitler personally.

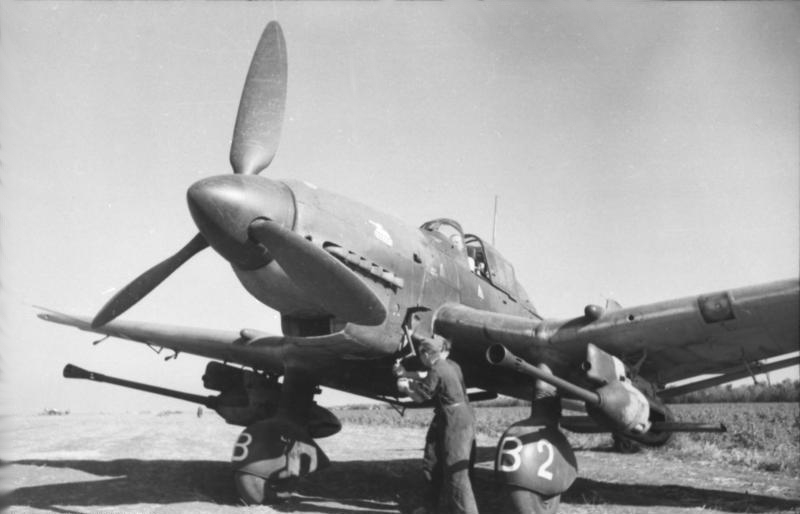
Ju 87 equipped with the anti-tank cannon

Rudel was promoted to Oberstleutnant on 1 September 1944, and appointed leader of SG 2, replacing Stepp, on 1 October 1944. On 22 December 1944, Rudel completed his 2,400th combat mission, and the next day, he reported his 463rd tank destroyed. On 29 December 1944, Rudel was promoted to Oberst (colonel), and was awarded the Knight's Cross of the Iron Cross with Golden Oak Leaves, Swords, and Diamonds, the only person to receive this decoration. This award, intended as one of 12 to be given as a post-war victory award for Nazi Germany, was presented to him by Hitler on 1 January 1945, four months before Nazi Germany was defeated.

On 8 February 1945, Rudel was badly wounded in the right foot, and landed inside German lines as his radio operator shouted flight instructions. Rudel's leg was amputated below the knee. He returned to flying on 25 March 1945. He claimed 26 more tanks destroyed by the end of the war. Over the course of the war he claims to have destroyed 519 Soviet tanks, flying 2,530 missions. There is no primary source confirming his claims. On 19 April 1945, the day before Hitler's final birthday, Rudel met with Hitler in the Führerbunker at the Reich Chancellery in Berlin. On 8 May 1945, Rudel fled westward from an airfield near Prague, landing in US controlled territory, and turned himself in. The Americans refused to hand him over to the Soviet Union.

== Continued National Socialist activities ==
While Rudel was interned, his family fled from the advancing Red Army and found refuge with Gadermann's parents in Wuppertal. Rudel was released in April 1946 and went into private business. In 1948, he emigrated to Argentina via the ratlines, travelling via the Austrian Zillertal to Italy. In Rome, with the help of South Tyrolean smugglers, and aided by the Austrian bishop Alois Hudal, he bought himself a fake Red Cross passport with the cover name "Emilio Meier", and took a flight from Rome to Buenos Aires, where he arrived on 8 June 1948. Rudel authored books on the war, supporting the regime and attacking the Oberkommando der Wehrmacht for "failing Hitler".

=== In South America ===
After Rudel moved to Argentina, he became a close friend and confidant of the President of Argentina Juan Perón, and Paraguay's dictator Alfredo Stroessner. In Argentina, he founded the "Kameradenwerk" (lit. "comrades' agency"), a relief organization for Nazi war criminals. Prominent members of the "Kameradenwerk" included SS officer Ludwig Lienhardt, whose extradition from Sweden had been demanded by the Soviet Union on war crime charges; Kurt Christmann, a member of the Gestapo sentenced to 10 years for war crimes committed at Krasnodar; Austrian war criminal Fridolin Guth; and the German spy in Chile, August Siebrecht. The group maintained close contact with other internationally wanted fascists, such as Ante Pavelić and Carlo Scorza. In addition to these war criminals that fled to Argentina, the "Kameradenwerk" also assisted Nazi criminals imprisoned in Europe, including Rudolf Hess and Karl Dönitz, with food parcels from Argentina and sometimes by paying their legal fees. In Argentina, Rudel became acquainted with notorious Nazi concentration camp doctor and war criminal Josef Mengele. Rudel, together with Willem Sassen, a former Waffen-SS and war correspondent for the Wehrmacht, who initially worked as Rudel's driver, helped to relocate Mengele to Brazil by introducing him to Nazi supporter Wolfgang Gerhard. In 1957, Rudel and Mengele together travelled to Chile to meet with Walter Rauff, the inventor of the mobile gas chamber.

In Argentina, Rudel lived in Villa Carlos Paz, roughly 36 kilometers (22 mi) from the populous Córdoba City, where he rented a house and operated a brickworks. There, Rudel wrote his wartime memoirs Trotzdem ("Nevertheless" or "In Spite of Everything"). The book was published in November 1949 by the Dürer-Verlag in Buenos Aires, the publisher of a variety of apologia by former Nazis and their collaborators.

Discussion ensued in West Germany on Rudel being allowed to publish the book, because he was a known Nazi. In the book, he supported Nazi policies. This book was later re-edited and published in the United States, as the Cold War intensified, under the title, Stuka Pilot, which supported the German invasion of the Soviet Union. Pierre Clostermann, a French fighter pilot, had befriended Rudel and wrote the foreword to the French edition of his book Stuka Pilot, while RAF ace Douglas Bader wrote the foreword in the English version In 1951, he published a pamphlet Dolchstoß oder Legende? ("Stab in the Back or Legend?"), in which he claimed that "Germany's war against the Soviet Union was a defensive war", moreover, "a crusade for the whole world". In the 1950s, Rudel befriended Savitri Devi, a writer and proponent of Hinduism and Nazism, and introduced her to a number of Nazi fugitives in Spain and the Middle East.

With the help of Perón, Rudel secured lucrative contracts with the Brazilian military. He was also active as a military adviser and arms dealer for the Bolivian regime, Augusto Pinochet in Chile and Stroessner in Paraguay. He was in contact with Werner Naumann, formerly a State Secretary in Goebbels' Ministry of Public Enlightenment and Propaganda in Nazi Germany. Following the Revolución Libertadora in 1955, a military and civilian uprising that ended the second presidential term of Perón, Rudel was forced to leave Argentina and move to Paraguay. During the following years in South America, Rudel frequently acted as a foreign representative for several German companies, including Salzgitter AG, Dornier Flugzeugwerke, Focke-Wulf, Messerschmitt, Siemens and Lahmeyer International, a German consulting engineering firm.

According to the historian Peter Hammerschmidt, based on files of the German Federal Intelligence Service and the US Central Intelligence Agency (CIA), the BND, under the cover-up company "Merex", was in close contact with former SS and Nazi Party members. In 1966, Merex, represented by Walter Drück, a former Generalmajor in the Wehrmacht and BND agent, helped by the contacts established by Rudel and Sassen, sold discarded equipment of the Bundeswehr (German Federal armed forces) to various dictators in Latin America. According to Hammerschmidt, Rudel assisted in establishing contact between Merex and Friedrich Schwend, a former member of the Reich Security Main Office and involved in Operation Bernhard. Schwend, according to Hammerschmidt, had close links with the military services of Peru and Bolivia. In the early sixties, Rudel, Schwend and Klaus Barbie founded a company called "La Estrella", the star, which employed a number of former SS officers who had fled to Latin America. Rudel, through La Estrella, was also in contact with Otto Skorzeny, who had his own network of former SS and Wehrmacht officers.

Rudel returned to West Germany in 1953 and became a leading member of the Neo-Nazi nationalist political party, the German Reich Party (Deutsche Reichspartei or DRP). In the West German federal election of 1953, Rudel was the top candidate for the DRP, but was not elected to the Bundestag. According to Josef Müller-Marein, editor-in-chief of Die Zeit, Rudel had an egocentric character. Rudel heavily criticized the Western Allies during World War II for not having supported Germany in its war against the Soviet Union. Müller-Marein concluded his article with the statement: "Rudel no longer has a Geschwader (squadron)!" In 1977, he became a spokesman for the German People's Union, a nationalist political party founded by Gerhard Frey.

=== Public scandals ===
In October 1976, Rudel inadvertently triggered a chain of events, which were later dubbed the Rudel Scandal (Rudel-Affäre). The German 51st Reconnaissance Wing, the latest unit to hold the name "Immelmann", held a reunion for members of the unit, including those from World War II. The Secretary of State in the Federal Ministry of Defence, Hermann Schmidt authorized the event. Fearing that Rudel would spread Nazi propaganda on the German Air Force airbase in Bremgarten near Freiburg, Schmidt ordered that the meeting could not be held at the airbase. News of this decision reached Generalleutnant Walter Krupinski, at the time commanding general of NATO's Second Allied Tactical Air Force, and a former World War II fighter pilot. Krupinski contacted Gerhard Limberg, Inspector of the Air Force, requesting that the meeting be allowed at the airbase. Limberg later confirmed Krupinski's request, and the meeting was held on Bundeswehr premises, a decision to which Schmidt still had not agreed. Rudel attended the meeting, at which he signed his book and gave a few autographs but refrained from making any political statements.

During a routine press event, journalists who had been briefed by Schmidt questioned Krupinski and his deputy Karl Heinz Franke about Rudel's presence. In this interview, the generals compared Rudel's past as a Nazi and Neo-Nazi supporter to the career of prominent Social Democrat leader Herbert Wehner, who had been a member of the German Communist Party in the 1930s, and who had lived in Moscow during World War II, where he was allegedly involved in NKVD operations. Calling Wehner an extremist, they described Rudel as an honorable man, who "hadn't stolen the family silver or anything else". When these remarks became public, the Federal Minister of Defense Georg Leber, complying with §50 of the Soldatengesetz (Military law), ordered the generals into early retirement as of 1 November 1976. Leber, a member of the Social Democratic Party of Germany (SPD), was heavily criticized for his actions by the Christian Democratic Union (CDU) opposition, and the scandal contributed to the minister's subsequent retirement in early 1978. On 3 February 1977, the German Bundestag debated the scandal and its consequences. The Rudel Scandal subsequently triggered a military-tradition discussion, which the Federal Minister of Defense Hans Apel ended with the introduction of "Guidelines for Understanding and Cultivating Tradition" on 20 September 1982.

During the 1978 World Cup, held in Argentina, Rudel visited the Germany national team in its training camp in Ascochinga. The German media criticized the German Football Association, and viewed Rudel's visit as being sympathetic to the military dictatorship that ruled Argentina following the 1976 Argentine coup d'état. During the 1958 FIFA World Cup in Sweden, he visited the German team at Malmö on 8 June 1958. There he was welcomed by team manager Sepp Herberger.

== Personal life, death and funeral ==
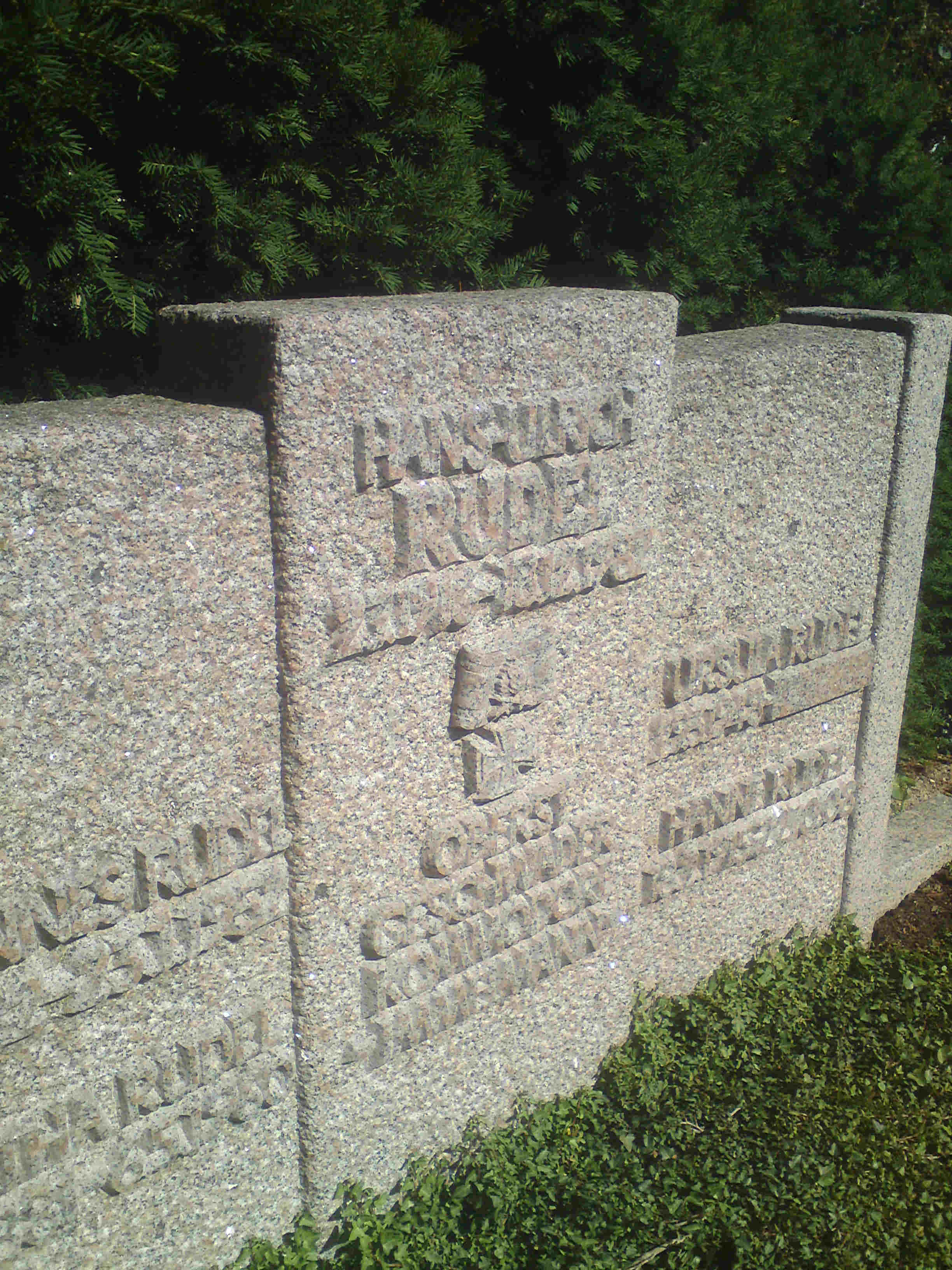
Rudel's grave in Dornhausen

Rudel was married three times. His 1942 marriage to Ursula Bergmann, nicknamed "Hanne", produced two sons. They divorced in 1950. According to the news magazine Der Spiegel, one reason for the divorce was that his wife had sold some of his decorations, including the Oak Leaves with Diamonds, to an American collector, but she also refused to move to Argentina. On 27 March 1951, Der Spiegel published Ursula Rudel's denial of selling his decorations, and further stated she had no intention of doing so. Rudel married his second wife, Ursula née Daemisch, in 1965. The marriage produced his third son was born in 1969. Rudel survived a stroke on 26 April 1970. Following his divorce in 1977, he married Ursula née Bassfeld.

Rudel died following another stroke in Rosenheim on 18 December 1982, and was buried in Dornhausen on 22 December 1982. During Rudel's burial ceremony, two Bundeswehr F-4 Phantoms appeared to make a low altitude flypast over his grave. Dornhausen was situated in the middle of a flightpath regularly flown by military aircraft, and Bundeswehr officers denied deliberately flying aircraft over the funeral. Four mourners were photographed giving Nazi salutes at the funeral, and were investigated under a law banning the display of Nazi symbols. The Federal Minister of Defence Manfred Wörner declared that the flight of the aircraft had been a normal training exercise.

== Summary of military career ==
Rudel flew 2,530 combat missions on the Eastern Front of World War II. The majority of these were undertaken while flying the Junkers Ju 87, although 430 were flown in ground-attack variants of the Focke-Wulf Fw 190. He was credited with the destruction of 519 tanks, severely damaging the battleship Marat, as well as sinking a cruiser (incomplete and heavily damaged Petropavlovsk), a destroyer (the Leningrad-class destroyer Minsk) and 70 landing craft. Rudel also claimed to have destroyed more than 800 vehicles of all types, over 150 artillery, anti-tank or anti-aircraft positions, 4 armored trains, as well as numerous bridges and supply lines. Rudel was also credited with 9 aerial victories, 7 of which were fighter aircraft and 2 Ilyushin Il-2s. He was shot down or forced to land 30 times due to anti-aircraft artillery, was wounded five times and rescued six stranded aircrew from enemy-held territory.

In 1976, Rudel attended a conference in the United States with various members of the United States military and defense industry as part of the continuous development of the A-10 Thunderbolt II; Rudel's status as a highly decorated attack aircraft pilot and particularly his experience at destroying Soviet tanks from the air was considered relevant to a potential conflict between NATO and the Warsaw Pact.

Rudel received the following decorations:

- Honor Goblet of the Luftwaffe as Oberleutnant in a Sturzkampfgeschwader (20 October 1941)
- Iron Cross (1939) 2nd Class (10 November 1939) & 1st Class (15 July 1941)
- Knight's Cross of the Iron Cross with Golden Oak Leaves, Swords, and Diamonds
  - Knight's Cross on 6 January 1942 as Oberleutnant and Staffelkapitän of the 9./Sturzkampfgeschwader 2
  - 229th Oak Leaves on 14 April 1943 as Oberleutnant and Staffelkapitän of the 1./Sturzkampfgeschwader 2 "Immelmann"
  - 42nd Swords on 25 November 1943 as Hauptmann and Gruppenkommandeur of the III./Sturzkampfgeschwader 2 "Immelmann"
  - 10th Diamonds on 29 March 1944 as Major and Gruppenkommandeur of the III./Schlachtgeschwader 2 "Immelmann"
  - 1st, and only, Golden Oak Leaves on 29 December 1944 as Oberstleutnant and Geschwaderkommodore of Schlachtgeschwader 2 "Immelmann"
- Pilot/Observer Badge In Gold with Diamonds
- Wound Badge In Gold
- German Cross In Gold
- Front Flying Clasp of the Luftwaffe in Gold with Diamonds and a badge for 2,000 missions
- Wehrmacht Long Service Award 4th class
- Sudetenland Medal
- Eastern Front Medal
- Silver Medal of Military Valor (Italy)
- 8th (1st and only foreign) Hungarian Gold Medal of Bravery (14 January 1945)

=== Promotions ===
1 June 1937:	Fahnenjunker-Gefreiter (officer cadet)
1 August 1937:	Fahnenjunker-Unteroffizier
1 December 1937:	Fähnrich (officer candidate)
19 September 1938:	Oberfähnrich, effective as of 1 September 1938
8 November 1939:	Leutnant (second lieutenant), effective as of 1 September 1938
1 September 1940:	Oberleutnant (first lieutenant)
1 April 1943:	Hauptmann (captain), with a rank age of 1 April 1942
1 March 1944:	Major (major), with a rank age of 1 October 1942
1 September 1944:	Oberstleutnant (lieutenant colonel)
1 January 1945:	Oberst (colonel)

== In fringe culture ==
Rudel remained popular with the German far-right after his death, especially with the German People's Union, the DVU, and its leader Gerhard Frey. Frey and the DVU established the Ehrenbund Rudel – Gemeinschaft zum Schutz der Frontsoldaten (Honour federation Rudel – Community for the protection of the front soldiers) in 1983 during a memorial service for Rudel. British holocaust denier David Irving was given the Hans-Ulrich Rudel Award by Frey in June 1985; he delivered a memorial speech on the death of Rudel.

== Publications ==
- Wir Frontsoldaten zur Wiederaufrüstung [We Frontline Soldiers and Our Opinion on the Rearmament of Germany] (in German). Buenos Aires, Argentina: Dürer-Verlag. 1951. OCLC 603587732.
- Dolchstoß oder Legende? [Daggerthrust or Legend?]. Schriftenreihe zur Gegenwart, Nr. 4 (in German). Buenos Aires, Argentina: Dürer-Verlag. 1951. OCLC 23669099.
- Es geht um das Reich [It is about the Reich]. Schriftenreihe zur Gegenwart, Nr. 6 (in German). Buenos Aires, Argentina: Dürer-Verlag. 1952. OCLC 48951914.
- Trotzdem [Nevertheless] (in German). Göttingen, Germany: Schütz. 1966 [1949]. OCLC 2362892.
- Stuka Pilot. Translated by Hudson, Lynton. New York: Ballantine Books. 1958. OCLC 2362892.
- Hans-Ulrich Rudel—Aufzeichnungen eines Stukafliegers—Mein Kriegstagebuch [Hans-Ulrich Rudel—Notes by a Dive Bomber Pilot—My War Diary] (in German). Kiel, Germany: ARNDT-Verlag. 2001. ISBN 978-3-88741-039-1.
- Mein Leben in Krieg und Frieden [My life in war and peace] (in German). Rosenheim, Germany: Deutsche Verlagsgesellschaft. 1994. OCLC 34396545.

Military offices
Preceded by Oberstleutnant Hans-Karl Stepp	Commander of Schlachtgeschwader 2 "Immelmann"; 1 October 1944 – 8 February 1945	Succeeded by Major Friedrich Lang
Preceded by Oberstleutnant Kurt Kuhlmey	Commander of Schlachtgeschwader 2 "Immelmann"; April 1945 – 8 May 1945	Succeeded by none
