= Chroślice =

- Village
- Location within Poland
- Coordinates: 51°5′N 16°5′E
- Country: Poland
- Voivodeship: Lower Silesian
- County: Jawor
- Gmina: Męcinka
- Population: 145

Chroślice [xrɔˈɕlit͡sɛ] is a village in the administrative district of Gmina Męcinka, within Jawor County, Lower Silesian Voivodeship, in south-western Poland.
