= Raczyce, Jawor County =

Raczyce
- Village
- Location within Poland
- Coordinates: 51°02′27″N 16°04′48″E
- Country: Poland
- Voivodeship: Lower Silesian
- Powiat: Jawor
- Gmina: Męcinka

Raczyce [raˈt͡ʂɨt͡sɛ] is a village in the administrative district of Gmina Męcinka, within Jawor County, Lower Silesian Voivodeship, in south-western Poland.
