= Sichów =

- Village
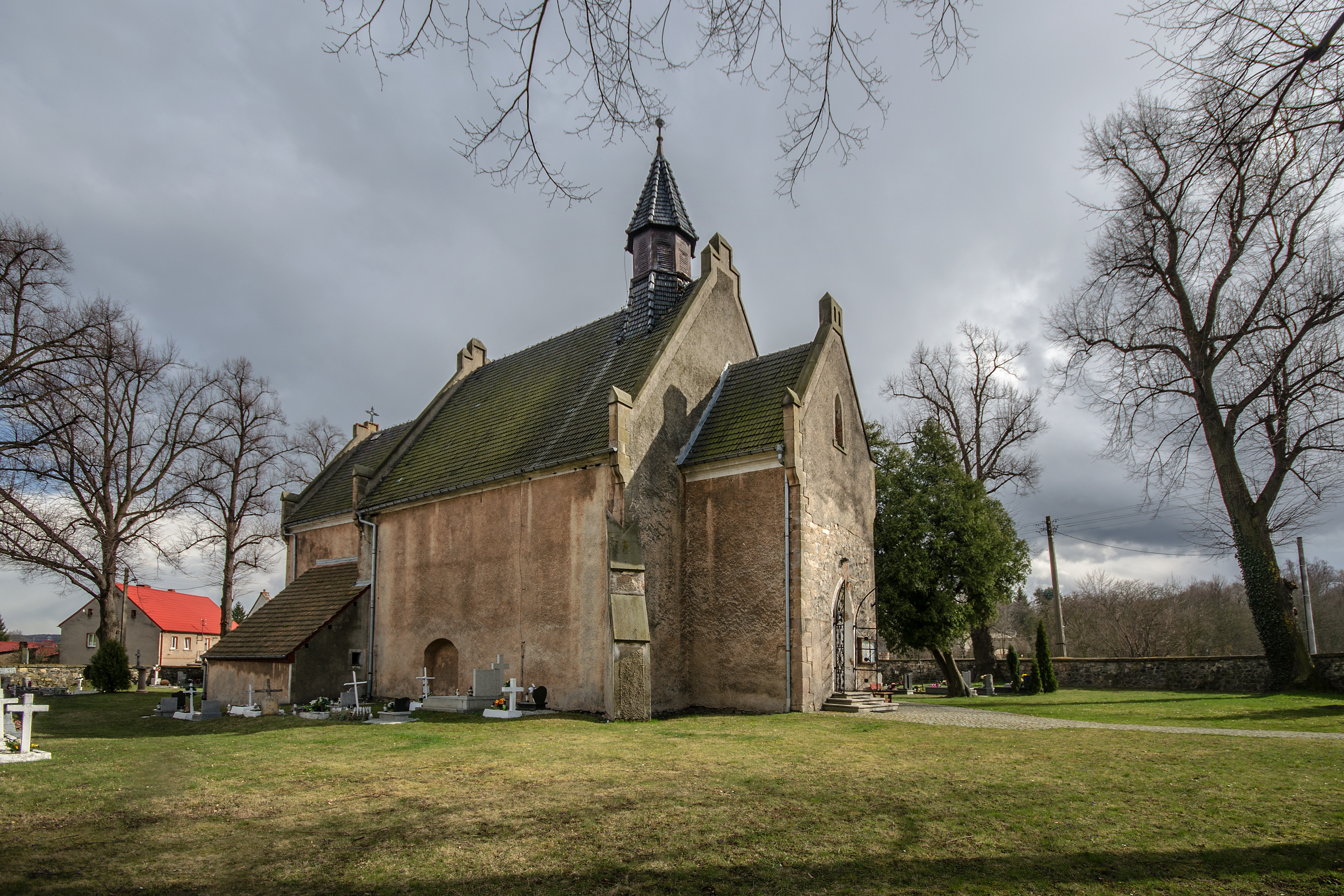

- Location within Poland
- Coordinates: 51°6′N 16°3′E
- Country: Poland
- Voivodeship: Lower Silesian
- Powiat: Jawor
- Gmina: Męcinka

Sichów [ˈɕixuf] is a village in the administrative district of Gmina Męcinka, within Jawor County, Lower Silesian Voivodeship, in south-western Poland.
