= Słup, Jawor County =

Słup
- Village
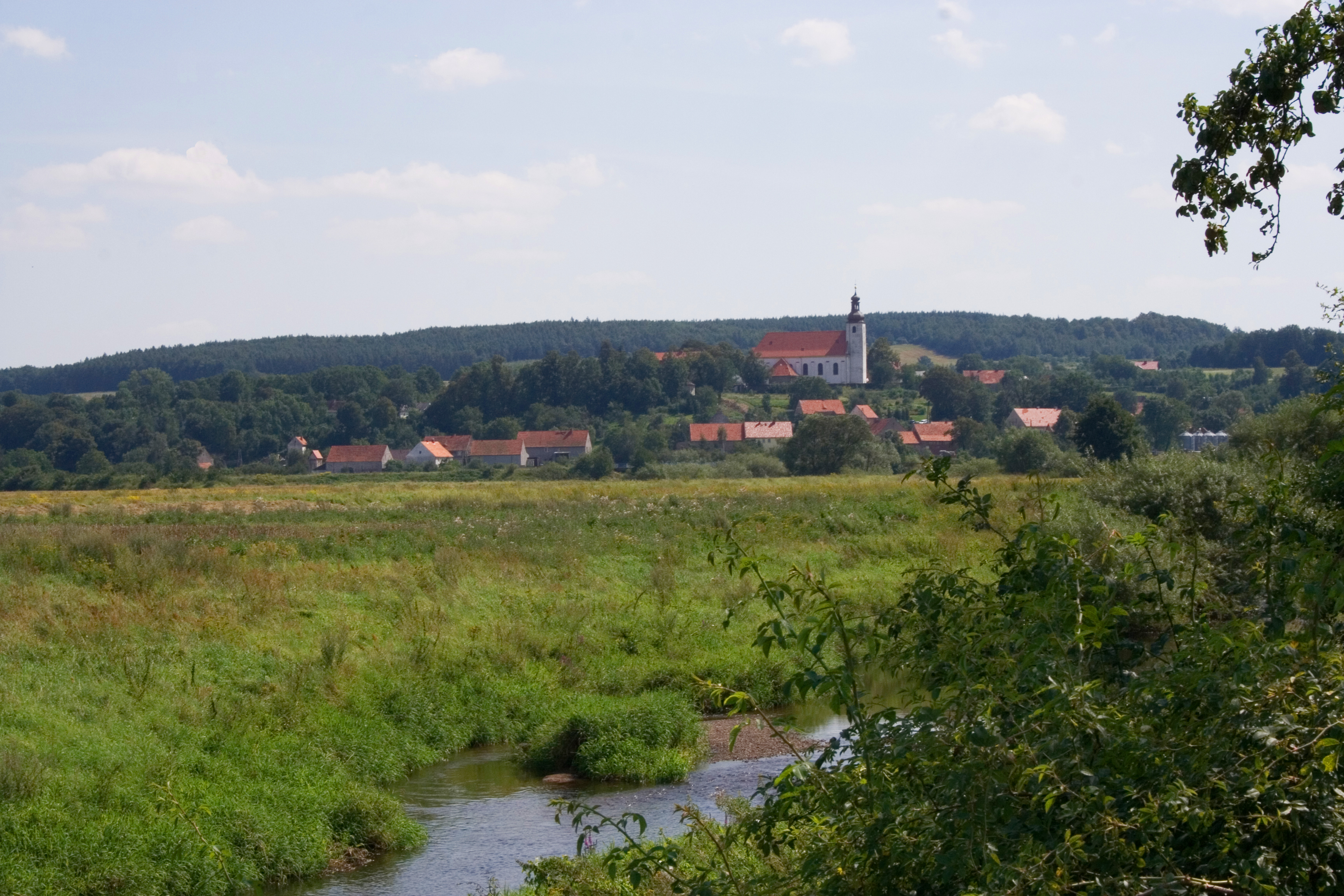

- Location within Poland
- Coordinates: 51°05′52″N 16°06′01″E
- Country: Poland
- Voivodeship: Lower Silesian
- County: Jawor
- Gmina: Męcinka
- Elevation: 190 m (620 ft)

Population
  - Total: 230
- Time zone: UTC+1 (CET)
  - Summer (DST): UTC+2 (CEST)
- Vehicle registration: DJA

Słup [swup] is a village in the administrative district of Gmina Męcinka, within Jawor County, Lower Silesian Voivodeship, in south-western Poland. It situated on the Nysa Szalona River.

During World War II, the village's Cistercian monastery held a forced resettlement camp, Schlauphof (Lager 112), that hosted hundreds of deported Luxembourgers and Lorrainers.
