= Gmina Męcinka =

Gmina Męcinka Męcinka Commune
- Gmina
- Flag Coat of arms
- Interactive map of Gmina Męcinka
- Coordinates (Męcinka): 51°4′20″N 16°5′35″E
- Country: Poland
- Voivodeship: Lower Silesian
- County: Jawor
- Seat: Męcinka
- Sołectwos: Chełmiec, Chroślice, Kondratów, Małuszów, Męcinka, Muchów, Myślinów, Piotrowice, Pomocne, Przybyłowice, Sichów, Sichówek, Słup, Stanisławów

Area
  - Total: 147.78 km^{2} (57.06 sq mi)

Population (2019-06-30)
  - Total: 4,995
  - Density: 33.80/km^{2} (87.54/sq mi)
- Website: http://www.mecinka.pl

Gmina Męcinka is a rural gmina (administrative district) in Jawor County, Lower Silesian Voivodeship, in south-western Poland. Its seat is the village of Męcinka, which lies approximately 7 kilometres (4 mi) west of Jawor and 67 km (42 mi) west of the regional capital Wrocław.

The gmina covers an area of 147.78 square kilometres (57.06 sq mi), and as of 2019 its total population is 4,995.

== Neighbouring gminas ==
Gmina Męcinka is bordered by the town of Jawor and the gminas of Bolków, Krotoszyce, Legnickie Pole, Mściwojów, Paszowice, Świerzawa and Złotoryja.

== Villages ==
The gmina contains the villages of Bogaczów, Chełmiec, Chroślice, Jerzyków, Kondratów, Małuszów, Męcinka, Muchów, Myślinów, Piotrowice, Pomocne, Przybyłowice, Raczyce, Sichów, Sichówek, Słup and Stanisławów.
