= Muchów =

- Village
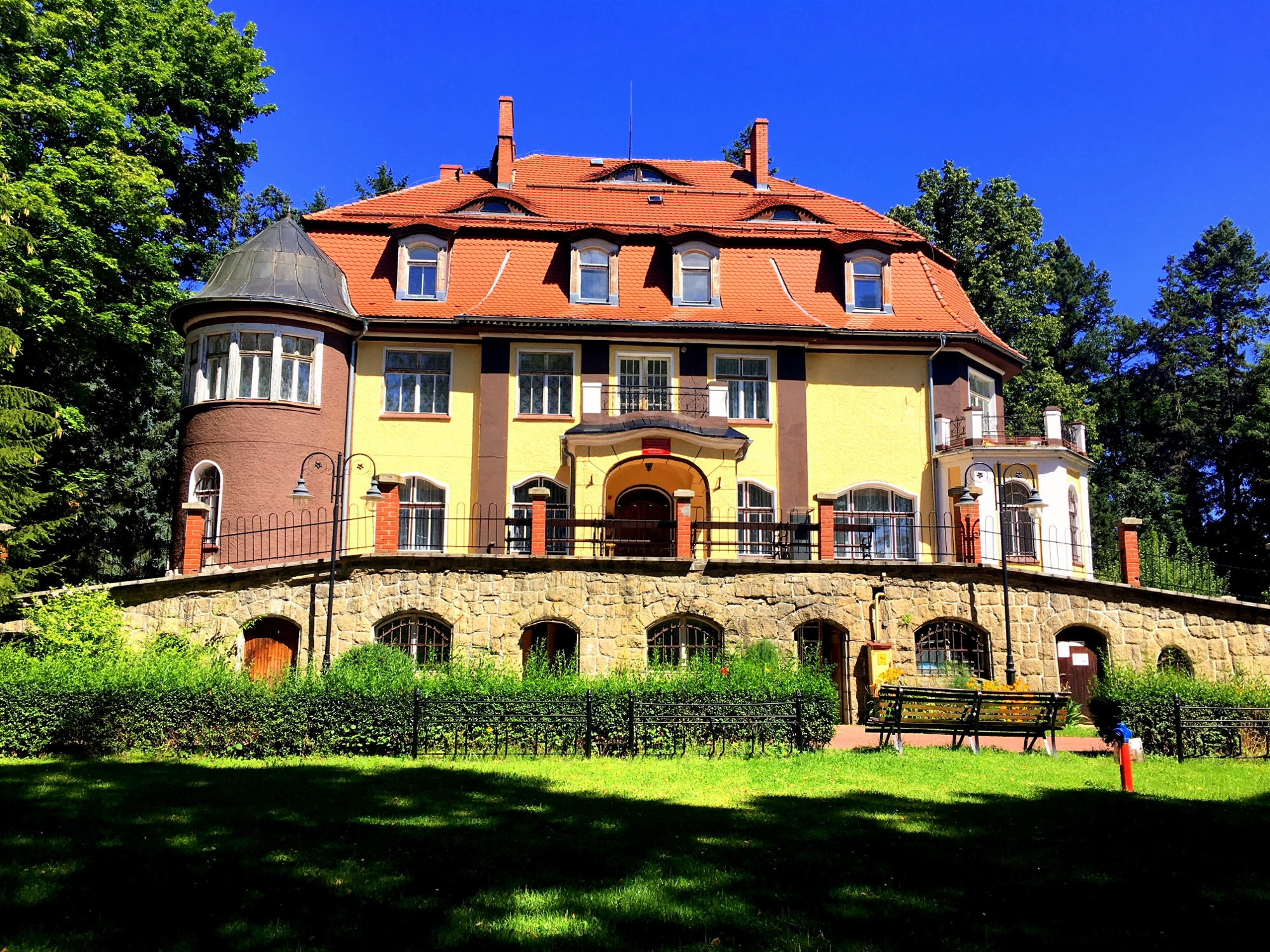
- Muchów Palace

- Location within Poland
- Coordinates: 51°1′N 16°1′E
- Country: Poland
- Voivodeship: Lower Silesian
- Powiat: Jawor
- Gmina: Męcinka
- Time zone: UTC+1 (CET)
  - Summer (DST): UTC+2 (CEST)
- Vehicle registration: DJA

Muchów [ˈmuxuf] is a village in the administrative district of Gmina Męcinka, within Jawor County, Lower Silesian Voivodeship, in south-western Poland.
