= Męcinka =

- Village
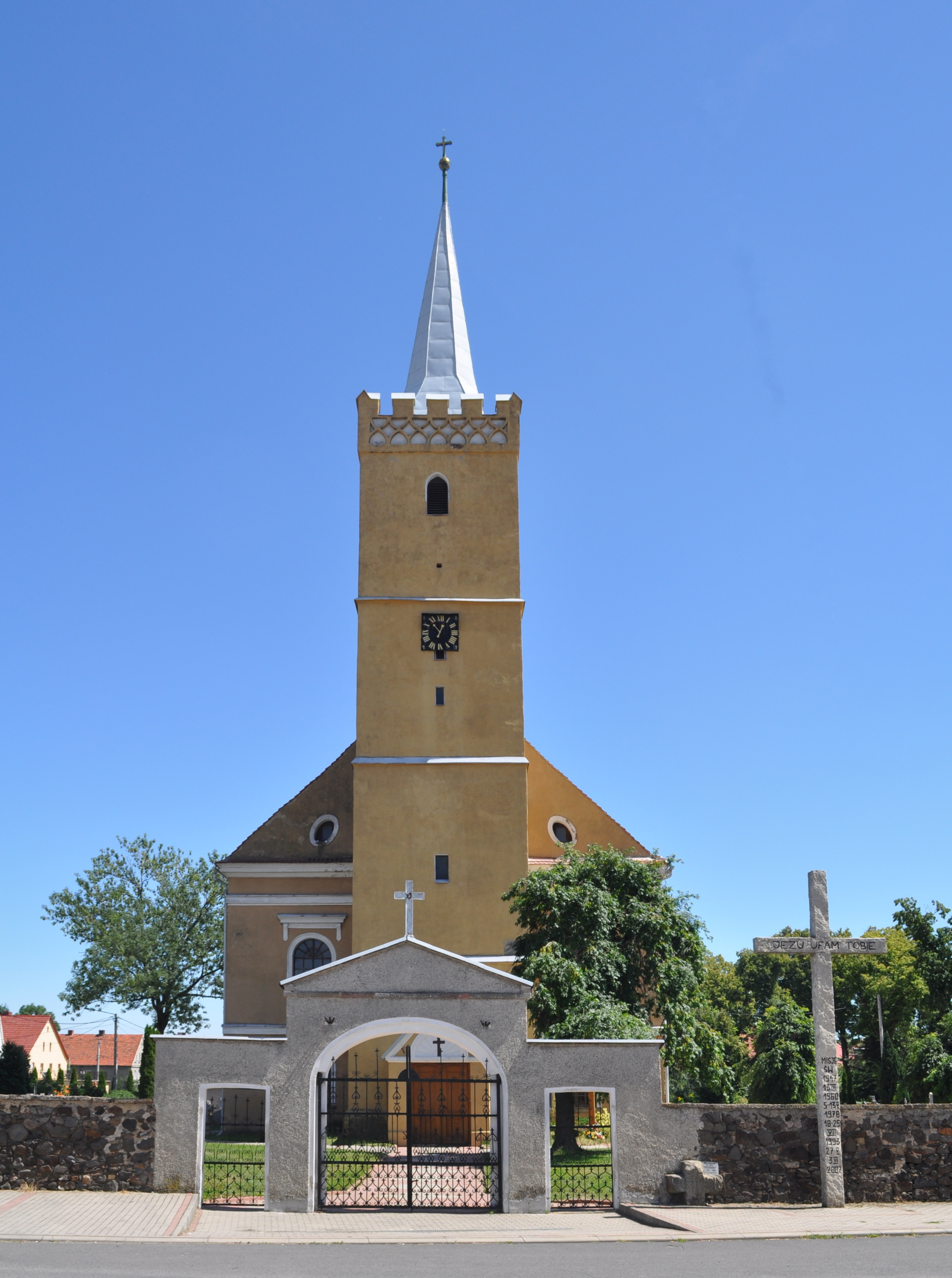
- Church in Męcinka

- Location within Poland
- Coordinates: 51°4′20″N 16°5′35″E
- Country: Poland
- Voivodeship: Lower Silesian
- County: Jawor
- Gmina: Męcinka

Męcinka [mɛnˈt͡ɕinka] (German: Herrmannsdorf) is a village in Jawor County, Lower Silesian Voivodeship, in south-western Poland. It is the seat of the administrative district (gmina) called Gmina Męcinka.

During Prussian and later German rule, the village was known as Herrmannsdorf. Polish-American anti-communist Jozef Mlot-Mroz was born in the village in 1921.
