= Jozef Mlot-Mroz =

Polish-American anti-communist (1921–2002)

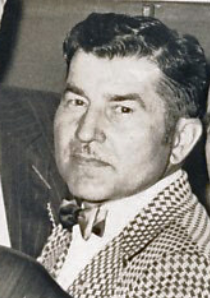
- Jozef Mlot-Mroz in 1972
- Born: Józef Wladyslaw Mróz; January 21, 1921; Herrmannsdorf, Lower Silesia, Weimar Republic (now Męcinka, Poland)
- Died: October 31, 2002 (aged 81); Groton, Connecticut, United States
- Burial place: Saint Mary's Cemetery, Salem, Massachusetts
- Organizations: Polish Freedom Fighters, Inc.; New England Captive Nations Committee
- Political party: Polish Peasant Party
- Spouse: Barbara C. Thompson (m. 1970)
- Military service
- Allegiance: Polish Underground State

Jozef Mlot-Mroz (Note: First name sometimes spelled "Josef" or "Joseph") (born Józef Wladyslaw Mróz; January 21, 1921 – October 31, 2002) was a Polish-American anti-communist, right-wing political activist and antisemitic conspiracy theorist.

During the Second World War, Mroz fought with the Polish Home Army against the German occupation of Poland, and after the war ended he continued to participate in subversive activities against communist authorities, for which he was imprisoned. After escaping Soviet captivity he fled to Germany and eventually emigrated to the United States, where he became a prolific anti-communist protester and opponent of the civil rights movement known for his inflammatory protest signs and provocative activity.

A political conservative, Mroz opposed racial integration and abortion rights, and supported American involvement in the Vietnam War. His political positions were tied to his belief in antisemitic and white supremacist conspiracy theories, and shortly before his death it was revealed that the extent of his activism was made possible by donations from wealthy far-right patrons.

== Early years in Europe ==
Józef Wladyslaw Mróz was born on January 21, 1921 to Kaspar and Helena Mróz (née Janocha) in the village of Herrmannsdorf (now known as Męcinka) in Lower Silesia, which at that time was part of the Weimar Republic but is now part of Poland. He attended public grammar school in Jedlicze, and high school and college in Krosno.

In 1940, during the occupation of Poland by Nazi Germany, he was imprisoned by the German Gestapo for 3 months, and upon being released joined the Underground resistance movement. In 1945 he was imprisoned for 21 months by Soviet authorities for participation in the Polish Underground, and after his release he became secretary of an air club in Krosno. He later claimed to have been promoted to second lieutenant by the General of the Army in Krakow, and being awarded the Cross of the Fighting Polish and the Silver Cross of Service. After an inspection by the Soviet NKVD found papers in his possession relating to his continued service in the Polish Underground he was arrested, but shortly before his trial he was assisted by other members of the Underground in fleeing to East Germany, travelling first to Berlin and then on to Frankfurt in West Germany in 1949, where he worked at the Bureau of Polish Affairs. During this time he also worked for the Vice President of the Polish Peasant Party and headed the party organization. At various points in his life he also worked as a freelance writer for Polish newspapers in France, Sweden and the United States.

In August 1952 he applied for a US immigration visa at the American Consulate in Frankfurt under the Displaced Persons Act of 1948. His immigration application listed his nationality as "Stateless-Polish", his occupation as "locksmith", and his last place of residence as 54 Myliusstrasse, Frankfurt. He arrived in New York City on November 26, 1952.

== Political activism in the US ==
After arriving in the United States, Mroz found work as a laborer at the Parker Brothers toy and game company in Salem, Massachusetts, where he lived with his aunt and uncle at 18 Boardman Street. He was active in several Polish immigrant organizations in the United States. He was a member of the Polish Peasant Party in the United States, and was a staunch supporter of Stanisław Mikołajczyk. In March 1955, Mroz traveled to Paris as a delegate to the convention of the Polish Peasant Party Congress, and also visited England and Spain.

=== Anti-Communism ===
On September 9, 1959, Mroz began a public hunger strike in Washington D.C. against Soviet leader Nikita Khrushchev's impending visit to the US. In an open letter to President Eisenhower, Mroz described Khrushchev as "a cold blooded murderer who sacrificed the lives of millions of people". Regarding his hunger strike, Mroz declared: "I will not eat, I will not drink, I shall give my life on the altar of patriotism". He also indicated that he had seen success in previous hunger strikes during his imprisonment in Poland and while in a refugee camp in Germany. He planned to spend the duration of his hunger strike in his car, which he initially parked in front of the White House, but after Police forced him to move his car due to illegal parking he relocated to the ellipse at the rear of the White House. His car was adorned with American and Polish flags, and a four-sided sign which read: "We Demand Freedom for Poland and Captive Nations"; "Don't Shake Khrushchev's Bloody Hand"; "Wake Up Americans, Don’t Let Khrushchev Crush You"; and "Stop Communism Now". He said that he intended his strike to last for 7–11 days; it ultimately lasted 10 days during which he lost 27lbs. However, his hunger strike failed to attract the attention he had hoped for, as the Polish, Hungarian, Lithuanian and Estonian "patriots" he had expected to join him did not show up. At the end of his strike he declared his intention to wear a black armband during Khrushchev's time in the Washington, the color black having been adopted as a symbol of mourning by those opposed to Khrushchev's visit.

On Easter Sunday in April 1960, Mroz began a march from Boston to Washington D.C. along US Route 1 as a protest against the upcoming Four Powers Summit in Paris, scheduled for May 16. Carrying a sign reading "Stop Communism - It May Be Too Late Tomorrow", he indicated his intention to begin a second hunger strike upon his arrival in early May. On the evening of May 15, 1960 a 39-year-old Mroz was arrested at the top of the Washington Monument. He had hidden on the stairs inside the monument until after it closed to visitors, then broke the lock on the north window and unfurled a 110 foot streamer of black cloth. He claimed that this was a protest against "President Eisenhower shaking the bloody hand of Khrushchev". He was initially charged with destruction of government property and creating a nuisance, but after a government recommendation the charges were dropped on the grounds that he was an alien and may get into trouble with immigration authorities. The Paris summit ultimately collapsed as a consequence of the 1960 U-2 incident which occurred the day before Mroz's arrival in Washington at the end of his march from Boston.

Former Soviet embassy in Washington D.C., a frequent target of Mroz's picketing

Mroz also frequently picketed outside the Soviet embassy in Washington and the Headquarters of the Soviet mission to the UN in New York. On June 30, 1960 - the anniversary of the 1956 Poznań riots - he was sprayed with a garden hose by an embassy employee after refusing to leave the area, but he was eventually moved away by police who informed him that it was forbidden in Washington D.C. to protest within 500 feet of an embassy. He subsequently changed into dry clothes before resuming his protest at a safe distance. On June 30 the next year, Mroz padlocked himself to the ornamental railings at the front of the Soviet embassy, and was similarly sprayed with a garden hose by an embassy employee after Mroz threw the key to the padlock into some nearby bushes. The chain connecting him to the railing was cut by a police officer with bolt cutters, and he was subsequently arrested. In a 1960 incident in New York City he was severely beaten by police and subsequently hospitalized while protesting the visit of Soviet officials to the UN, and was charged with assaulting a police officer who had asked him to discard the metal bar he was using to hold his sign.

In 1962 he was fined $10 for continuously ringing a bell atop a truck outside the Sheraton-Plaza Hotel in which President John F. Kennedy was staying, in what he explained to Chief Justice Elijah Adlow was an attempt to "warn the President and the American people of the dangers of communism". In 1963, while participating in the "Rally for God and Country", he was arrested for disturbing the peace after burning a Soviet flag on Columbus Avenue near Boston's Statler-Hilton Hotel. In 1964 he picketed against American wheat shipments to the Soviet Union being loaded at East Boston's Pier 4, paddling around the T2 tanker ship Transorleans in a dinghy, while holding a sign that read: "Wheat For Russia Helps Reds to Bury Us!"

In April 1967, Mroz held a lone counter-demonstration in New York's Central Park against a peace march protesting the Vietnam War, holding a sign calling for the bombing of the North Vietnamese capital Hanoi to end "communism and Red termites". Some of the demonstrators at the march were members of the "League for Spiritual Democracy (LSD)", one of whom offered Mroz some of the hallucinogenic drug LSD, which he declined.

In January 1968, Mroz held a counter-protest outside the Boston courthouse where Dr Benjamin Spock and four others faced Federal charges of conspiring to aid draft evasion. After accusing one of Spock's supporters of being "a Red", the man replied "I'm not a Red" before punching Mroz in the face and knocking him to the ground.

Mroz served as the head of multiple anti-Communist organizations, including as chairman of the New England Captive Nations Committee. Mroz was also critical of post-war Germany, writing in April 1960 that "along with the communistic danger there appears another, that of Germany" which "begins to voice its opinion and perhaps tomorrow in unity with communism may endanger the peace of the world." He accused the Germans of using "specialized officers" to "falsify facts" and "portray the American way of thinking and outlook for their own benefit", concluding that "against these two dangers we must arouse public opinion" in order to secure peace.

=== Opposition to the Civil Rights Movement ===
Mroz opposed policies that promoted racial integration, believing it to be a communist plot. In April 1965, he protested against a civil rights march in Boston led by Martin Luther King Jr. while holding a sign that described King as "a troublemaker" and "a liar"; quotes attributed to Harry Truman and J. Edgar Hoover, respectively. Mroz and other white picketers had marched into the crowd at the Carter Playground, but were quickly surrounded by chief marshal James Reed and other officials in order to prevent violence.

In 1965 he was fined $25 for assaulting civil rights leader Rev. Vernon E. Carter who was picketing in front of the School Committee headquarters, and in 1967 he was arrested for disturbing the peace after disrupting a Franklin Park rally led by Stokely Carmichael.

==== Stabbing incident ====
On May 10, 1968, Mroz was stabbed in Roxbury, Boston after harassing members of the Poor People's March, which Mroz had opposed since participants left Brunswick, Maine on May 8. Approximately 150 marchers were gathered at the Blue Hill Christian Center at 288 Blue Hill Avenue, waiting to board buses to Providence, Rhode Island when Mroz arrived at the scene holding a sign that read: "I Am Fighting Poverty, I Work! Have You Tried It... It Works!" Despite the wording of his sign, he was by this point describing himself as a "retired" leather worker and still lived with his aunt and uncle.

Soon after arriving at the scene, Mroz interrupted a speech by a member of the Southern Christian Leadership Conference (SCLC) by grabbing the microphone and shouting "Martin Luther King was a Communist". This enraged members of the crowd as King had been assassinated only a month earlier, and Mroz was knocked to the ground and severely beaten. Marshalls then advised him to leave for his own safety and attempted to escort him away. He was taken to a nearby building, but minutes later he returned to the location of the march and informed participants that he had been hired by the John Birch Society to expose them. Another scuffle ensued during which he was slashed by an unknown assailant with a small knife, to which he reportedly reacted by shouting "I'm stabbed! I'm stabbed! This is the first time they've ever done that to me!" and then walked around the area, bleeding profusely and shouting "look what they did to me!" He was taken to Boston City Hospital by police where he was treated for a minor slash wound requiring two stitches.

=== Opposition to Pacifism ===
Mroz also opposed pacifist movements, accusing them of being aligned with Communists. In August 1960, while counter-picketing a pacifist protest against the construction of Polaris missiles in Groton, Connecticut, he said: "I am against everything they stand for".

On April 3, 1967, 23-year-old John W. Gill pushed Jozef Mlot-Mroz into the Thames river in New London, Connecticut after Mroz set fire to a yellow canvas "submarine" that a group of pacifist protesters were attempting to launch from the city pier. Mroz had also been following the pacifists with a sign reading: "If we bombed Dresden and Nagasaki... Why not Hanoi?". Gill was not part of the pacifist group, but 26-year-old pacifist Martin Jezer jumped into the river to help Mroz. Gill was arrested for breach of the peace, but Mroz was not arrested because his actions were not witnessed by police and the pacifists would not sign a complaint. Gill was later cleared of wrongdoing as his actions were deemed a reasonable response to Mroz's attack, which the prosecutor described as "reprehensible".

=== Polish Freedom Fighters, Inc. ===
In 1953, Mroz established the "Anti-Communist Confederation of Polish Freedom Fighters in U.S.A." (ACCPFF), also known as "Polish Freedom Fighters, Inc.", which claimed almost 2,000 members by mid-1971, although very few of them would ever join Mroz at his demonstrations. In 1987 the ACCPFF was described by The Lewiston Journal as "a one-man organization", although Mroz had been described as its only member since as early as 1968. Mroz reportedly adopted the label of "freedom fighter" after being mistakenly referred to as such by Cardinal Cushing.

In July 1960, Mroz presented an award on behalf of the ACCPFF to Senator Thomas J. Dodd for "distinguished and unselfish service to the battle against communism and the freedom of the enslaved nations". In 1972, Mroz presented the same award to Benjamin H. Freedman, a Catholic convert from Judaism notable for his denial of the holocaust. Other recipients included John Birch Society co-founder Robert Welch in 1961; President Franklin Roosevelt's son-in-law Colonel Curtis Dall in 1971; white supremacist Robert E. Miles in 1983; and Walter White Jr. of the anti-Semitic group "Western Front" in 1984.

In 1984, in a ceremony led by Mroz at the Cathedral of the Pines in Rindge, New Hampshire, the ACCPFF dedicated a memorial stone to the victims of the 1940 Katyn executions of Polish military officers during the Second World War.

=== Antisemitism ===
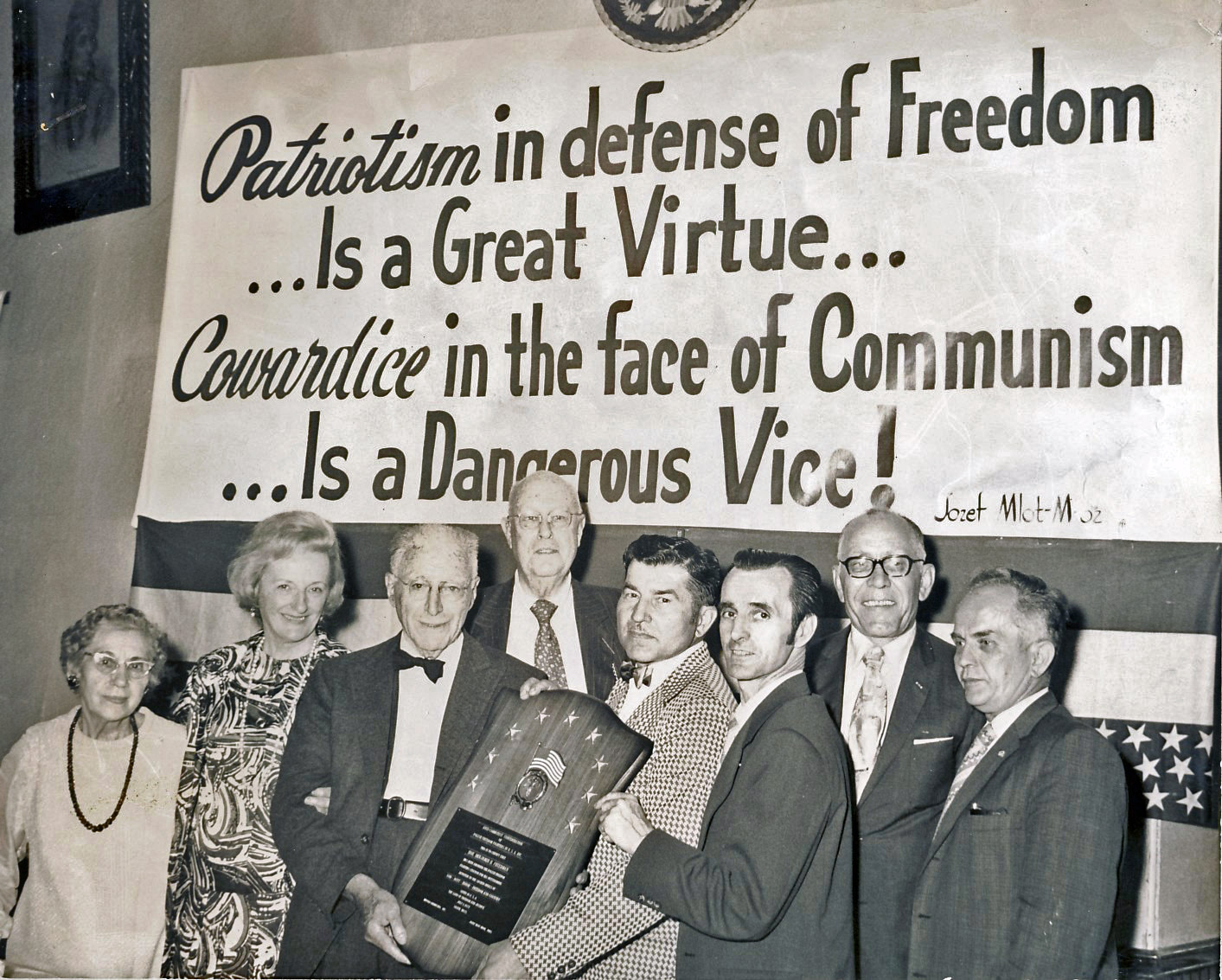
Jozef Mlot-Mroz (fourth from right) presenting an award to holocaust-denier Benjamin H. Freedman (third from left) in 1972

Mroz's protests made frequent references to antisemitic conspiracy theories, to such an extent that in 1969 he was described by The Boston Globe as "an anti-Semite disguised as an anti-Communist". He often alleged that Communism was created by Jews to destroy Christianity, using signs with phrases like "Communism is Jewish", and equating Zionism with Communism despite the Soviet Union's official policy of anti-Zionism. He also accused Jews of conspiring against white people and protested against school desegregation busing in October 1974 while holding a sign that said "Enforced Busing is a Jewish-Communist Conspiracy to Destroy the Pure White Race!"

Almost all members of Mroz's "Polish Freedom Fighters" came from Poland's peasant class, and Mroz was open about the fact that antisemitism was a staple of his life in Poland. In a taped interview he said "In Poland, peasants and laborers, they was [sic] always working for the rich Jews" and "all the business of everything were in Jews hands, but the point isn't that you know, the point is that when in 1917 the Communists took over Russia, the Jew in Poland gets power", but was quick to yield when challenged on the historical accuracy of this claim, responding "well, they didn't get power but they started to."

In July 1971 he traveled to the Federal Building on Post Office Square, Boston, where he attempted to attack Daniel Ellsberg, who was fighting extradition to California to stand trial for leaking the Pentagon Papers. He shouted antisemitic epithets at Ellsberg, calling him a "Red Jew" and a "traitor" and attempted to hit him and his wife with a large cross that bore the words "Communism is Jewish" and "Fight Jewish Communism", but missed and hit television cameramen instead.

In the 1980s he sent a package to prominent Jewish lawyer Alan Dershowitz containing a charred Israeli flag, with an accompanying letter that described Jewish people as "cockroaches and parasites". In 1987, Jozef Mlot-Mroz was described by Leonard Zakim of the Boston Anti-Defamation League as "one of the most notorious anti-Semites and racists in this entire area".

In 1989 Mroz attempted to disrupt a celebration of the 20th anniversary of the 1969 Harvard strike. He rushed to the front of the rally with a sign reading "Fight and Destroy Jewish Zionist Conspiracy Today" and attempted to address the crowd. He was shouted down with cries of "No Nazis!" and his sign was destroyed before police forced him to leave. After a Synagogue in Salem, Massachusetts was vandalized with antisemitic graffiti in the summer of that year, Mroz was arrested for breaking into the building the next day and attempting to cover up the graffiti to prevent it from generating sympathy towards the Jewish community.

=== Funding ===
Despite being a manual laborer who lived with his relatives until he married later in life, Mroz was able to travel extensively, attend countless protests and print and distribute a vast number of his own publications. He was editor of the monthly newspaper Tribune of Enslaved Nations, and also published the newsletter S.O.S.!!!, U.S.A., Ship of State, a self-described "Magazine of Timely Truths". His frequent appearances at protests as both a demonstrator and counter-demonstrator made him "a familiar figure at antiwar and civil rights demonstrations". It was reported at one point in his life that Mroz had thus far attended 746 demonstrations, been arrested 69 times, and hospitalized 7 times. The source of his funding was a mystery for most of Mroz's life, though in 1968 he claimed to have spent at least $25,000 of his own money and an unknown amount in contributions by members of the ACCPFF.

However, after the death of Richard J. Cotter - a millionaire Phillips Exeter and Harvard Law graduate from Duxbury, Massachusetts - it became apparent that Mroz's activities were funded in part by Cotter's donations to far-right groups including Mroz's "Polish Freedom Fighters". After Cotter's death in 1999, Mroz received $25,000 bequeathed to the ACCPFF in Cotter's will.

== Personal life ==
On January 11, 1970, he married Barbara C. Thompson in Townsend, Massachusetts and found work as a self-employed house painter. His public appearances thereafter diminished in frequency, but were by no means concluded.

Mroz was a Roman Catholic and was a member of several Catholic organizations, although in 1973 he was accused by the Boston Roman Catholic Archdiocesan Ecumenical Commission of "flagrant, mindless anti-Semitism", to which Mroz responded by declaring that "the church is gone, destroyed by the Jewish-Communist conspiracy". In 1984, Mroz appeared on The David Brudnoy Show on WBZ radio in Boston. David Arvedon, a Jewish rock star, civil rights activist, and frequent contributor to the program, called up to criticize Mroz, who threatened to send his thugs after him. Arvedon then threatened to tear down Mroz' house with his own two hands one brick at a time, and ended his threat by saying "I know where you live." This confrontation resulted in a million dollar lawsuit between Mroz and radio station WBZ. Arvedon released damaging personal information about Mroz on the radio. He obtained the information on Mroz by pretending to write his biography, so Mroz divulged personal information about himself. Then, at a rally in Salem, Arvedon threatened to demolish Mroz's house, and this erratic behavior caused the romantic break up between Arvedon and Madonna, who did not want to be pulled into this drama. In 1985 he joined a protest held by Roman Catholics outside a movie theater in Cambridge, Massachusetts against the film Hail Mary which Mroz described as "a disgrace" that would "destroy the morality of youth". Mroz also attended a number of anti-abortion protests, and in one instance was chastised by Cardinal Law for holding an antisemitic placard. Mroz served as president of the Holy Name Society of Saint John the Baptist parish in Salem, although his antisemitic activity meant that he was forced to resign in May 1987. He was also a teetotaler and nonsmoker.

Despite living most of his life in the United States he never naturalized as an American citizen, commenting in 1971: "I was born a Pole, and I want to die a citizen of my beloved Poland. It is my opinion that I can do more for this country by being a citizen of Poland and by fighting the Communists here than becoming a citizen".

=== Personality ===
A 1960 FBI report indicated that Mroz was "thoroughly disliked by many Poles in the Salem, Mass. area", describing him as "erratic" and "obnoxious in his activities". He would purposefully arrive at demonstrations after picketing had already started, parking his car some distance away to avoid vandalism, and often wearing a red, white and blue uniform while holding brightly-painted signs. He expressed a great enjoyment of his public protests and commented soon after his marriage in 1970 that he missed picketing. He wore a distinctive small moustache and spoke with a heavy Polish accent. He also met with anti-Communist Senator Joseph McCarthy on two occasions and regarded him as a personal hero.

Despite attempts to explain his obnoxious and erratic behaviour as a consequence of having been tortured by Communist authorities, there is no evidence that this was ever the case, and he left Poland before he could have participated in any significant anti-Communist uprisings.

== Death ==
Jozef Mlot-Mroz died at Groton Regency Health Center in Groton, Connecticut on October 31, 2002 aged 81. In addition to his wife Barbara, he was also survived by his brother Wladyslaw and three sisters Jadwiga, Michalina and Elzbieta, and predeceased by his brother Emil. He was buried in Saint Mary's Cemetery in Salem, Massachusetts. His wife Barbara died in 2013 and was buried alongside him.

A plaque commemorating Józef "Mlot" Mróz and his service in the Polish Underground Home Army was erected in Jedlicze, Poland, alongside the graves of his parents.
