= Pomocne =

- Village
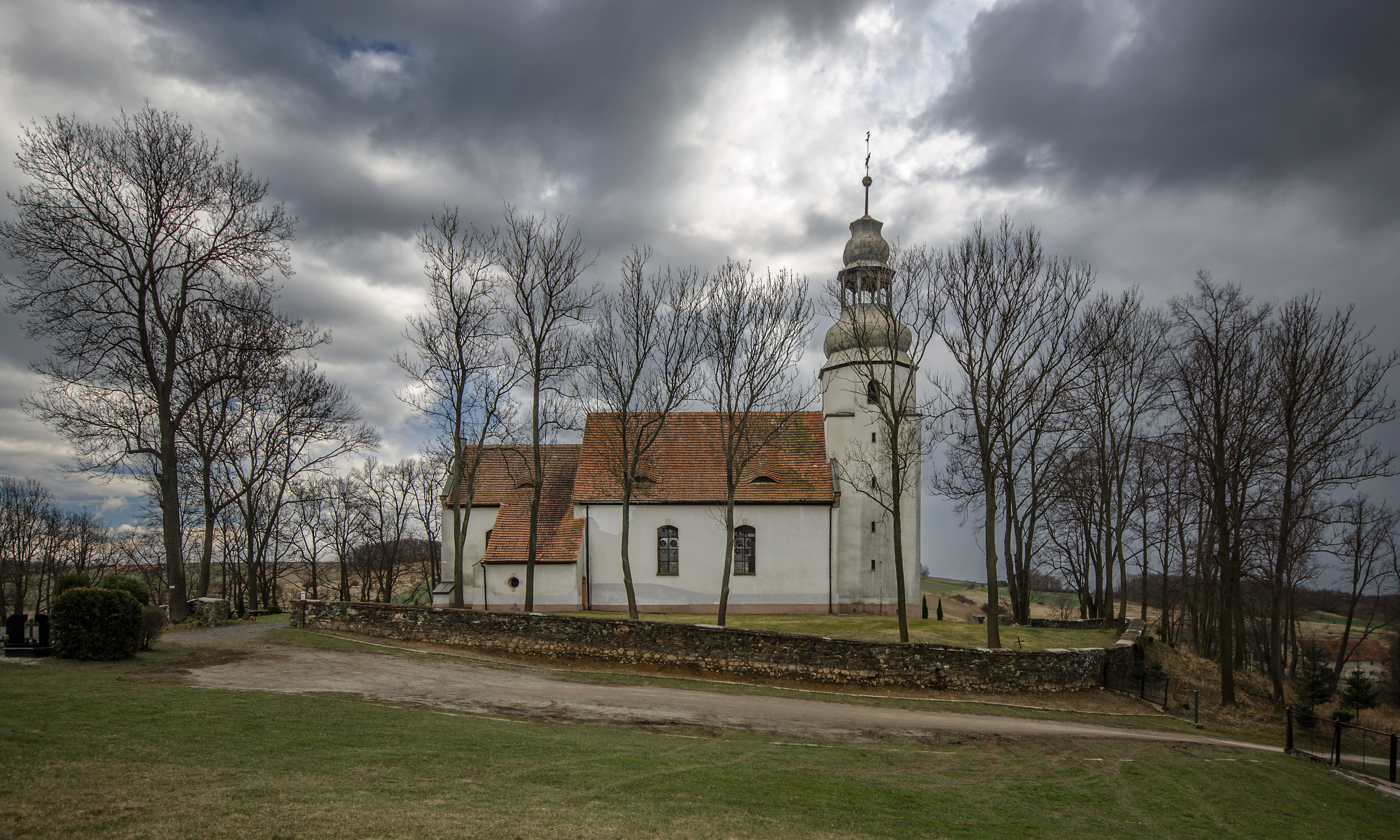

- Location within Poland
- Coordinates: 51°3′N 16°2′E
- Country: Poland
- Voivodeship: Lower Silesian
- County: Jawor
- Gmina: Męcinka

Pomocne [pɔˈmɔt͡snɛ] is a village in the administrative district of Gmina Męcinka, within Jawor County, Lower Silesian Voivodeship, in south-western Poland.
