= Alexander Andrae =

German general (1888–1979)

- Born: 27 April 1888; Kösling, Silesia, Prussia, German Empire
- Died: 3 April 1979 (aged 90); Wiesbaden, Hesse, Federal Republic of Germany (West Germany)
- Military career
- Allegiance: German Empire; Weimar Republic; Nazi Germany
- Branch: Imperial German Army; German Army; Sicherheitspolizei; Luftwaffe
- Rank: General der Flieger; General der Artillerie
- Conflicts: World War I; World War II
- Awards: Iron Cross

Alexander Andrae (27 April 1888 – 3 April 1979), whose first name is often mistakenly given as Waldemar, was a German military officer from Kösling, Upper Silesia. Initially pursuing an Army career, he then joined the security police and eventually the Luftwaffe.

During World War II he was appointed military governor of Crete. After the war, he was tried and imprisoned for war crimes committed there under his command.

== Early life, World War I and Interbellum ==
Andrae was born in 1888 and joined the army in 1906. During World War I, he served with the 56th Field-Artillery-Brigade, in the Staffs of the 2nd Army, the 25th Infantry Division, the 9th Landwehr Division and the XVI Army Corps.

After the end of World War I, he remained in the Reichswehr, from which he retired in 1920. He then moved to the security police, where he stayed until 1935 when he re-entered the army. In August 1936, he joined the then newly established Luftwaffe.

== World War II ==
Serving in the Luftwaffe as the Commander of Air Region Staffs 17 (Poland), 300 (Denmark), Balkans, and Crete, Andrae took part in the campaigns against Poland, Denmark, the Balkans and Crete, respectively. In June 1941, he succeeded Kurt Student as the Commander-in-Chief of "Fortress Crete". Under his command, thousands of civilian residents of Crete were tortured or executed. During 1942, SOE agent Xan Fielding was considering a plan to capture Andrae. This plan never materialized, since in fall 1942, Andrae was assigned to the Reich Air Ministry, leaving the command of Crete to paratrooper General Bruno Bräuer. However, the idea of capturing a German general evolved into the abduction of Gen. Kreipe. Andrae retired from service in May 1943, to be called again for active duty as an artillery General in April 1945 with the 4th Panzer Army.

== Post-war ==
After the surrender of Germany in May 1945, Andrae was captured by the British and then extradited to Greece to be tried for war crimes he was responsible for while in Crete. In 1947, he was condemned to four life sentences. In 1951, his sentence was commuted by King Paul of Greece to four years imprisonment. As a result, after spending four years in prison, he was released in January 1952. Later, Andrae co-founded the German Reich Party.
