= Chełmiec, Lower Silesian Voivodeship =

Chełmiec
- Village
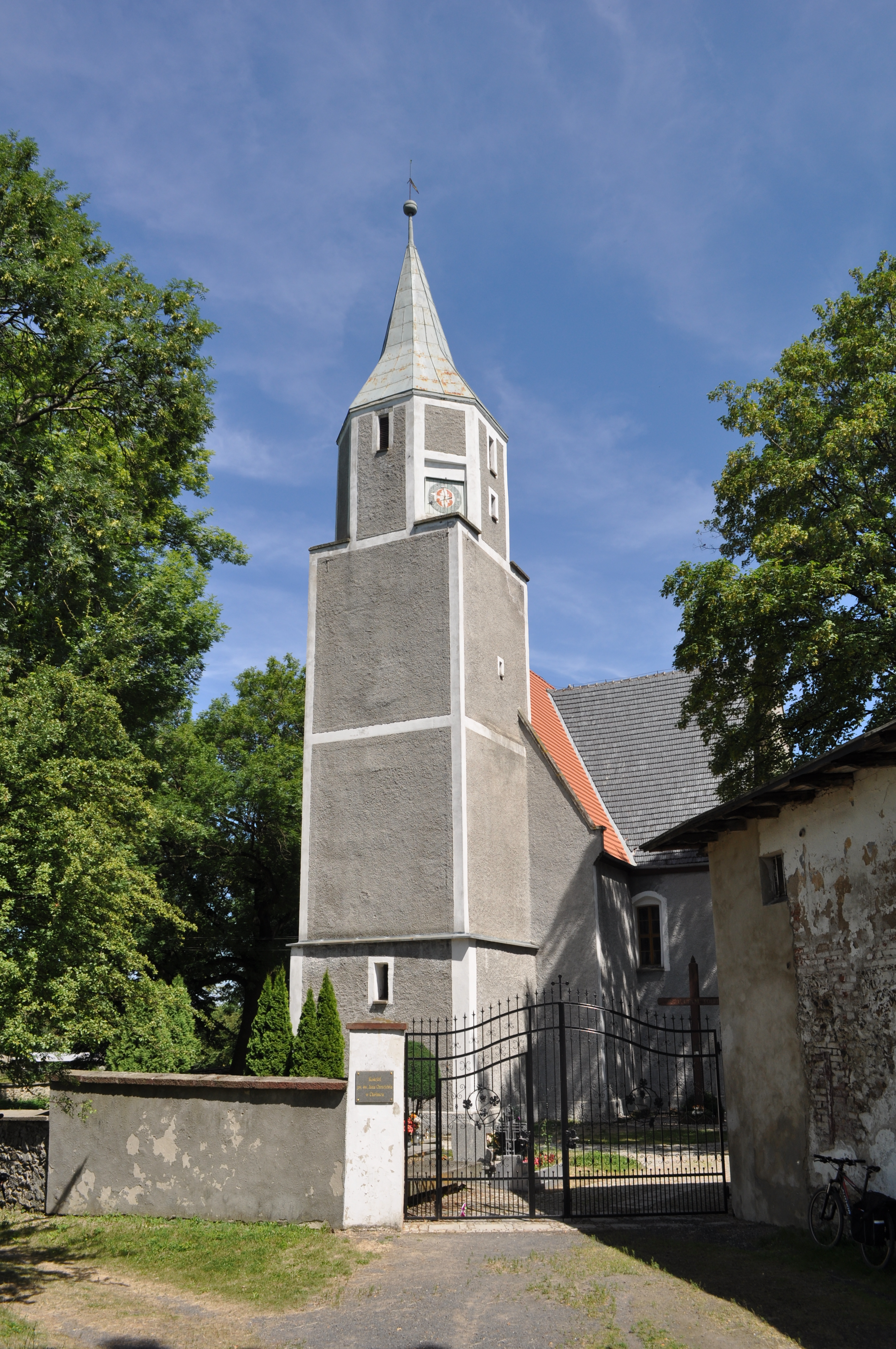
- Church in Chełmiec

- Location within Poland
- Coordinates: 51°02′30″N 16°06′39″E
- Country: Poland
- Voivodeship: Lower Silesian
- County: Jawor
- Gmina: Męcinka
- Population: 320

Chełmiec [ˈxɛu̯mjɛt͡s] is a village in the administrative district of Gmina Męcinka, within Jawor County, Lower Silesian Voivodeship, in south-western Poland.
