= Piotrowice, Jawor County =

Piotrowice
- Village
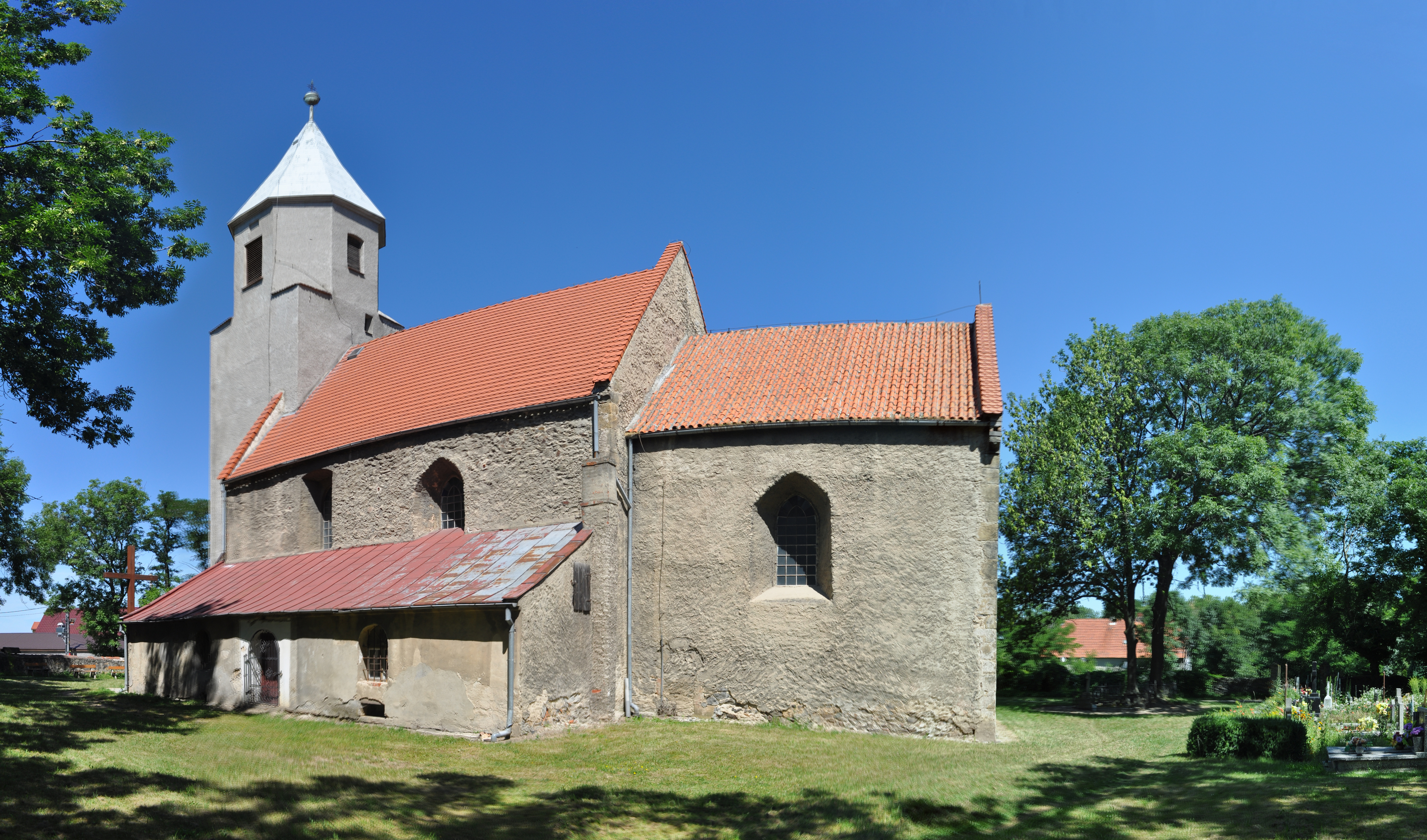
- Church in Piotrowice

- Location within Poland
- Coordinates: 51°3′39″N 16°8′38″E
- Country: Poland
- Voivodeship: Lower Silesian
- County: Jawor
- Gmina: Męcinka
- Elevation: 215 m (705 ft)

Population
  - Total: 1,046
- Time zone: UTC+1 (CET)
  - Summer (DST): UTC+2 (CEST)
- Vehicle registration: DJA

Piotrowice [pjɔtrɔˈvit͡sɛ] is a village in the administrative district of Gmina Męcinka, within Jawor County, Lower Silesian Voivodeship, in south-western Poland.

== History ==
In 1842, the village had a population of 1,386.

In the final stages of World War II, on 30 January 1945, a German-organized death march of Allied prisoners of war from the Stalag Luft 7 POW camp stopped in the village.
