= Sichówek =

- Village
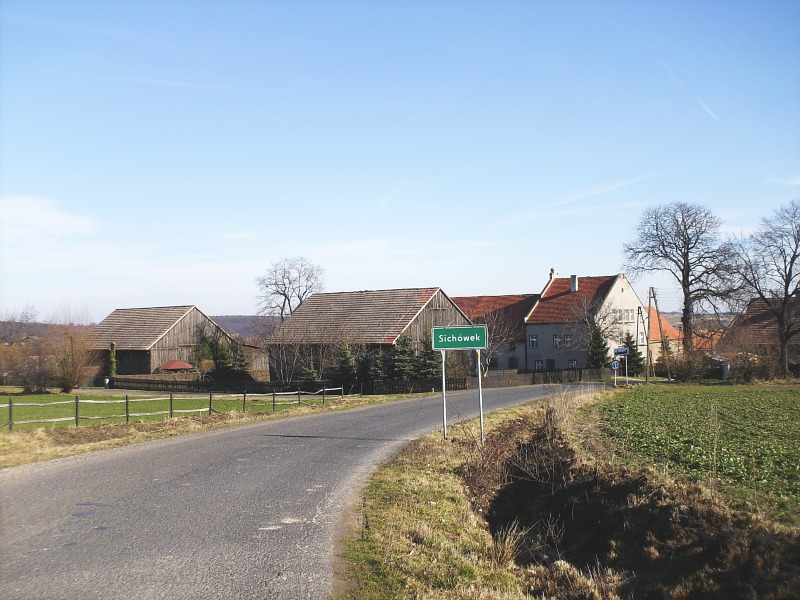

- Location within Poland
- Coordinates: 51°07′N 16°04′E
- Country: Poland
- Voivodeship: Lower Silesian
- County: Jawor
- Gmina: Męcinka
- Population: 86

Sichówek [ɕiˈxuvɛk] is a village in the administrative district of Gmina Męcinka, within Jawor County, Lower Silesian Voivodeship, in south-western Poland.
