= Stanisławów, Lower Silesian Voivodeship =

Stanisławów
- Village
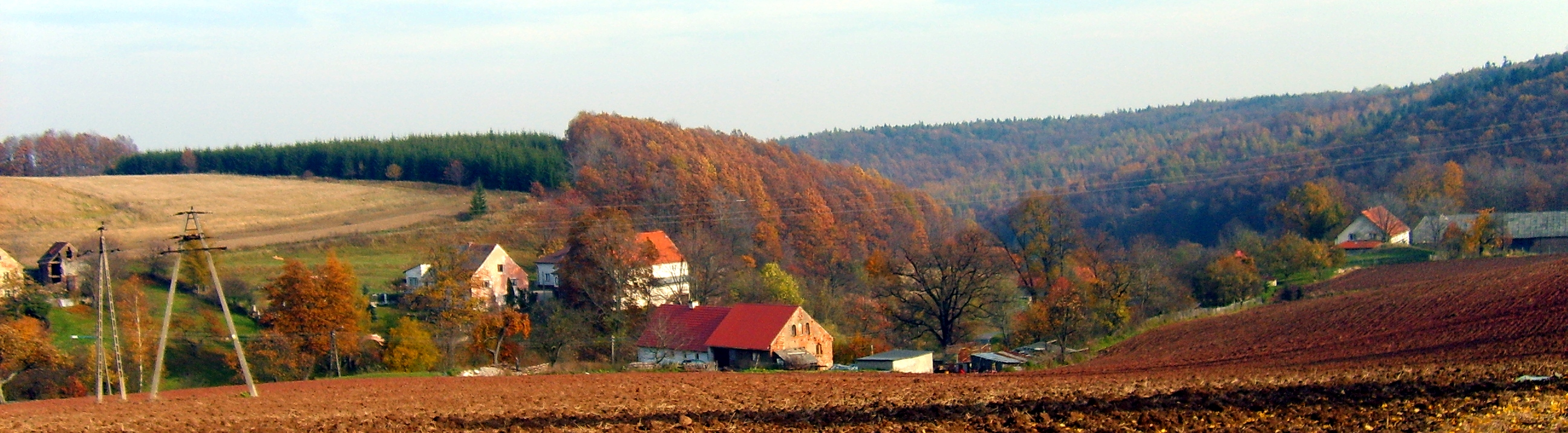

- Location within Poland
- Coordinates: 51°04′13″N 16°00′38″E
- Country: Poland
- Voivodeship: Lower Silesian
- Powiat: Jawor
- Gmina: Męcinka
- Population: 150

Stanisławów [staniˈswavuf] is a village in the administrative district of Gmina Męcinka, within Jawor County, Lower Silesian Voivodeship, in south-western Poland.

== Notable residents ==
- Bruno Bräuer (1893–1947), Wehrmacht general
