= Przybyłowice =

- Village
- Location within Poland
- Coordinates: 51°02′30″N 16°06′39″E
- Country: Poland
- Voivodeship: Lower Silesian
- Powiat: Jawor
- Gmina: Męcinka
- Elevation: 165 m (541 ft)
- Population: 220

Przybyłowice [pʂɨbɨwɔˈvit͡sɛ] is a village in the administrative district of Gmina Męcinka, within Jawor County, Lower Silesian Voivodeship, in south-western Poland.
