= Kozłówki, Opole Voivodeship =

Kozłówki
- Village
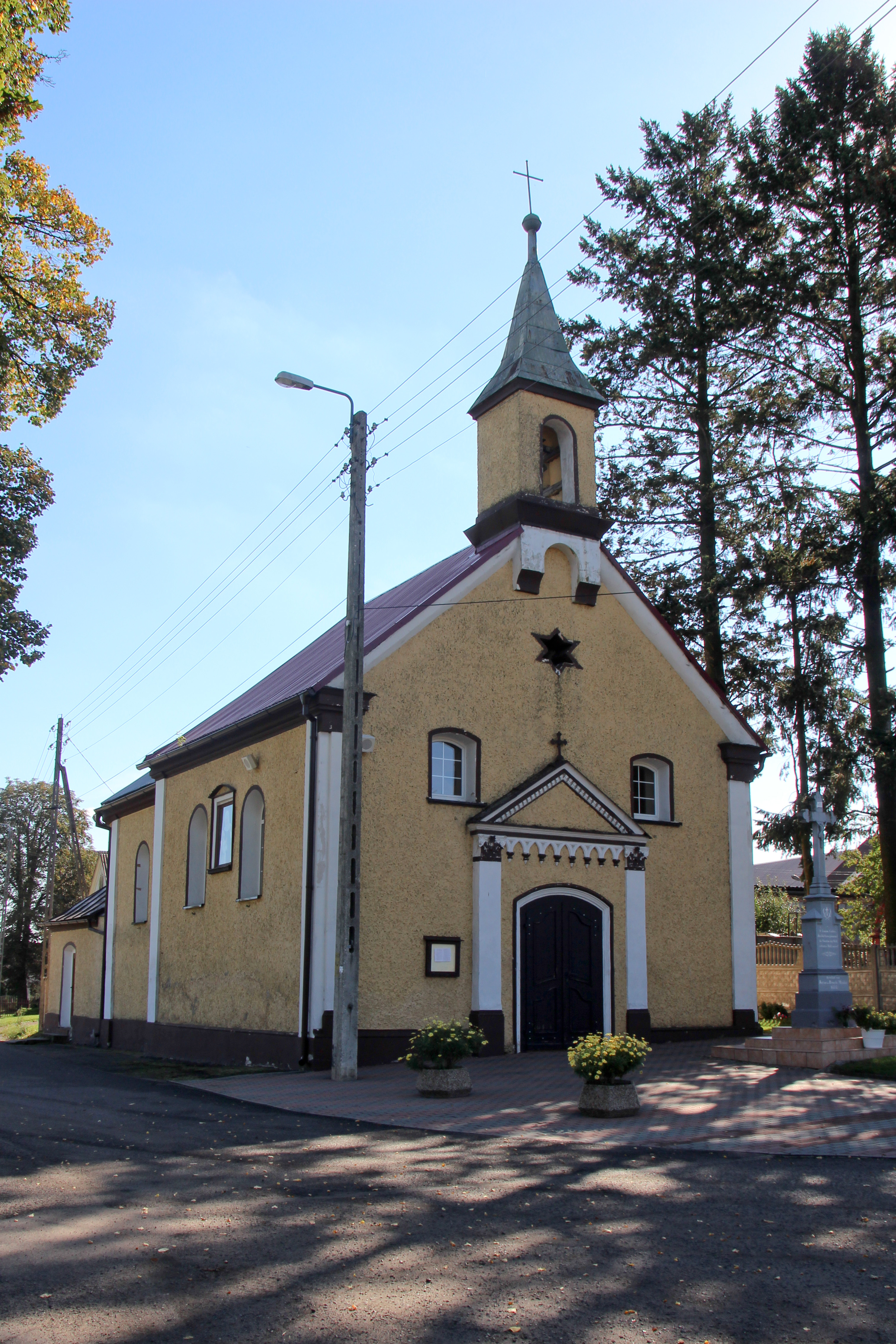
- St. Anna's Chapel (built in 1842) in Kozłówki

- Location within Poland
- Coordinates: 50°5′N 17°58′E
- Country: Poland
- Voivodeship: Opole
- County: Głubczyce
- Gmina: Kietrz
- Population: 184 (2,007)
- Postal Code: 48-130
- Car plates: OGL
- SIMC: 0496024

Kozłówki [kɔˈzwufki] is a village in the administrative district of Gmina Kietrz, within Głubczyce County, Opole Voivodeship, in south-western Poland, close to the Czech border.

== Notable residents ==
- Alexander Andrae (1888-1979), Luftwaffe general
