= Bruno Bräuer =

German paratrooper general (1893–1947)

- Born: 4 February 1893; Willmannsdorf, Silesia, Kingdom of Prussia, German Empire now Stanisławów, Lower Silesian Voivodeship, Poland
- Died: 20 May 1947 (aged 54); Athens, Greece
- Cause of death: Execution by firing squad
- Military career
- Allegiance: German Empire (to 1918); Weimar Republic (to 1933); Nazi Germany
- Branch: Luftwaffe
- Rank: General der Fallschirmtruppe
- Commands: "Fortress Crete"
- Conflicts: World War I World War II
- Awards: Knight's Cross of the Iron Cross

Bruno Oswald Bräuer (4 February 1893 – 20 May 1947) was a general in the paratroop forces of Nazi Germany during World War II. He served as a commander on Crete (called Fortress Crete by the Germans) and then commanded the 9th Paratroop Division. After the war, he was convicted of war crimes and executed, along with Friedrich-Wilhelm Müller, on the anniversary of the Axis invasion of Crete.

== Early career ==
Bruno Oswald Bräuer was born in Willmannsdorf, Silesia, on 4 February 1893. Living in Annaburg, he became a cadet on 27 April 1905. He subsequently fought during the First World War in the 7th West Prussian Infantry Regiment Nr. 155, winning both classes of the Iron Cross. He continued in the military after the end of the war, joining the Reichswehr, and was promoted to leutnant on 7 August 1919. He left the army soon afterwards, becoming a police officer on 1 January 1920.

Bräuer was one of the first members of the Wecke State Police Group founded by Hermann Göring on 25 February 1933, being made commander of the unit's 1st Company. The regiment was transferred to the Luftwaffe in 1935, becoming the Regiment General Göring. Bräuer, by that time a police major, was promoted to oberstleutnant on 1 January 1938. He commanded the regiment's I Battalion until 23 November when he was transferred to command the 1st Parachute Regiment and then, on 1 January 1939, promoted to oberst.

== World War II ==
Bräuer served during the Invasion of Poland in 1939, again winning both classes of the Iron Cross. He then participated with his regiment in the German invasion of the Netherlands, participating in airborne operations attacking Fortress Holland. Fighting around Dordrecht, he received the Knight's Cross of the Iron Cross for "heroic personal actions in the employment and command of his regiment".

In November 1942, Bräuer replaced General Alexander Andrae as commander on Crete. On 25 March 1943, Greek Independence Day, he released 100 Cretans jailed in Agia prison. Among them was Konstantinos Mitsotakis, who later became Prime Minister of Greece. After German failures at Stalingrad and El Alamein, Bräuer ordered the construction of underground command bunkers, more defences around Suda Bay and increased ammunition stocks. He was replaced by General Friedrich-Wilhelm Müller on 31 May 1944.

In January 1945, the German 9th Parachute Division was formed under Bräuer, mostly made up of Luftwaffe ground forces. That same month, two of his battalions were encircled and defeated by the 1st Ukrainian Front in Breslau. The rest of the division retreated back to the Seelow Heights. Many of the troops fled when the Soviet barrage began. Before long, the line had nearly completely collapsed, and many of Bräuer's men began to desert. He suffered a nervous collapse and was relieved of his command.

== Conviction and execution ==
After his capture by the British, he was extradited to Greece for the deportation of the Cretan Jewish Greeks in May 1944 and put on trial there. (At the end of May 1944, the Jewish citizens of Crete were arrested and shipped on the Danae to continental Europe. On 8 June, the ship was sunk by HMS Vivid.) Along with General Friedrich-Wilhelm Müller, Bräuer was charged with war crimes by a Greek military court. He stood trial in Athens for atrocities on Crete. Under the prosecution of Admiral Nicholas Zacharias, the Greek naval prosecutor, Bräuer was accused of the deaths of 3,000 Cretans, massacres, systematic terrorism, deportation, pillage, wanton destruction, torture and ill treatment. Bräuer was convicted and sentenced to death on 9 December 1946. He was executed by firing squad at 5 o'clock on 20 May 1947, the anniversary of the Axis invasion of Crete. Historian Antony Beevor called him "a truly unfortunate man", having been executed for crimes "committed under another general".

== Burial ==
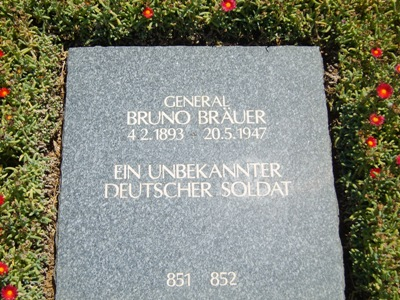
Bräuer's gravestone.

Three years later, the Association of German Airborne troops requested that Brauer's remains be moved to Crete and reinterred on Hill 107, with German troops killed on the island during the invasion and the occupation. His remains were buried by George Psychoundakis, resistance fighter and author of The Cretan Runner. His grave can be found in the far left corner of the cemetery next to an unknown soldier.

== Awards ==
- Iron Cross (1914) 2nd Class (15 October 1914) & 1st Class (1 April 1917)
- Clasp to the Iron Cross (1939) 2nd Class (20 October 1939) & 1st Class (23 May 1940)
- Knight's Cross of the Iron Cross on 24 May 1940 as commander of Fallschjäger-Regiment 1
- German Cross in Gold on 31 March 1942 as commander of Fallschjäger-Regiment 1

Military offices
Preceded by Generalleutnant Gustav Wilke	Commander of 9. Fallschirmjäger-Division; 2 March 1945 – 18 April 1945	Succeeded by Oberst Harry Herrmann
