= Boston Transit Commission Building =

- U.S. National Register of Historic Places
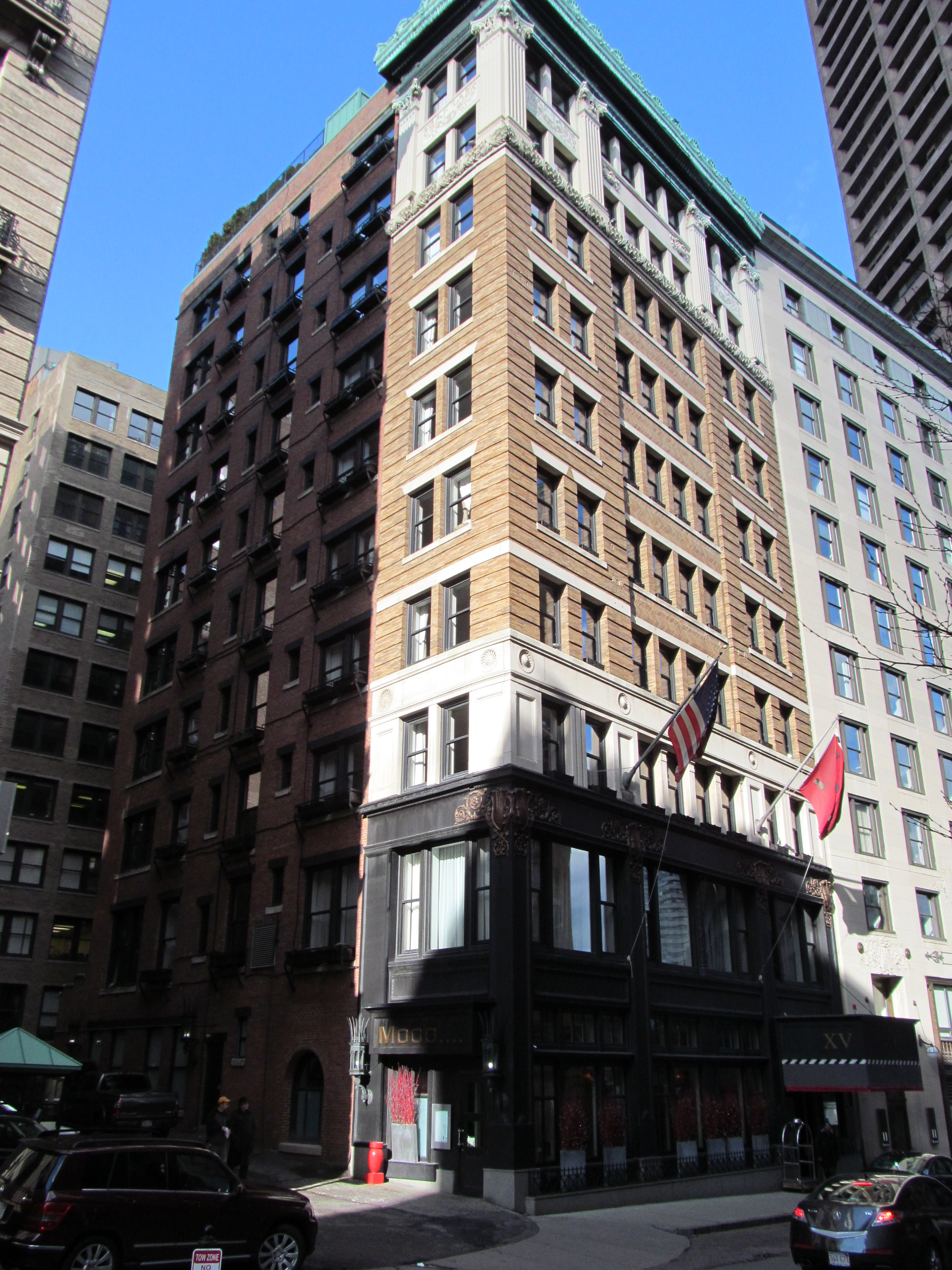
- Boston Transit Commission Building

- Location within Boston Location within Massachusetts Location within the United States
- Location: Boston, Massachusetts
- Coordinates: 42°21′29.91″N 71°3′42.95″W
- Architect: William Gibbons Preston
- Architectural style: Classical Revival, Beaux Arts
- NRHP reference No.: 07000861
- Added to NRHP: August 31, 2007

The Boston Transit Commission Building is an historic office building at 15 Beacon Street in Boston, Massachusetts. It served as the headquarters of the Boston Transit Commission, the nation's first public transportation agency, which was responsible for the initial creation of Boston's subway system, now operated by the commission's successor, the Massachusetts Bay Transportation Authority (MBTA).

== History ==
The ten-story Beaux Arts or Classical Revival building was designed by William Gibbons Preston and built in 1903–04 on the site of the 1722-built mansion of merchant Edward Bromfield.

The commission occupied the building until it went out of existence in 1916. The city took the property in 1920 by eminent domain, and used it to house the Boston School Committee. The city sold the building in 1998, and it has been converted into XV Beacon, a 63-room luxury hotel which is a member of the Historic Hotels of America. The hotel features art works by Jules Olitski, Gilbert Stuart, Maggi Brown, Martha Lloyd, Joe Greene, Tony Evanko, Ben Freeman, and others.

In 1965 the building was the site of a 114-day protest by Reverend Vernon E. Carter, who began living on the sidewalk outside the building to protest against continued de facto segregation in Boston's public schools after the Boston School Committee voted against taking action on April 26. Carter's "Freedom Vigil" ended on August 18 with the passing of the 1965 Racial Imbalance Act.

The building was listed on the National Register of Historic Places in 2007.

== See also ==
- Boston Transit Building (360 Newbury Street)
- National Register of Historic Places listings in northern Boston, Massachusetts
