= Ernest Courtenay Carter =

British Anglican priest (1858–1912)

Reverend Ernest Courtenay Carter (17 February 1858 – 15 April 1912) was an Anglican minister and one of the passengers who perished in the sinking of the RMS Titanic. He was born on 17 February 1858 in Compton, Berkshire, England.

== Titanic ==
Carter and his wife boarded the Titanic in Southampton as second-class passengers (ticket number 244252, costing £26). During the journey, he was bothered by a cold, and Marion Wright, whom the couple had befriended, found a remedy that helped him.

On the evening of 14 April Carter conducted an Evensong Hymn Service for about 100 passengers in the second-class dining saloon, preceding each hymn with a story about the hymn and its author. Robert Douglas Norman played the piano, and Marion Wright sang a solo of "Lead Kindly Light." Among the other hymns sung were "Eternal Father, Strong to Save" (also known as "For Those in Peril on the Sea"), "On the Resurrection Morning," "There is a Green Hill Far Away" (for which Marion Wright sang another solo), and the final hymn was "Now the Day is Over."

Around 10 p.m., a steward began preparing coffee and drinks, and Reverend Carter concluded the process by thanking the commissioner for the use of the salon and added that the ship was strangely stable, and everyone was eager for their arrival in New York. "Indeed," he said, "it is the first time hymns have been sung on this boat on a Sunday night, but we trust and pray that it will not be the last."

On the night of the sinking, it is believed that the Carters went up to the deck of the boat during the evacuation and secured a spot together in a lifeboat. He chose to stay behind, probably so someone else would be saved, and Mrs. Carter refused to leave her husband. Both perished in the sinking, and if their bodies were recovered, they were never identified. A brass memorial plaque dedicated to the couple was later unveiled at St. Jude's Church, Whitechapel.

Carter House a London County Council housing block completed in 1928 located on Brune Street opposite the Jewish Soup Kitchen is named after Reverend Carter. In LCC minutes stored at the Metropolitan Archive it is recorded the original name of the block was to be Booth House but on the building plans this name is struck off and Carter House is handwritten.
