= Małuszów, Jawor County =

Małuszów
- Village
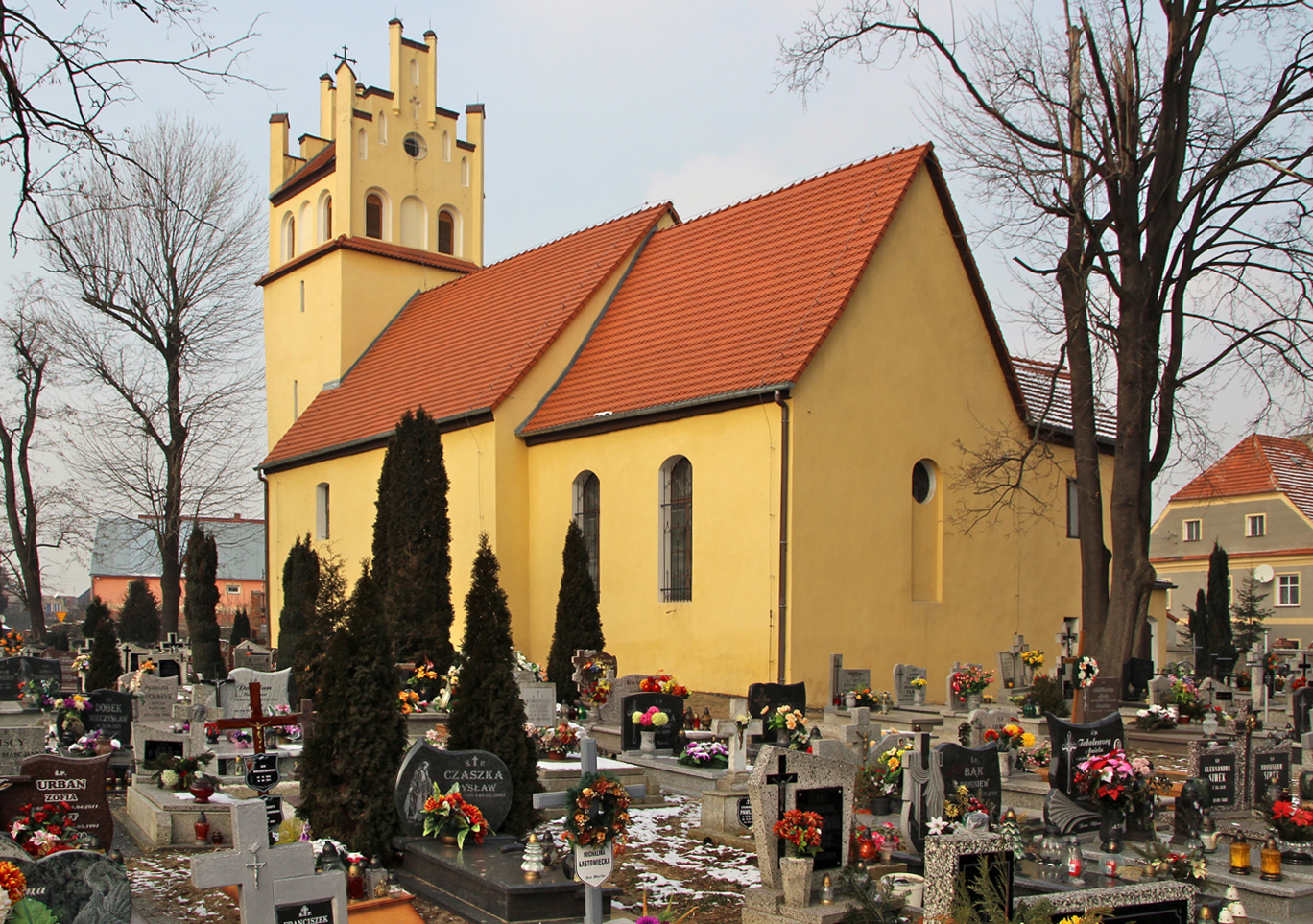
- Church of the Nativity of the Virgin Mary in Małuszów

- Location within Poland
- Coordinates: 51°6′57″N 16°10′31″E
- Country: Poland
- Voivodeship: Lower Silesian
- Powiat: Jawor
- Gmina: Męcinka
- Time zone: UTC+1 (CET)
  - Summer (DST): UTC+2 (CEST)
- Vehicle registration: DJA

Małuszów [maˈwuʂuf] is a village in the administrative district of Gmina Męcinka, within Jawor County, Lower Silesian Voivodeship, in south-western Poland.
