= Kondratów =

- Village
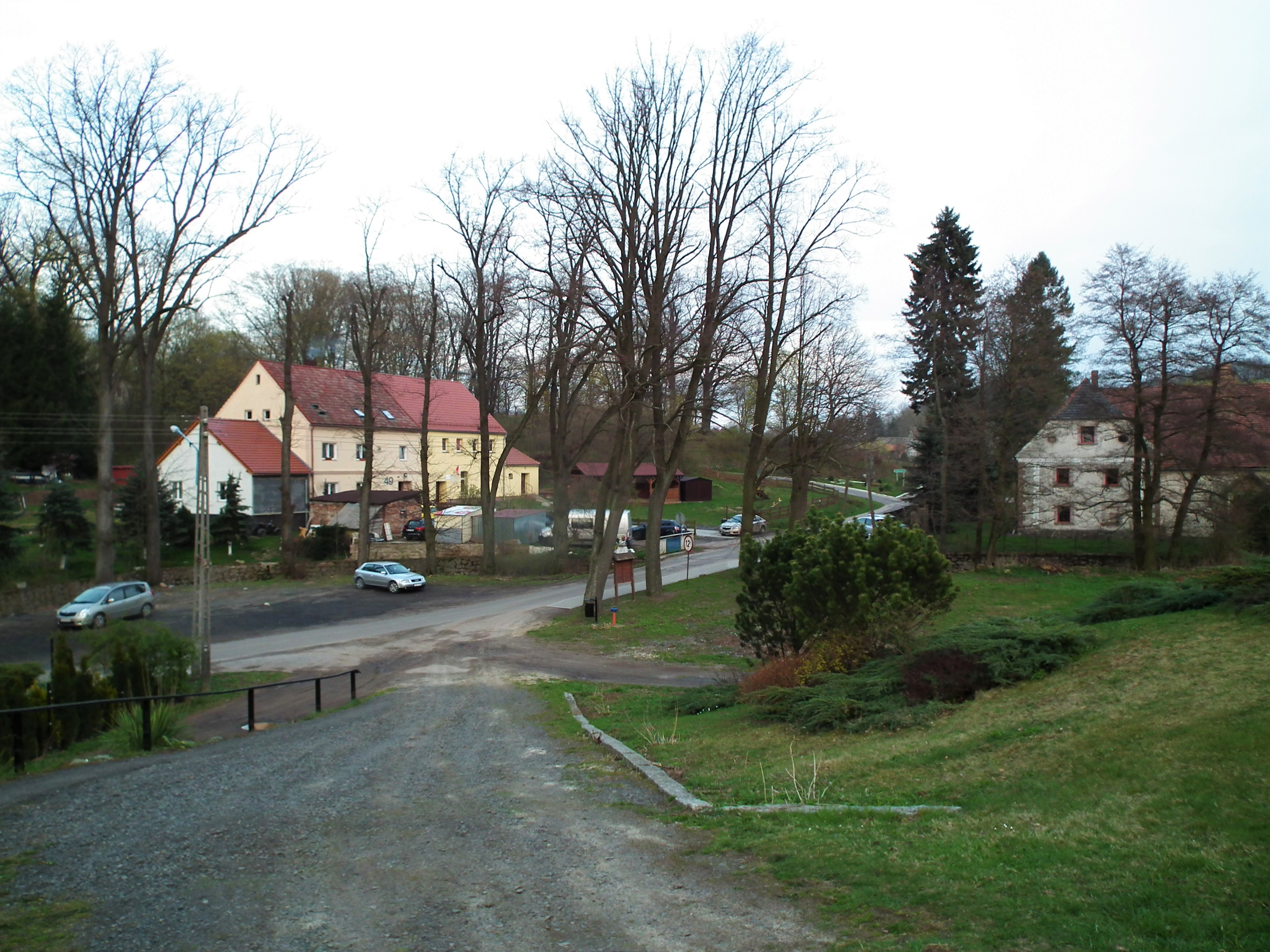

- Location within Poland
- Coordinates: 51°02′55″N 15°58′11″E
- Country: Poland
- Voivodeship: Lower Silesian
- Powiat: Jawor
- Gmina: Męcinka
- Earliest record: 1268
- Time zone: UTC+1 (CET)
  - Summer (DST): UTC+2 (CEST)
- Vehicle registration: DJA

Kondratów [kɔnˈdratuf] is a village in the administrative district of Gmina Męcinka, within Jawor County, Lower Silesian Voivodeship, in south-western Poland. Kondratów was formally established in 1311.

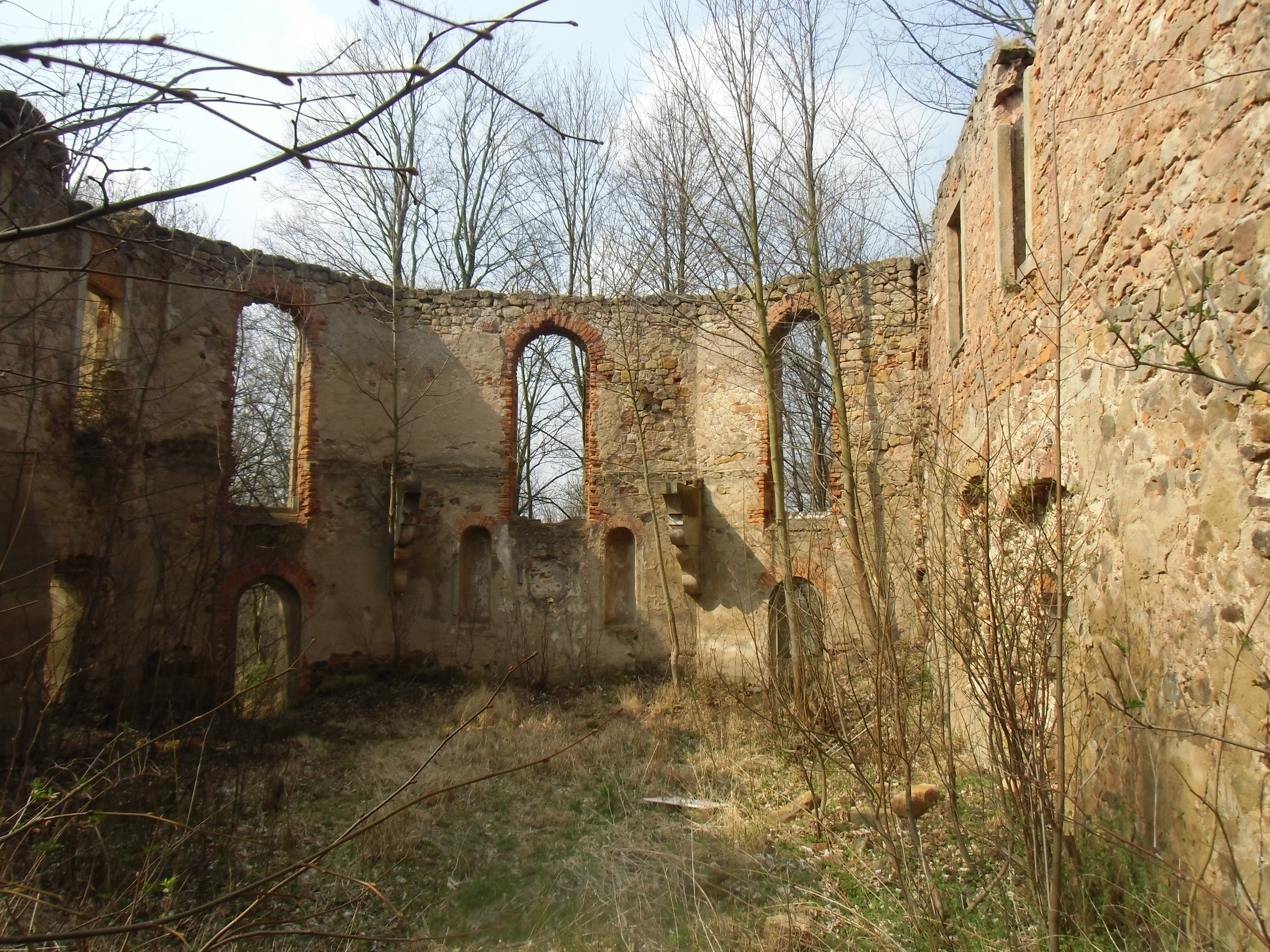
Ruins of Kondratów Castle
