= Ernest Vernon Carter =

American politician

Member of the South Carolina House of Representatives
- In office 1967–???

Personal details
- Born: July 27, 1925 DeLand, Florida, U.S.
- Died: October 16, 2010 (aged 85) Hamlet, North Carolina, U.S.
- Spouse: Thelestine Jones

Ernest Vernon Carter (July 27, 1925 – October 16, 2010) was an American politician. He served as a member of the South Carolina House of Representatives.

== Life and career ==
Carter was born in DeLand, Florida. He served in the United States Army during World War II.

In 1967, Carter was elected to the South Carolina House of Representatives, representing Williamsburg County, South Carolina.

Carter died in October 2010 at his son's home in Hamlet, North Carolina, at the age of 85.
