= Vernon E. Carter =

American civil rights activist and Lutheran minister (1919-2007)

The Reverend Vernon E. Carter
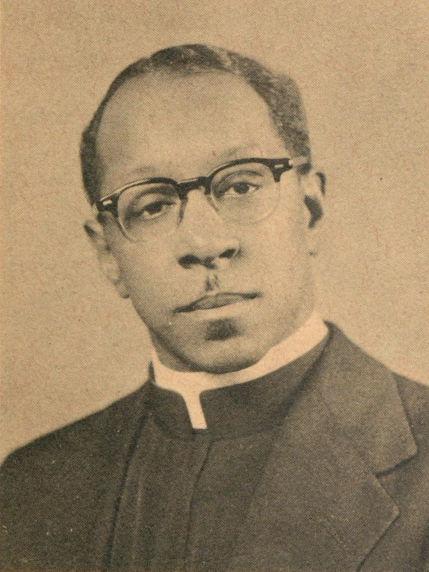
- Born: August 3, 1919; New Bedford, Massachusetts, U.S.
- Died: August 21, 2007 (aged 88); Williston, Vermont, U.S.
- Education: Wilberforce University (BA); Drew Theological Seminary; Boston University (STB)
- Occupation: Lutheran minister
- Known for: Holding a protest vigil outside the Boston School Committee for over 100 days in 1965
- Movement: Civil rights
- Spouse: Arlene Mae Anderson (m. 1943, divorced)
- Children: 2

Vernon Ernest Carter (August 3, 1919 - August 21, 2007) was an American Lutheran minister and civil rights activist. He is best known for his 114-day protest against de facto segregation in Boston's public schools, during which he spent 108 days living on the sidewalk outside the Boston School Committee Headquarters, which ultimately resulted in the passing of the 1965 Racial Imbalance Act and the beginning of desegregation busing in Massachusetts.

== Early life and education ==
Vernon Ernest Carter was born in New Bedford, Massachusetts on August 3, 1919 to Ernestine and James Carter. His maternal grandparents were of mixed African-American and Native American heritage. His maternal grandfather was Isaac D. Maddox whose ancestors were from Cambridgeport, Massachusetts and a veteran of the US Civil War serving in the 55th Massachusetts Regiment Company G. He was of both Black and Wampanoag heritage, and his maternal grandmother Joanna Davis was of Blackfoot heritage.Carter's great great uncle, Miles Carter, served in the 55th Massachusetts Black Cavalry from 1863-1865.

Carter experienced a spiritual awakening at the age of 15 during a revival service in his hometown of New Bedford, after which he began preaching, long before he was ordained. His mother supported her children by working as a cleaner at the home of a wealthy family and at a local YWCA. Vernon's father had abandoned his family.

Carter graduated from New Bedford High School in 1938, and later graduated in 1942 from Wilberforce University in Ohio with continuing studies at Drew Theological Seminary in Madison, New Jersey. He was ordained in the African Methodist Episcopal Church in 1942, and returned to New Bedford in 1947 to become pastor of the Bethel AME Church, which he served until 1949 when he was transferred to the Bethel AME church in Greenwich, Connecticut. In 1948 he earned a Bachelor of Sacred Theology degree from Boston University. Upon leaving the African Methodist Episcopal denomination, Carter attended the Lutheran Seminary in Philadelphia and Andover- Newton Theological Seminary for a year in preparation to serve in the Lutheran denomination.

In 1970 Carter became a Merrill Fellow at Harvard Divinity School and subsequently a financial aid counselor to Black seminarians. He taught classes in theology and philosophy at HDS, later becoming an assistant professor at Salem State University teaching philosophy, Black studies, and related subjects.

In 1956, Carter became pastor of the All Saints Lutheran Church, located at 85 West Newton Street in the South End of Boston, Massachusetts, which he served until 1979. During his time at HDS and pastoring All Saints he founded the School of Universal Blackness - an afterschool tutorial enrichment program for elementary and secondary students in Boston.

The All Saints Lutheran Church was later converted into the Villa Victoria Center for the Arts, and a community center used by Inquilinos Boricuas en Acción before being demolished in 2020/21 due to structural issues.

== Civil rights movement ==
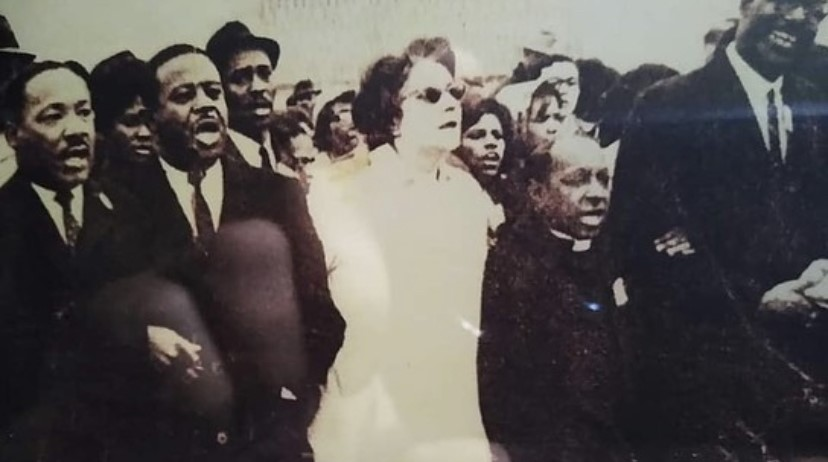
Vernon Carter (second from right) marching alongside Martin Luther King (first on left) in Boston, April 1965

Carter was involved in civil rights activism long before the movement of the 1960s. In August 1942, Carter was heading a campaign consisting of both Black and White citizens against employment discrimination, securing a promise from the General Electric Company in West Lynn, Massachusetts that Black women would be hired upon passing required tests. The acting mayor, Arthur J. Frawley, expressed his support for the group and declared that "prejudices should be banished by all persons, that we may go forward as a strong, united nation".

Carter was a follower of Martin Luther King's philosophy of non-violence and considered King his idol, keeping a picture of him on his desk inside the All Saints Church.

In 1963, Carter spoke to demonstrators at a protest against inaction by the Justice Department after the 16th Street Baptist Church bombing, a terrorist attack carried out by the Ku Klux Klan in Birmingham, Alabama which killed 4 Black children. Speaking to picketers outside the federal building on the day after the bombing, Carter stressed the need for active participation by the federal government.

Carter participated in the Boston school boycott of 1964, which had been declared illegal by attorney general Edward W. Brooke. Carter said that if truant officers tried to enter a "freedom school" held at his church, "they would have to move me physically". The boycott was supported by the Massachusetts Civil Liberties Union, who argued that "there is no valid legal or constitutional objection to a peaceful school stay out". Other participants in the boycott included basketball player Bill Russell and comedian Dick Gregory, who had taken part in civil rights demonstrations across the country, as well as other church ministers including Virgil Wood and James Breeden.

=== Freedom Vigil ===
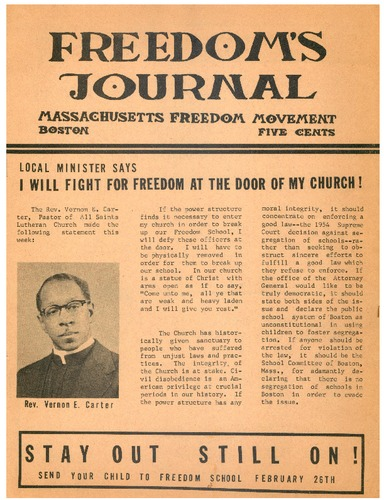
Flyer advertising Carter's "Freedom Vigil" in 1965. Freedom's Journal was the name of the first African-American newspaper in the United States, published between 1827 and 1829.

In the summer of 1965, Vernon Carter held a vigil on the sidewalk outside of Boston's School Committee Headquarters at 15 Beacon Street, in a protest against continued de facto segregation in Boston's public schools. Carter vowed to remain on the sidewalk until the Boston School Committee agreed to meet with Black leaders and parents to discuss the racial imbalance in schools. The protest began after the Boston School Committee voted 3 to 2 - without a hearing - to reject grievances brought to them by the NAACP regarding racial imbalance in Boston's public schools. Carter's "Freedom Vigil" began two days later on April 28, 1965.

Initial reactions from the police and passers-by were mostly negative, but gradually became less hostile as the vigil progressed. At one point during the vigil he was accosted by Jozef Mlot-Mroz, a prolific anti-communist activist and opponent of racial integration, who was fined $25 for assaulting Carter.

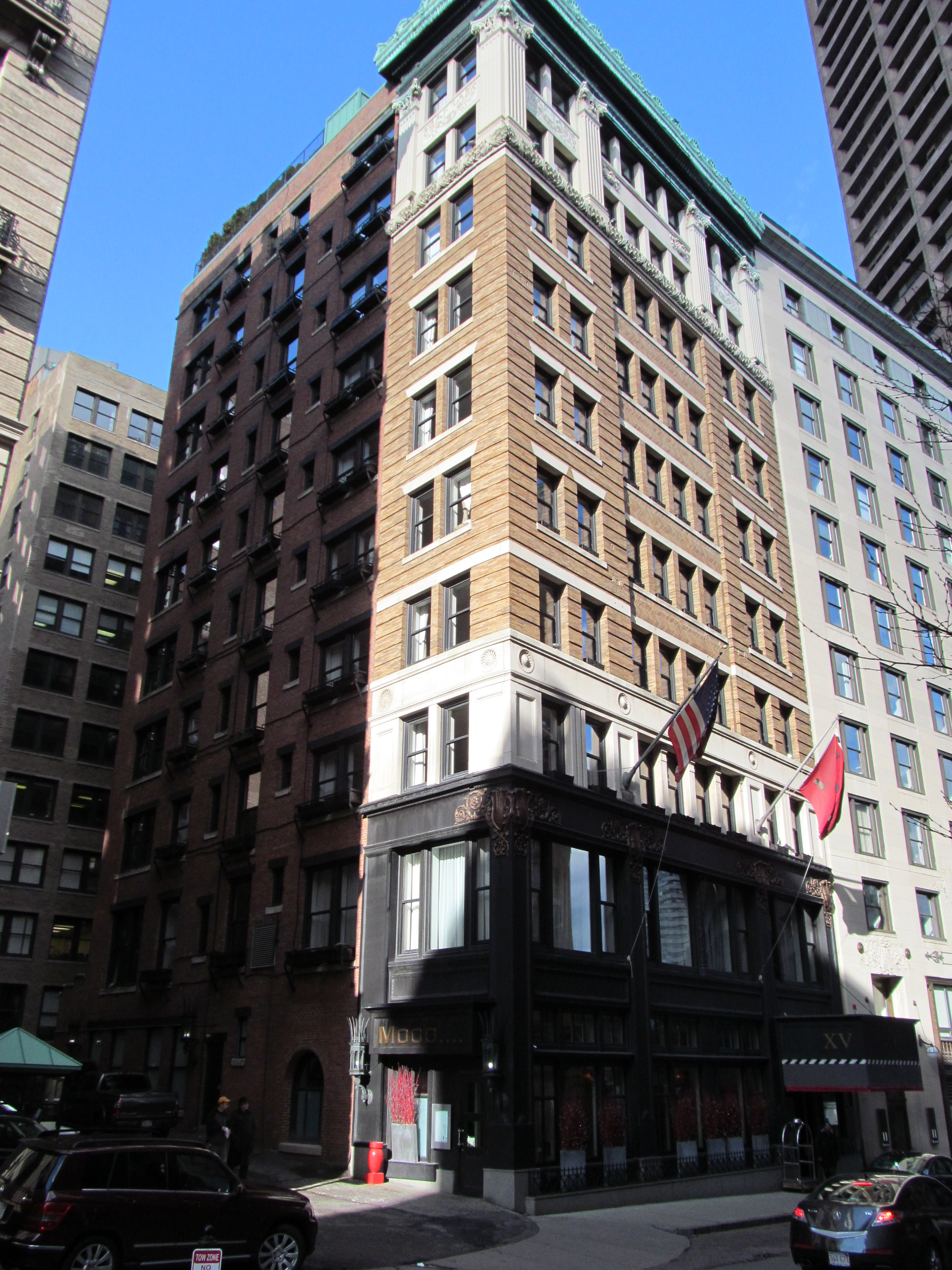
15 Beacon Street, which housed the Boston School Committee, was the site of Carter's "Freedom Vigil" (pictured in 2012)

Shortly after the vigil began, a van was donated by a local chapter of the NAACP to provide Carter with a place to sleep while remaining outside the School Committee Headquarters. He had access to a shower at a Paulist chapel located nearby, and shaved inside the School Committee building. Supporters brought him food including sandwiches and coffee, and in the evenings his dinner tab at the Parker House Hotel was paid for by a Jewish philanthropist. He would spend up to 21 hours a day walking, sleeping only 3 to 4 hours a night, circling the pavement in front of the Committee building, carrying a hand-painted sign over his shoulders, sometimes alone and sometimes accompanied by hundreds of others. Carter's protest vigil led Phyllis M. Ryan, who was acting as Carter's press secretary, to refer to him as "the pastor who lives on the sidewalk" after the first week of his protest.

In May, Carter and other participants in the Freedom Vigil held a moment of silence, followed by the singing of "We Shall Overcome", in memory of Rev. James Reeb who had been murdered by white supremacists while participating in the Selma to Montgomery marches in Selma, Alabama.

In early June, Martin Luther King Jr. sent a message of support to Carter, telling him that "Your vigil in behalf of truth shines forth from Beacon Street into the dark ghettos of American life encouraging thousands of your brothers" and that "Your sacrifice may well be the wedge which crumbles the wall of de facto segregation in Boston Schools". 42 days into the vigil, Carter was hospitalized for chest pains, but returned to the picket line immediately after being released from hospital.

In July, Carter told the Christian Science Monitor "I simply did this as an American citizen and as a parent, and I also did this as a Christian who believed that the minds of people, or the hearts of people, must be changed in order to effect a solution for this problem." In August he spoke to the Boston Herald, and said "It doesn't take large numbers of men to do big things. There were 12 disciples. One man can save a city. I didn't have any idea this would last 100 days, but I knew that men can't call time on God's will, and I told my wife that if I put on a sign and began walking, I'd go all the way." Carter had vowed to continue the vigil through the winter, telling a reporter "if that's what it takes, that's what I'm going to do".

Carter's vigil ended on August 18, 1965, 114 days after the initial school committee vote which had prompted the start of the protest, when Massachusetts governor John A. Volpe signed the Racial Imbalance Act into law. This law mandated desegregation measures in schools with at least 50% of students from minority backgrounds, and Carter was given the pen that Governor Volpe used to sign the bill into law. Excluding the initial two days before the start of his vigil and his brief hospitalization in June, Carter had spent a total of 108 days living on the sidewalk outside the school committee building, and upon ending the vigil he was immediately hospitalized for exhaustion and exposure. Former Massachusetts Secretary of Education Paul Parks later said that Carter had "played a significant role" and that "his camping out beside the School Committee building and parading out there 24 hours a day led to the passage of the bill". In 1985, 20 years after his freedom vigil, Carter was awarded a citation by the Boston School Committee for his efforts to desegregate schools. Over his 50 years of work and ministry he would receive awards and recognitions from the NAACP, the Crispus Attucks Champion Award, Peoples Baptist Church Men's Club, National Conference of Christians and Jews, Kiwanis Club of Boston, Black Ecumenical Commission, Boston Branch of Southern Leadership Christian Conference, Lambda Kappa Mu sorority, Roxbury Action Program, among others.

== Later activism ==
In response to rioting in June 1967 which affected the Roxbury area of Boston, Carter urged residents of the inner city and suburbs to join him in a "peace vigil" to "make our communities a safe haven of healthy citizenship".

In 1975, Carter spoke at the Student Conference Against Racism at Boston University, where he depicted the city of Boston as a "hunched over, drooling Neanderthal", declaring that "This city isn't going anywhere until Caucasians cease pseudo-scientifically classifying Blacks into inferior categories".

In 1979 Carter became director of the Evangelical Lutheran Church of America Advocacy for Community Change, headquartered at the historic Tremont Temple building, working closely with politicians such as former mayor White of Boston, Senator Ed Kennedy, Representative Royal Bolling, Gov. Michael Dukakis, Congresswoman Shirley Chisolm, and many others.

During Nelson Mandela's visit to Boston in 1990, 22 church bells, including Old North Church, sounded at 11am to mark his visit, as a result of a campaign by Vernon Carter to welcome the South African activist to the city. This was also accompanied by a police-escorted march and motorcade promoting Carter's personal manifesto, The Third and Final Emancipation (copyright 1997 by Vernon E. Carter).

In 1992 Carter traveled to a remote village in El Salvador with a delegation sponsored by the Cambride-El Salvador Sister City Project. He was detained at the airport and deported back to Florida. While his team waited he contacted Senator Ed Kennedy's office and Senator John Kerry who advocated for him. Within 48 hours he was allowed to enter the country reunited with his team.

Carter also worked with Ethiopian refugees, as well as others who like himself were of Black and Native American ancestry. He helped to establish "Heritage Circle", a program which educated Black people of part Native American ancestry to establish their heritage. Heritage Circle was known for its PowWows held in Franklin Park and naming ceremonies. The Praying Indians of Natick drummers often provided music for the events.

== Personal life and death ==
Vernon Carter was a man of short stature, standing at approximately 5ft (1.52 m) tall. He was known as "Little Arrow" to his family and those in the Native American community.

Vernon Carter married Arlene Mae Anderson in 1943, having met her while preaching at his first pastorate in Lynn, Massachusetts, and they were married for 22 years before separating. The couple reconciled in the final months of Vernon's life.

Vernon Carter died from cancer on August 21, 2007 at the age of 88 in Williston, Vermont. His funeral was held in Bethel AME Church in New Bedford, Massachusetts. He was survived by his 2 daughters, 7 grandchildren and 4 great-grandchildren, and predeceased by his brother Earle M. Carter Sr. His former wife Arlene Mae Carter died on August 10, 2024 at the age of 97. Vernon and Arlene Carter are memorialized as "Heroes of Boston" in the 1965 Freedom Plaza surrounding The Embrace, a sculpture on Boston Common.
