= 227th Division =

227th Division may refer to:

- 227th Infantry Division (Wehrmacht), Germany
- 227th Coastal Division, Italy
- 227th Rifle Division, Soviet Union

== See also ==
- List of military divisions by number
- 227th Brigade (disambiguation)
