= SS Petrella =

Coordinates: 35°32′N 24°18′E

History

France
- Name: Pasteur (1923–1928); Aveyron (1928–1941)
- Owner: Plisson et Cie de Bayonne (1923–1924); Compagnie des Chargeurs Français (1924–1928); Compagnie Générale d'Armement Maritime (1928–1939); Compagnie Générale Transatlantique (1939–1941)
- Builder: Ateliers et Chantiers de la Gironde, Graville, Le Havre
- Launched: 3 February 1923
- In service: 10 August 1923
- Identification: Official number: 5606113
- Fate: Transferred to Italy, 10 July 1941

Italy
- Name: Capo Pino
- Owner: Government of Italy
- Operator: Cia Genovese di Navigazione à Vapore SA, Genoa
- Acquired: 10 July 1941
- Fate: Captured by Germany, 8 September 1943

Germany
- Name: Petrella
- Owner: Mittelmeer-Reederei GmbH
- Acquired: 8 September 1943
- Fate: Sunk, 8 February 1944

General characteristics
- Type: Cargo liner
- Tonnage: 4,785 GRT; 6,500 DWT
- Length: 110.6 m (362 ft 10 in) o/a
- Beam: 14.98 m (49 ft 2 in)
- Propulsion: 1 × 2,500 hp (1,864 kW) 3-cylinder inverted triple expansion steam engine, 1 shaft
- Speed: 12 knots (22 km/h; 14 mph)

SS Petrella was a German merchant ship, which was torpedoed and sunk on 8 February 1944, north of Souda Bay, Crete, killing some 2,670 of the Italian prisoners of war aboard.

== Service history ==
The ship was built under the name Pasteur as a cargo liner, one of a class of nine ships ordered by the French government to replenish its merchant fleet after the losses of World War I. The ship was launched on 3 February 1923 from the Ateliers et Chantiers de la Gironde shipyard at Graville, Le Havre. On 11 July she was sold to the Plisson et Cie company of Bayonne, entering service on 10 August 1923. The following year she was sold to the Cie des Chargeurs Français, and in 1925 was chartered to the Compagnie Navale de l'Océanie shipping line, a subsidiary of the Ballande & Fils group, for service to New Caledonia. In June 1928 the ship was bought by the Compagnie Générale d'Armement Maritime (CGAM) and renamed Aveyron. She was operated by the Compagnie Générale Transatlantique (CGT) company, and was finally transferred to the ownership of CGT in 1939.

On 10 July 1941, following the French armistice the ship was transferred to the ownership of the Italian Government, and renamed Capo Pino was operated by the Cia Genovese di Navigazione à Vapore, based at Genoa.

The ship was captured by the Germans at Patras, Greece, on 8 September 1943, following the announcement of the Italian capitulation. She was renamed Petrella and operated under the ownership of the Mittelmeer-Reederei GmbH of Hamburg, a state-owned company that managed captured ships in the Mediterranean on behalf of the German Wehrmacht, with civilian crews under military jurisdiction.

=== Sinking ===
Crete had been captured by the Germans in mid-1941, and was occupied by German and Italians force as "Fortress Crete". The Italian 51st Infantry Division Siena consisted of some 21,700 men, and occupied the easternmost prefecture of Lasithi. Following the armistice of September 1943, Italian forces in Crete were disarmed by the Germans without major problems. As elsewhere, they were given the choice to continue to fight alongside German forces or to be sent to Germany as military internees to perform forced labour. A minority chose to continue the fight and formed the Legione Italiana Volontari Creta.

In early 1944, 3,173 prisoners were loaded into the holds of Petrella, which had the letters "P. O. W." painted in white on her sides. On 8 February, she left Souda for Piraeus. After the ship left Souda Bay, she was spotted by the British submarine HMS Sportsman, which fired four torpedoes from approximately 2,700 metres at around 8:30 am. Petrella was struck by two of the torpedoes amidships and split in two before sinking; the ship's bow was the last part to sink. Many Italian prisoners attempted to reach the deck of the sinking ship, though the German guards onboard kept the holds locked and attacked Italians trying to escape with rifles, machine guns, hand grenades and buttstrokes; approximately 2,670 prisoners died in the sinking.

== See also ==
- MS Sinfra
- SS Oria
- Sinking of the SS Tanais
- List by death toll of ships sunk by submarines
