= 40th Infantry Regiment "Bologna" =

Inactive Italian Army infantry unit

- 40° Reggimento Fanteria "Bologna"
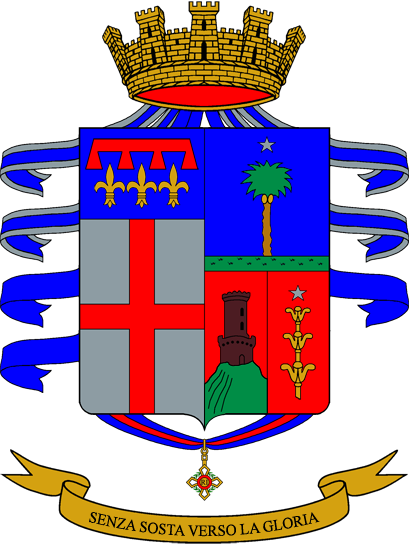
- Regimental coat of arms
- Active: 12 June 1859 – 8 Dec. 1942; 1 April 1947 – 31 May 1991
- Country: Italy
- Branch: Italian Army
- Part of: Mechanized Brigade "Trieste"
- Garrison/HQ: Bologna
- Motto: "Senza sosta verso la gloria"
- Anniversaries: 25 June 1915 – Battle of Castelnuovo del Carso
- Decorations: 1× Military Order of Italy; 4× Silver Medals of Military Valor; 3× Bronze Medals of Military Valor

Insignia
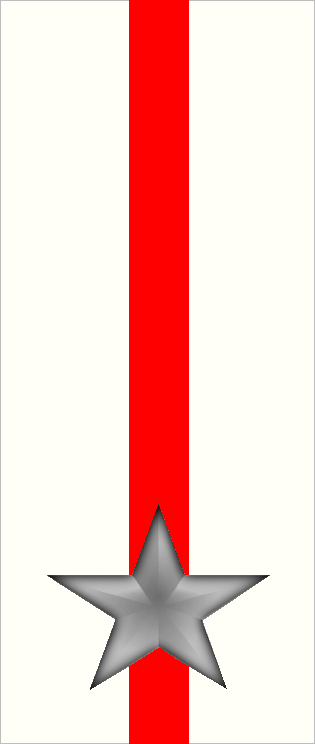
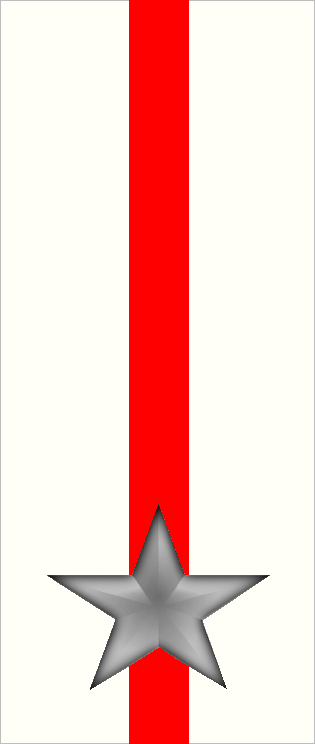
- Regimental gorget patches

The 40th Infantry Regiment "Bologna" (Italian: 40° Reggimento Fanteria "Bologna") is an inactive unit of the Italian Army last based in Bologna. The regiment is named for the city of Bologna and part of the Italian Army's infantry arm. On 12 June 1859, a volunteer brigade was formed in Turin, which occupied Bologna during the Second Italian War of Independence. In Bologna the brigade formed two regiments and on 1 October 1859, the brigade was renamed Brigade "Bologna". On 1 January 1860, the two regiments were renumbered 39th Infantry Regiment and 40th Infantry Regiment, and on 25 March 1860, the regiments joined the Royal Sardinian Army.

In 1860, the 40th Infantry Regiment participated in the Sardinian campaign in central and southern Italy. In 1866, the regiment participated in the Third Italian War of Independence and in 1870 in the capture of Rome. In 1911–12 the regiment fought in the Italo-Turkish War. In World War I the regiment fought on the Italian front. During World War II, the regiment was assigned to the 25th Infantry Division "Bologna", with which it fought in the Western Desert campaign, during which the regiment was destroyed in the Second Battle of El Alamein.

In 1947, the regiment was reformed in Modena and in 1950, assigned to the Infantry Division "Trieste", which was reduced to Infantry Brigade "Trieste" in 1960. In 1975, the regiment was disbanded and its flag and traditions assigned to the 40th Mechanized Infantry Battalion "Bologna". The battalion was assigned to the Mechanized Brigade "Trieste". In 1989, the battalion was reduced to a reserve unit and the flag of the 40th Infantry Regiment "Bologna" transferred to the Shrine of the Flags in the Vittoriano in Rome. In 1991, the battalion was officially disbanded. The regiment's anniversary falls on 25 June 1915, the day the regiment pushed Austro-Hungarian forces out of Castelnuovo del Carso during the First Battle of the Isonzo, for which the regiment was awarded a Silver Medal of Military Valor.

== History ==
=== Formation ===
On 21 July 1858, French Emperor Napoleon III and the Prime Minister of Sardinia Camillo Benso, Count of Cavour met in Plombières and reached a secret verbal agreement on a military alliance between the Second French Empire and the Kingdom of Sardinia against the Austrian Empire. On 26 January 1859, Napoleon III signed the Franco-Sardinian Treaty, followed by King Victor Emmanuel II on 29 January 1859. On 9 March 1859, Sardinia mobilized its army, followed by Austria on 9 April. On 23 April, Austria delivered an ultimatum to Sardinia demanding its demobilization. Upon Sardinia's refusal, Austria declared war on 26 April and three days later the Austrians crossed the Ticino river into Piedmont. Consequently, France honored its alliance with Sardinia and declared war on Austria on 3 May 1859.

On 12 June 1859, the Royal Sardinian Army formed the Brigade Victor Emmanuel (Italian: Brigata Vittorio Emanuele) in Turin, with volunteers that had come to Piedmont from Veneto and the Papal Legations of the Romagne. The unfinished brigade was sent to Bologna to occupy the city after Austrians troops had left the city after the Austrian defeat in the Battle of Magenta. In Bologna the brigade formed the 21st Infantry Regiment, which soon ceded its III Battalion to help form the 22nd Infantry Regiment. On 1 October 1859, the Brigade Victor Emmanuel was renamed Brigade "Bologna". On 30 November 1859, the Duchy of Parma and Piacenza, Duchy of Modena and Reggio, and the Papal Legations of the Romagne were united under the Royal Government of Emilia, which on 1 January 1860 was redesignated as the Royal Provinces of Emilia. On the same date, the 21st and 22nd infantry regiments took their place in the progressive numerical order of the regiments of the Royal Sardinian Army and became the 39th Infantry Regiment (Brigade "Bologna") and 40th Infantry Regiment (Brigade "Bologna"). On 11 and 12 March 1860, the Royal Provinces of Emilia voted in a plebiscite for annexation by the Kingdom of Sardinia. On 18 March 1860, the annexation act was presented to Victor Emmanuel II and one week later, on 25 March 1860, the Brigade "Bologna" and its two regiments were formally incorporated into the Royal Sardinian Army.

=== Expedition of the Thousand ===
On 5 May 1860, Giuseppe Garibaldi's Expedition of the Thousand set off from Genoa and landed on 11 May in Marsala in Sicily. On 15 May 1860, Garibaldi won the Battle of Calatafimi and on 21 June his troops occupied Palermo. On 19 August 1860, Garibaldi's troops landed in Calabria and began his campaign to occupy Southern Italy. On 11 September 1860, the Royal Sardinia Army crossed the border of the Papal State and began the Sardinian campaign in central and southern Italy. On 14 September 1860, the Brigade "Bologna" participated in the capture of Perugia. From 24 to 29 September the brigade fought in the Siege of Ancona, during which the brigade's two regiments stormed on 26 September the heights of Monte Pulito and Monte Pelago near the Altavilla Fort. For taking the two heights, the two infantry regiments of the Brigade "Bologna" were both awarded a Silver Medal of Military Valor, while the 40th Infantry Regiment's 7th Company was awarded a Bronze Medal of Military Valor for its role in the events of that day. The two medals were affixed to the 40th Infantry Regiment's flag and added to the regiment's coat of arms.

After the successful conclusion of Garibaldi's Expedition of the Thousand the Kingdom of Sardinia annexed the Kingdom of the Two Sicilies. On 17 March 1861, King Victor Emmanuel II proclaimed himself King of Italy. In the following years, the Brigade "Bologna" was deployed to the Marsica and Sannio regions in Southern Italy to suppress the anti-Sardinian revolt, which had erupted in Southern Italy after the annexation of the Kingdom of the Two Sicilies.

On 1 August 1862, the 40th Infantry Regiment (Brigade "Bologna") ceded its 17th Company and 18th Company to help form the 67th Infantry Regiment (Brigade "Palermo"). In 1866, the Brigade "Bologna" participated in the Third Italian War of Independence. In September 1870, the brigade participated in the capture of Rome, during which the brigade fought in the storming of Civita Castellana on 13 September and the storming of Rome on 20 September. On 25 October 1871, the brigade level was abolished, and the two regiments of the Brigade "Bologna" were renamed 39th Infantry Regiment "Bologna", respectively 40th Infantry Regiment "Bologna". On 2 January 1881, the brigade level was reintroduced, and the two regiments were renamed again as 39th Infantry Regiment (Brigade "Bologna") and 40th Infantry Regiment (Brigade "Bologna").

On 1 November 1884, the 40th Infantry Regiment ceded some of its companies to help form the 90th Infantry Regiment (Brigade "Salerno"). In 1895–96, the regiment provided ten officers and 271 enlisted for units deployed to Italian Eritrea for the First Italo-Ethiopian War.

=== Italo-Turkish War ===
In 1911, the 40th Infantry Regiment was deployed to Libya for the Italo-Turkish War. On 4 December 1911, the regiment fought in the Battle of Ain Zara. On 8 June 1912, the regiment distinguished itself in the Battle of Zanzur and was awarded a Silver Medal of Military Valor, which was affixed to the regiment's flag and added to the regiment's coat of arms. On 8 July 1912, the regiment fought in the Battle of Misrata. In 1913, the regiment remained in Libya and fought against local rebels.

=== World War I ===
At the outbreak of World War I, the Brigade "Bologna" formed, together with the Brigade "Siena" and the 24th Field Artillery Regiment, the 19th Division. At the time the 40th Infantry Regiment consisted of three battalions, each of which fielded four fusilier companies and one machine gun section. On 1 March 1915, the depot of the 40th Infantry Regiment in Naples formed the command of the Brigade "Benevento" and the 134th Infantry Regiment for the new brigade. After Italy's entry into the war on 23 May 1915, the Brigade "Bologna" was deployed on the lower Isonzo river. On 11 June 1915, the brigade crossed the Isonzo at Pieris. On 23 June, Italian forces commenced the First Battle of the Isonzo and the Brigade "Bologna" attacked the Austro-Hungarian positions on the base of the Karst plateau, occupying first Fogliano and then pushing the Austrians out of Castelnuovo. On 18 July 1915, the brigade participated in the Second Battle of the Isonzo, during which the 40th Infantry Regiment attacked enemy positions in the Bosco Cappuccio woods below San Martino del Carso. On 18 October 1915, the brigade attacked, during the Third Battle of the Isonzo, towards Doberdò del Lago. On 14 December 1915, the brigade, which had suffered 1,960 casualties since the Third Battle of the Isonzo began, was taken out of the front and sent to the rear. For their conduct and bravery during the first year of the war, especially from 23 June to 31 July and from 21 to 23 October, the both regiments of the Brigade "Bologna" were awarded a Silver Medal of Military Valor. The medals were affixed to the regiments' flag and added to their coat of arms.

The brigade spent most of 1916 in the quiet Tonale Pass sector. In November 1916, the brigade was sent again to the Karst plateau. On 25 January 1917, the depot of the 40th Infantry Regiment in Naples formed the 242nd Infantry Regiment for the newly formed Brigade "Teramo". On 10 May 1917, the Tenth Battle of the Isonzo began and the brigade attacked towards Korita na Krasu and Hudi Log, the latter of the two the brigade managed to occupy for a short time. For the valor shown in the attack towards Hudi Log the brigade's two regiments were both awarded a Bronze Medal of Military Valor. The medals were affixed to the regiments' flag and added to their coat of arms. In August 1917, the brigade fought in the Eleventh Battle of the Isonzo.

During the first days of the Battle of Caporetto the brigade was in the rear. When the rapid Austro-Hungarian advance forced the Italians to retreat behind the Piave river, the brigade was tasked, on 29 October 1917, with defending the bridge over the Tagliamento river at Pinzano. On 1 November 1917, the brigade, which had lost more than 5,000 men in two days, crossed the Tagliamento river and the 800 survivors marched to the new Italian lines on the Piave river. In June 1918, during the Second Battle of the Piave River the brigade was deployed on the Montello, where it withstood a series of enemy attacks. During the decisive Battle of Vittorio Veneto the brigade was deployed on the Monte Grappa massif, where it attacked Austro-Hungarian positions on 24 October. After the enemy began to retreat the brigade advanced and liberated Feltre.

=== Interwar years ===
On 7 November 1926, the 39th Infantry Regiment was disbanded. On 14 November 1926, the Brigade "Bologna" was renamed XXV Infantry Brigade, while the 40th Infantry Regiment (Brigade "Bologna") was renamed 40th Infantry Regiment "Bologna". The XXV Infantry Brigade was the infantry component of the 25th Territorial Division of Naples, which also included the 10th Field Artillery Regiment. The XXV Infantry Brigade also received the 15th Infantry Regiment "Savona" from the disbanded Brigade "Savona" and the 31st Infantry Regiment "Siena" from the disbanded Brigade "Siena".

In 1934, the 25th Territorial Division of Naples changed its name to 25th Infantry Division "Volturno". A name change that also extended to the division's infantry brigade. On 1 October 1934, the 39th Infantry Regiment "Bologna" was reformed in Salerno as a training unit and assigned to the XXIII Infantry Brigade "Murge", which was the infantry component of the 23rd Infantry Division "Murge". In 1935–36 the 40th Infantry Regiment "Bologna" provided 36 officers and 435 troops to units deployed to East Africa for the Second Italo-Ethiopian War. On 27 April 1939, the 15th Infantry Regiment "Savona" was transferred to the newly formed 55th Infantry Division "Savona", while the 39th Infantry Regiment "Bologna" was transferred from the 23rd Infantry Division "Murge" to the 25th Infantry Division "Volturno". On the same day, the XXV Infantry Brigade "Volturno" was disbanded and its infantry regiments came under direct command of the division, which was renamed 25th Infantry Division "Bologna". On 8 September 1939, the "Bologna" division was sent to Tripolitania in Libya and on 15 September 1939, the 31st Infantry Regiment "Siena", which had remained in Italy, was transferred to the newly formed 51st Infantry Division "Siena".

=== World War II ===
At the outbreak of World War II, the 40th Infantry Regiment "Bologna" consisted of a command, a command company, three fusilier battalions, a support weapons battery equipped with 65/17 infantry support guns, and a mortar company equipped with 81mm Mod. 35 mortars. On 10 June 1940, Italy entered World War II by invading France. During the invasion of France the "Bologna" division was deployed along the French Tunisian-Libyan border. On 24 June 1940, the Franco-Italian Armistice was signed and the "Bologna" division returned to its garrison in Bir al-Ghanam.

==== Western Desert campaign ====
On 9 September 1940, the Italian 10th Army invaded Egypt. On 9 December 1940, the British Western Desert Force commended Operation Compass and within days annihilated entire Italian divisions. The "Bologna" division's 10th Artillery Regiment "Bologna" and some of the division's smaller units were sent to Cyrenaica to reinforce the new Italian frontline at Derna and Mechili. On 25–29 January 1941, the 10th Artillery Regiment "Bologna" fought in the defensive battle at Derna, but the Italian attempts to stop the British offensive failed and the remnants of the 10th Army were forced to resume their retreat. On 6–7 February 1941, the remnants of the 10th Army were encircled and destroyed in the Battle of Beda Fomm.

In March 1941, the "Bologna" division and elements of the 17th Infantry Division "Pavia" were sent to Sirte, where they were tasked to stop any further British advance. In April 1941, the newly formed 205th Artillery Regiment "Bologna" arrived in North Africa as replacement for the destroyed 10th Artillery Regiment "Bologna". In late May 1941, after the Axis' successful Operation Sonnenblume, the "Bologna" division advanced to Tobruk, where the division participated in the Siege of Tobruk. On 20 August 1941, the I Battalion of the 40th Infantry Regiment "Bologna" was deployed in the first line of the Tobruk siege ring. On 18 November 1941, the British Eighth Army launched Operation Crusader, with the aim to break the siege of Tobruk. On 21 November, the "Bologna" division repulsed an attack by the Tobruk garrison against the division's positions at Sidi Rezegh. On 23 November, the Tobruk garrison renewed their attack, but the 17th Infantry Division "Pavia" arrived and mounted a counterattack, which defeated the British assault. On 25 November, the "Bologna" division was attacked by the British relief force, which managed to break through the "Bologna" division's line and establish contact with the Tobruk garrison. The "Bologna" division, which was in danger of being encircled East of Tobruk, broke through British lines and moved to the airfield at Al ‘Adam (today the Gamal Abdul El Nasser Air Base). On 4 December 1941, the I Battalion of the 40th Infantry Regiment "Bologna" was overrun by British forces, and on 5 December 1941, the remnants of the "Bologna" division retreated to Gazala and then Derna, where the division arrived on 11 December. From there the division retreated to Ajdabiya and El Agheila.

For its bravery and sacrifice at Tobruk the I Battalion of the 40th Infantry Regiment "Bologna" was awarded a Bronze Medal of Military Valor, which was affixed to the flag of the 40th Infantry Regiment "Bologna" and added to the regiment's coat of arms.

During the first half of 1942 the "Bologna" division was deployed at Ajdabiya. After the Battle of Gazala and Battle of Mersa Matruh the division was ordered on 15 July 1942 to move to El Alamein in Egypt, where the First Battle of El Alamein was being fought. On 18 July, the division entered Egypt. On 30 August 1942, the "Bologna" division participated in the Battle of Alam el Halfa. On 23 October 1942, the Second Battle of El Alamein began. On 4 November 1942, the "Bologna" division and other Italian divisions tried to escape the allied breakthrough and advance to their North. The retreat failed and the "Bologna" division's units were overtaken, surrounded by British motorized units, and then annihilated one-by-one. Remnants of the "Bologna" division fought on 5 November 1942, in Ra’s al Ḩikmah, and on 6 November in Fukah and then in Mersa Matruh. On 8 December 1942, the "Bologna" division and its regiments were declared lost due to wartime events.

For its bravery and valor between November 1941 and October 1942 the 40th Infantry Regiment "Bologna" was awarded a Silver Medal of Military Valor, which was affixed to the flag of the regiment's flag and added to the regiment's coat of arms.

=== Cold War ===
On 1 April 1947, the 40th Infantry Regiment "Bologna" was reformed in Modena. The regiment consisted of a command, a command company, three fusilier battalions, and a mortar company. On 1 June 1950, the 40th Infantry Regiment "Bologna" was assigned to the newly formed Infantry Division "Trieste" in Bologna. The division consisted of the 40th Infantry Regiment "Bologna", 82nd Infantry Regiment "Torino", 21st Field Artillery Regiment, and for a short time also the 121st Field Artillery Regiment. During the same year the 40th Infantry Regiment "Bologna" moved from Modena to Bologna. On 15 July 1951, the 6th Armored Cavalry Regiment "Lancieri di Aosta" joined the Infantry Division "Trieste".

In October 1954, the Trieste United States Troops and British Element Trieste Force began to depart from the city of Trieste, which was scheduled to return to Italian control on 26 October 1954. On 15 October, in preparation for the handover, the Italian Army formed the Grouping "Trieste" in Udine. The grouping consisted of units drawn from the Infantry Division "Trieste": part of the division's command, the 82nd Infantry Regiment "Torino" and the I Group of the 21st Field Artillery Regiment. On 23 October the Infantry Division "Trieste" was officially disbanded. The 40th Infantry Regiment "Bologna" and the 21st Artillery Regiment were assigned to the newly formed Grouping "Bologna", while the 6th Armored Cavalry Regiment "Lancieri di Aosta" was transferred to the VI Territorial Military Command.

On 15 November 1955, the Grouping "Bologna" was renamed Infantry Division "Trieste". On 20 October 1960, the Infantry Division "Trieste" was again disbanded and its units assigned to the newly formed Infantry Brigade "Trieste". At the time the 40th Infantry Regiment "Bologna" consisted of the following units:

- 40th Infantry Regiment "Bologna", in Bologna
  - Command and Services Company, in Bologna
  - I Battalion, in Bologna
  - II Battalion, in Forlì
  - III Battalion, in Bologna
  - Anti-tank Company, in Bologna

On 20 June 1974, the regiment's III Battalion, which was tasked with training the brigade's recruits, was disbanded. On 1 June 1975, the III Battalion was reformed as an operational unit. During the 1975 army reform the army disbanded the regimental level and newly independent battalions were granted for the first time their own flags. On 30 September 1975, the 40th Infantry Regiment "Bologna" was disbanded. The next day the regiment's I Battalion became an autonomous unit and was renamed 40th Mechanized Infantry Battalion "Bologna". On the same date the regiment's II Battalion and III Battalion became autonomous units and were renamed 66th Mechanized Infantry Battalion "Valtellina" and 37th Mechanized Infantry Battalion "Ravenna". The three battalions were assigned to the Mechanized Brigade "Trieste" and each of them consisted of a command, a command and services company, three mechanized companies with M113 armored personnel carriers, and a heavy mortar company with M106 mortar carriers with 120mm Mod. 63 mortars. At the time each of the three battalions fielded 896 men (45 officers, 100 non-commissioned officers, and 751 soldiers).

On 12 November 1976, the President of the Italian Republic Giovanni Leone assigned with decree 846 the flag and traditions of the 40th Infantry Regiment "Bologna" to the 40th Mechanized Infantry Battalion "Bologna".

With the end of the Cold War the Italian Army began to draw down its forces. On 15 December 1989, the 40th Mechanized Infantry Battalion "Bologna" transferred the flag of the 40th Infantry Regiment "Bologna" to the Shrine of the Flags in the Vittoriano in Rome. The next day the 40th Mechanized Infantry Battalion "Bologna" was reduced to a reserve unit. On 31 May 1991, the 40th Mechanized Infantry Battalion "Bologna" was officially disbanded.
