= HMS Vivid (P77) =

Submarine of the Royal Navy

History

United Kingdom
- Name: HMS Vivid
- Builder: Vickers Armstrong, Walker-on-Tyne
- Laid down: 27 October 1942
- Launched: 15 September 1943
- Commissioned: 19 January 1944
- Identification: Pennant number P77
- Fate: Scrapped at Faslane, October 1950

General characteristics
- Class & type: V-class submarine
- Length: 204 ft 6 in (62.33 m)
- Beam: 15 ft 9 in (4.80 m)
- Depth: 15 ft 10 in (4.83 m)
- Speed: 11.5 kn (21.3 km/h) surfaced; 9 kn (17 km/h)
- Endurance: Surface: 4,050 nmi (7,500 km; 4,660 mi) at 10 kn (19 km/h; 12 mph) (design); Submerged: 23 nmi (43 km; 26 mi) at 8 kn (15 km/h; 9.2 mph) or 170 nmi (310 km; 200 mi) at 2.5 kn (4.6 km/h; 2.9 mph) (design)
- Test depth: 200 ft (61 m)
- Complement: 33
- Armament: 4 × 21 inch (533 mm) torpedo tube. 1 × 3 in gun, 3 × 0.303 in machine guns

HMS Vivid was a V-class submarine laid down in 1942 and launched in 1943 by Vickers Armstrong in Newcastle-upon-Tyne for the British Royal Navy. She was launched in September 1943 and, under the command of Lieutenant John Cromwell Varley DSC, served with the 10th Submarine Flotilla based at Malta during the closing stages of the Allied campaign in the Mediterranean sinking various German, Greek and Italian merchant ships off the coast of Greece.

During one of her sorties in 1944, Vivid sighted the requisitioned merchant ship SS Tanais 14 nautical miles (26 km; 16 mi) northwest of the islet of Dia on 9 June. Vivid fired a spread of four torpedoes at a range of 2,400 yards (2,200 m). Two hit Tanais, sinking her in just 12 seconds; between 425 and 1,000 people died in the sinking, including deported Cretan Jews and Italian prisoners of war.

Following a refit, HMS Vivid was transferred to the 2nd Submarine Flotilla in the Far East for one patrol in June 1945. The vessel was paid off into Reserve in 1946 and scrapped at Faslane, Gare Loch in October 1950.
