= SS Tanais =

Greek-owned cargo ship

History
- Name: Holywood (1907–1935); Tanais (1935–1944)
- Namesake: Tanais (1935–1944)
- Owner: Wm France, Fenwick & Co (1907–1935); Stefanos Synodinos (1935–1941); Mittelmeer-Reederei (1942–1944)
- Operator: Wm France, Fenwick & Co (1907–1935); Stefanos Synodinos (1935–1941); Mittelmeer-Reederei (1942–1944)
- Port of registry: (United Kingdom) London (1907–1935); (Greece) Piraeus (1935–1941); (Germany) Hamburg (1942–1944)
- Builder: John Blumer & Co, Sunderland
- Yard number: 193
- Launched: 14 December 1906
- Completed: January 1907
- Identification: UK official number 123769; code letters HJWG (until 1933); call sign GDCL (1934–1935); call sign SVAK (1935–1941)
- Fate: Torpedoed and sunk on 9 June 1944

General characteristics
- Type: Cargo ship
- Tonnage: 1,545 GRT 965 NRT
- Length: 244.4 ft (74.5 m)
- Beam: 38.0 ft (11.6 m)
- Draught: 16 ft 7 in (5.05 m)
- Depth: 15.8 ft (4.8 m)
- Decks: 1
- Installed power: 214 NHP
- Propulsion: 3-cylinder triple-expansion engine
- Speed: 10 knots (19 km/h; 12 mph)
- Crew: 12 + 14 anti-aircraft gunners

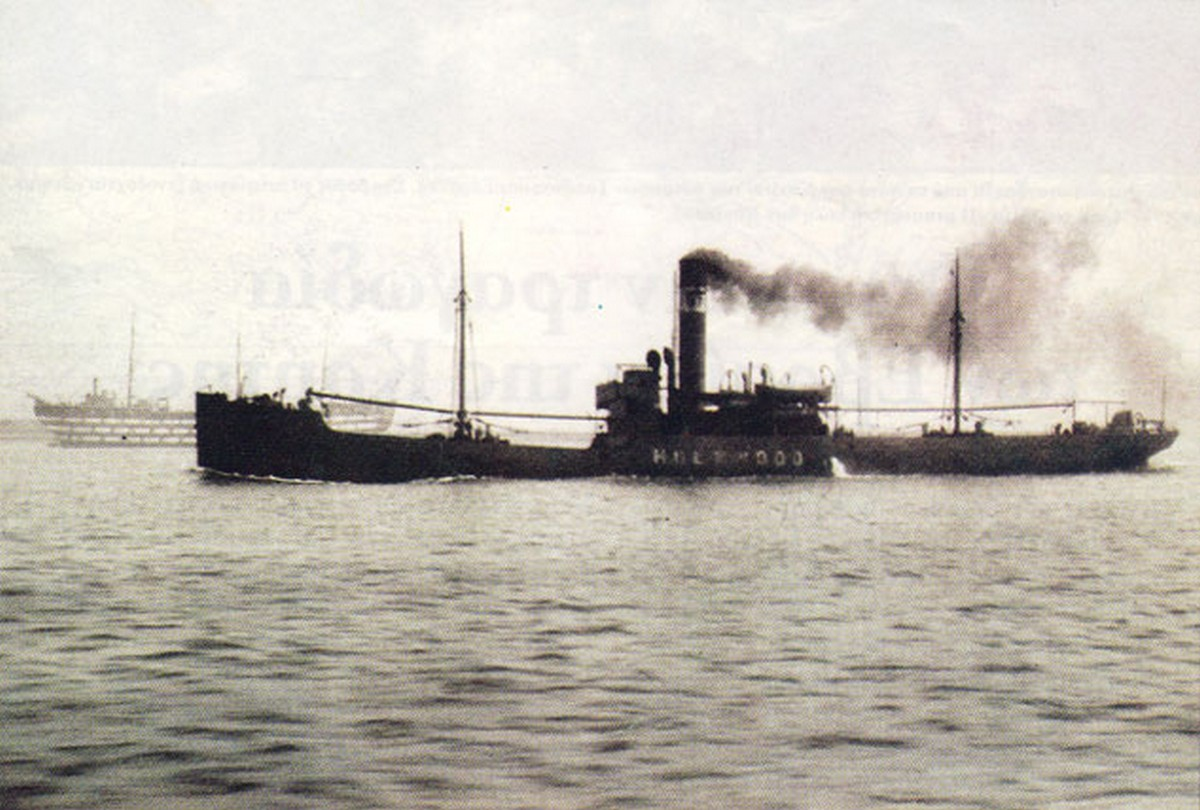
Undated photograph of the SS Tanis

SS Tanais (Greek: Τάναϊς), mistakenly referred to as Danae or Danais (Δανάη / Δαναΐς), was a British-built, Greek-owned cargo ship requisitioned by the German occupation forces in Greece in World War II. On 9 June 1944, Royal Navy submarine HMS Vivid torpedoed it off Heraklion, Crete, with Tanais sinking in just 12 seconds. Almost everyone onboard died, including hundreds of deported Cretan Jews and Christians as well as Italian PoWs who were onboard. Sources differ as to the number of people who perished in the sinking; estimates vary between 425 and 1,000.

== The ship ==
John Blumer and Co Ltd of Sunderland, England built the ship as Holywood for William France, Fenwick and Company of London. She was launched on 14 December 1906 and completed in January 1907. She was a cargo steamship, and France, Fenwick operated her in the tramp trade.

A Greek shipowner, Stefanos Synodinos, bought her in 1935, renamed her Tanais after the ancient Greek city of Tanais in the Don delta and registered her in Piraeus.

On 26 May 1941 during the Battle of Crete, the Luftwaffe sank Tanais in Souda Bay. She was raised, repaired and taken over by Mittelmeer-Reederei (MMR), a company controlled by the German government that operated merchant ships in the Mediterranean theatre of the war. MMR used her to carry cargo and people between the Aegean Islands and Greek mainland.

== Sinking ==
On late 8 or early 9 June 1944 Tanais, escorted by the submarine hunter UJ 2142 and guard ships GK 05 and GK 06, sailed from Heraklion bound for Piraeus. In her holds were three groups of prisoners: about 265 Jews deported from Chania who had been rounded up a few days before, up to 400 Cretan gentiles linked with the Cretan resistance, and between 100 and 300 pro-Badoglio Italian prisoners of war who had been arrested after the Armistice of Cassibile. Sources differ as to the numbers of Cretan and Italian prisoners. On 20 May 1944, 276 Cretan Jews were arrested and loaded together with Greek underground fighters aboard Tanais which made her way to the port of Piraeus. The plan was to transfer the community to the Haidari concentration camp and from there to deport them to Auschwitz.

On the morning of 9 June, the Royal Navy submarine HMS Vivid sighted Tanais 14 nautical miles (26 km; 16 mi) northwest of the islet of Dia at 35°35′N 25°11′E. Vivid fired a spread of four torpedoes at a range of 2,400 yards (2,200 m). Two hit Tanais, sinking her in just 12 seconds. The number of people who died in the sinking is unknown, but it is believed to include most of the people aboard. One source mentions only 14 people survived; another puts the total of those rescued at 51.

== See also ==
- SS Petrella
