= LI Special Brigade (Italy) =

- Active: 1 February 1942 - 9 September 1943
- Country: Kingdom of Italy
- Branch: (Italy) Royal Italian Army
- Type: Infantry
- Size: Brigade
- Garrison/HQ: Kato Chorio, Crete
- Engagements: World War II

Commanders
- Notable commanders: Luigi Chatrian

Insignia
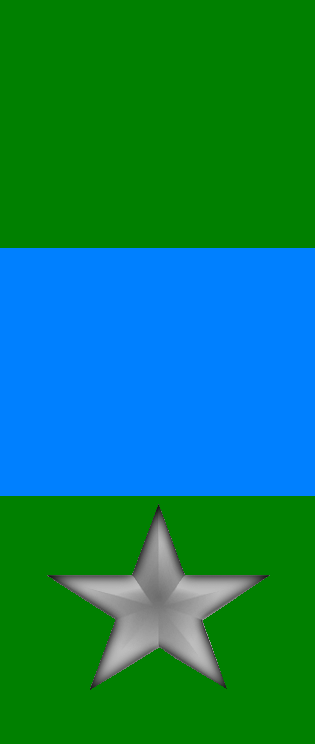
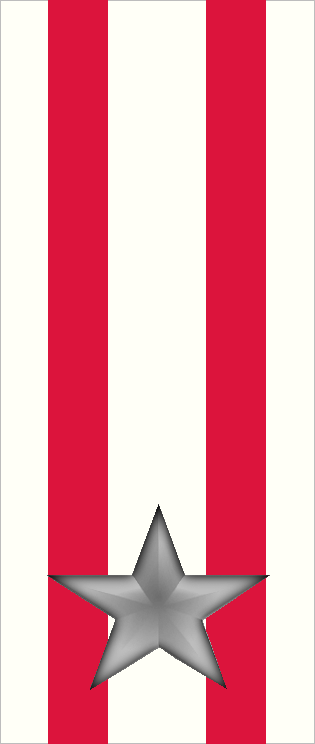
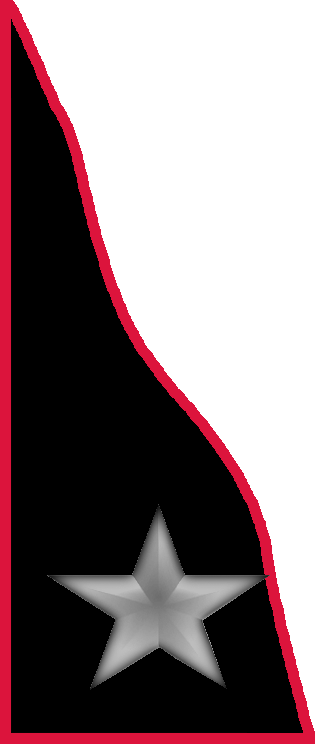
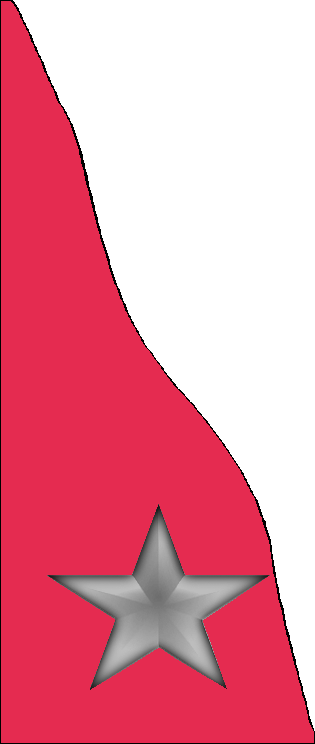
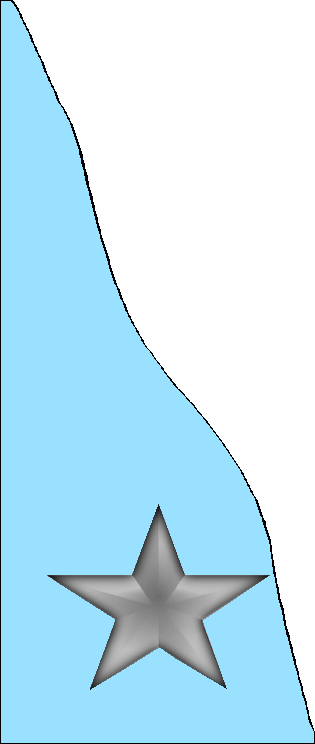
- Identification symbol: LI Special Brigade gorget patches

The LI Special Brigade (Italian: LI Brigata Speciale) was an infantry brigade of the Royal Italian Army during World War II. The brigade was formed on 1 February 1942 in Bari and arrived on 1 March 1942 on the island of Crete. The brigade was assigned to the 51st Infantry Division "Siena", which commanded the Italian contingent of the German-Italian Fortress Crete Command during the Axis occupation of Greece.

The brigade had its headquarter in Kato Chorio and was responsible for the coastal defense of the easternmost part of Crete along the coast between Ierapetra, Kalo Chorio, Sitia, and Palaikastro. After the Armistice of Cassibile was announced on 8 September 1943 the brigade surrendered to the Germans.

== Organization ==
- LI Special Brigade
  - 265th Infantry Regiment "Lecce"
    - Command Company
    - 3 × Fusilier battalions (III Battalion transferred to the 309th Infantry Regiment "Regina", 50th Infantry Division "Regina" on 15 May 1942)
  - 341st Infantry Regiment "Modena" (from the 37th Infantry Division "Modena", joined the brigade on 15 May 1942)
    - Command Company
    - 3 × Fusilier battalions
    - Support Weapons Company (47/32 mod. 35 anti-tank guns)
  - XIV Guardia di Finanza Battalion
  - XI Machine Gun Battalion
  - XI Mortar Battalion (81mm mod. 35 mortars; detached from the 11th Infantry Division "Brennero"
  - IV Coastal Artillery Group
  - VIII Coastal Artillery Group
  - XXXVIII Coastal Artillery Group
  - LVII Coastal Artillery Group
  - CXI Coastal Artillery Group
  - XXIX Engineer Battalion
  - XLII Engineer Workers Battalion
  - 51st Tank Company (L6/40 tanks)
  - 251st Anti-tank Company (47/32 mod. 35 anti-tank guns; detached to the 51st Infantry Division "Siena" from 1 December 1942)
  - 252nd Anti-tank Company (47/32 mod. 35 anti-tank guns)
  - 199th Anti-aircraft Battery (20/65 mod. 35 anti-aircraft guns; detached to the 51st Infantry Division "Siena" from 1 December 1942)
  - 268th Anti-aircraft Battery (20/65 mod. 35 anti-aircraft guns)
  - 269th Anti-aircraft Battery (20/65 mod. 35 anti-aircraft guns)
  - 160th Telegraph and Radio Operators Company

== Commanding officers ==
The division's commanding officer was:

- Generale di Brigata Luigi Chatrian (1 February 1942 - 21 March 1943)
- Generale di Brigata Mario Matteucci (22 March 1943 - 9 September 1943)
