= SS Général Bonaparte =

Coordinates: 43.0167°N 7.6667°E

History
- Name: Général Bonaparte
- Namesake: Napoleon Bonaparte
- Owner: Compagnie Marseillaise de Navires à Vapeur
- Operator: Compagnie de Navigation Fraissinet
- Port of registry: Marseille, France
- Builder: Chantiers & Ateliers de Provence
- Launched: 1 January 1923
- Identification: Code Letters OVSM (1922–34); Code Letters LOGW (1934–43)
- Fate: Torpedoed and sunk 19 May 1943

General characteristics
- Type: Passenger ship
- Tonnage: 2,796 GRT, 1,004 NRT
- Length: 96.11 metres (315 ft 4 in)
- Beam: 13.56 metres (44 ft 6 in)
- Depth: 7.44 metres (24 ft 5 in)
- Installed power: Triple-expansion steam engine
- Propulsion: Screw propeller

Général Bonaparte was a 2,796 GRT passenger ship that was built in 1922 by Chantiers & Ateliers de Provence for the Compagnie Marseillaise de Navires à Vapeur. She was torpedoed and sunk by HMS Sportsman on 19 May 1943 with the loss of 130 lives.

== Description ==
Général Bonaparte was 96.11 metres (315 ft 4 in) long, with a beam of 13.56 metres (44 ft 6 in) and a depth of 7.44 metres (24 ft 5 in). She was assessed at 2,796 GRT, 1,004 NRT. The ship was powered by a four-cylinder triple-expansion steam engine. There were two cylinders of the largest diameter. The engine was built by Chantiers & Ateliers de Provence. It was rated at 484NHP.

== History ==
Général Bonaparte was built in 1922 by Chantiers & Ateliers de Provence, Port-de-Bouc, Bouches-du-Rhône, France for the Compagnie Marseillaise de Navires à Vapeur. She was launched on 1 January 1923. The ship was operated under the management of the Compagnie de Navigation Fraissinet. Her port of registry was Marseille and the Code Letters OVSM were allocated. In 1934, her Code Letters were changed to LOGW.

On 23 October 1937 whilst on board Général Bonaparte, César Campinchi, the Minister of Marine, remarked that he thought war with Italy was "not only inevitable but necessary". He also said that new air bases would need to be established in Corsica, from which an offensive would be launched that would "bring Fascism to its knees". The Italian press were reported to have reacted "violently" to these remarks, although there were not official protests from the Italian Government.

On 19 May 1943, Général Bonaparte was torpedoed and sunk in the Mediterranean Sea 40 nautical miles (74 km) off Nice, Alpes Maritimes by the British submarine HMS Sportsman after being mistaken for an enemy troop transport. She was on a voyage from Ajaccio, Corsica to Nice. There were 68 crew and 199 passengers on board. The 137 survivors were rescued by the Kriegsmarine torpedo boats TA10 and TA11.
