= Angelico Carta =

Italian military officer

- Carta at his HQ in Neapoli, 1942.
- Born: 1886
- Died: Unknown
- Military career
- Allegiance: Kingdom of Italy
- Branch: Royal Italian Army
- Rank: Lieutenant General
- Units: 51st Infantry Division Siena; XIII Army Corps

Angelico (Angelo) Carta (born 1886 in Riola Sardo) was an Italian military officer, best known for his actions during the Axis occupation of Crete in World War II.

== Biography ==
Carta was an artillery officer and became commander of the 51st Infantry Division Siena on 7 January 1941. He participated in the Greco-Italian War and the Battle of Greece. After the Greek capitulation, the Siena Division was sent to the Peloponnese as an occupation force in Greece until late September 1941, when the division was transferred to Crete.

=== Carta in Crete ===
In 1943, Angelico Carta held the rank of Lieutenant general and still commanded the 51st Infantry Division Siena which was assigned to the occupation of the eastern Cretan provinces of Sitia and Lasithi. He was a royalist rather than a fascist and in contrast to the commanders of the German garrison in the western and central parts of Crete, he generally behaved with restraint to the local population.

Following the Armistice of Cassibile, Carta decided to side against the fascist Italian Social Republic. He contacted the Special Operations Executive (SOE) major Patrick Leigh Fermor through the division's counter-intelligence officer, arranging that he and members of his staff sympathetic to the Allies be smuggled to Egypt along with the defense plans for the east of the island. After abandoning his car north-east of the divisional headquarters in Neapoli as a diversion, Carta and his comrades set foot for south-west. Evading German patrols and observation planes he embarked a Motor Torpedo Boat at Tsoutsouro reaching Mersa Matruh the next afternoon, on 23 September 1943.

=== Carta in Sardinia ===
After his return to Italy, Carta became commander of the XIII Army Corps in November 1943, as replacement for general Gustavo Reisoli, who had not opposed the retreat of the German troops on the island to Corsica in September.

== Sources ==
- Koukounas, Demosthenes (2013). Η Ιστορία της Κατοχής [History of the Occupation] (in Greek). Vol. II. Athens: Livani. ISBN 978-960-14-2687-7.
- Leigh Fermor, Patrick (2014). Abducting a General: The Kreipe Operation and SOE in Crete. London: John Murray. ISBN 978-1-4447-9658-2.
