= Hans-Georg Benthack =

German general (1894–1973

- Born: 2 March 1894; Hamburg
- Died: 17 August 1973 (aged 79)
- Military career
- Allegiance: German Empire; Nazi Germany
- Branch: Imperial German Army; German Army (Wehrmacht)
- Service years: 1914–1919; 1936–1945
- Rank: Generalmajor
- Commands: Festungs-Division Kreta
- Conflicts: World War I World War II
- Awards: Knight's Cross of the Iron Cross

Hans-Georg Benthack (2 March 1894 – 17 August 1973) was a general in the Wehrmacht of Nazi Germany during World War II. He was a recipient of the Knight's Cross of the Iron Cross.

Benthack was born at Hamburg in 1894 and entered the Imperial German Army in 1914, shortly after the outbreak of World War I. He served throughout the war, and at its end, he was a Leutnant of the reserves in the 16th Foot Artillery Regiment. With the reduction in the size of the Reichswehr that was mandated by the Treaty of Versailles, he was demobilized and returned to civilian life.

On Germany's rearmament, Benthack returned to military service in the German Army as a battery chief in an artillery observation battalion from October 1936 to October 1939. In World War II, he was the commander of Observation Battalion 10 through November 1941. At that time, he became a course instructor with Training Staff B at Artillery School II in Jüterbog until March 1943. He returned to a field command with the 619th Artillery Regiment on Crete from August to December 1943. He was named Artillery Commander for Fortress Crete in December 1943. He advanced to the overall command of Fortress Crete in October 1944 and was promoted to Generalmajor on 1 December 1944. Benthack remained in this post until the German capitulation in May 1945, when he surrendered the island to British forces.

== Awards and decorations ==
- Iron Cross (1914)
  - 2nd Class (27 May 1917)
  - 1st Class (4 May 1919)
- Hanseatic Cross of Hamburg
- Honour Cross of the World War 1914/1918
- Iron Cross (1939)
  - 2nd Class (3 October 1939)
  - 1st Class (5 June 1940)
- Knight's Cross of the Iron Cross on 10 May 1945 as Generalmajor and commander of Festungs-Division Kreta (Note: Unlawful presentation of the Knight's Cross of the Iron Cross to Hans-Georg Benthack by the Dönitz Government after 8 May 1945. This can be verified by the radio communication dated on 21 May 1945. The presentation date was backdated by Walther-Peer Fellgiebel.)
