= 25th Infantry Division "Bologna" =

Infantry division of the Royal Italian Army during World War II

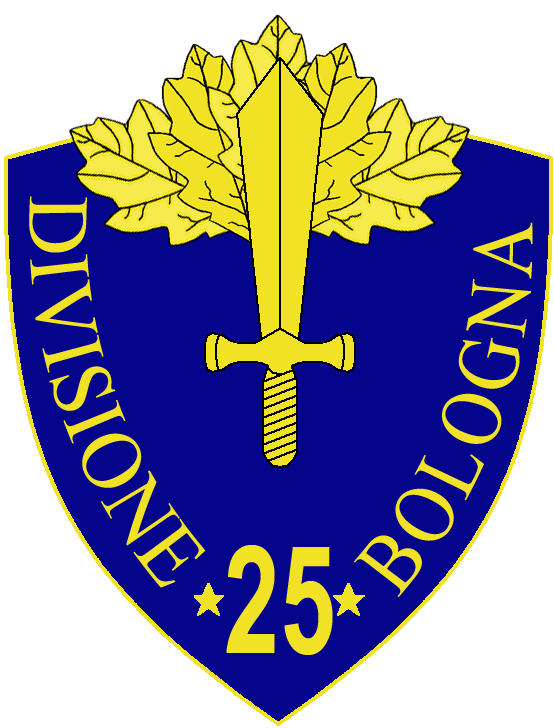
- 25th Infantry Division "Bologna" insignia
- Active: 1939–1943
- Country: Kingdom of Italy
- Branch: Royal Italian Army
- Type: Infantry
- Size: Division
- Part of: XXI Army Corps
- Garrison/HQ: Naples
- Engagements: World War II

Insignia
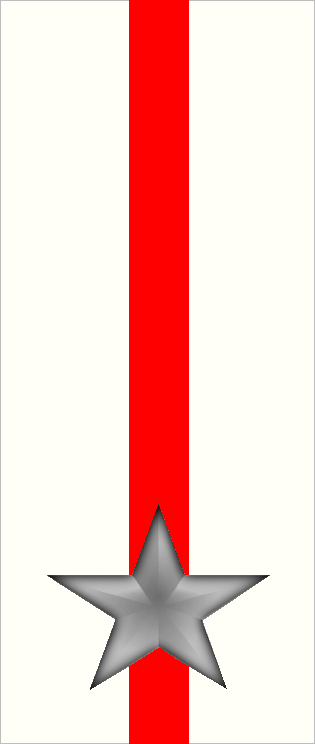
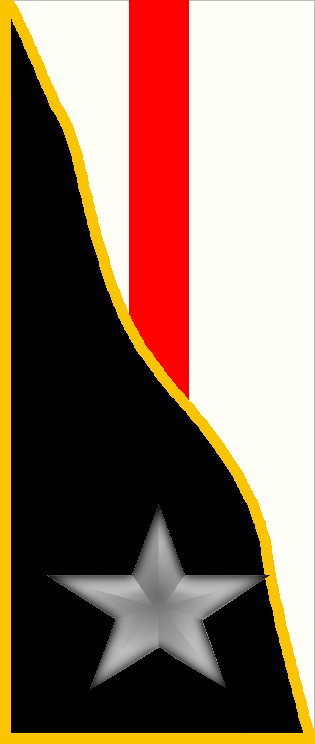
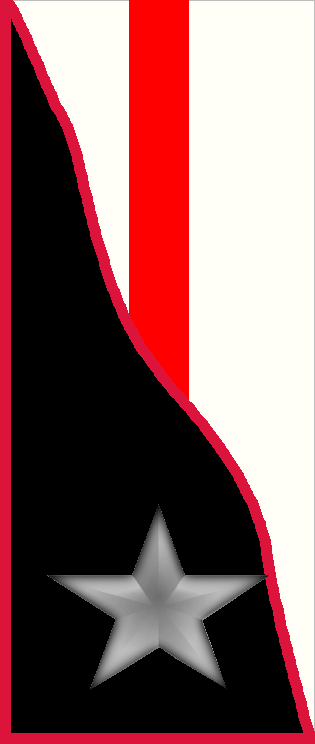
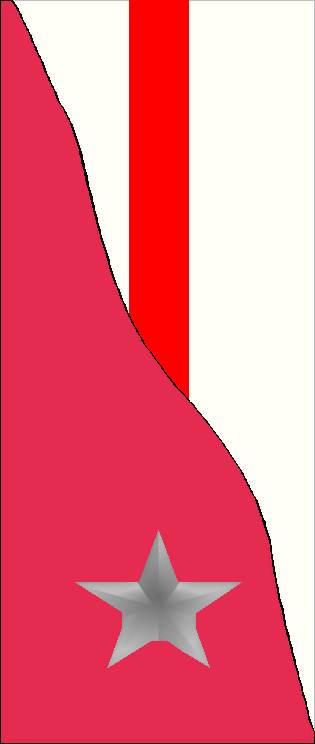
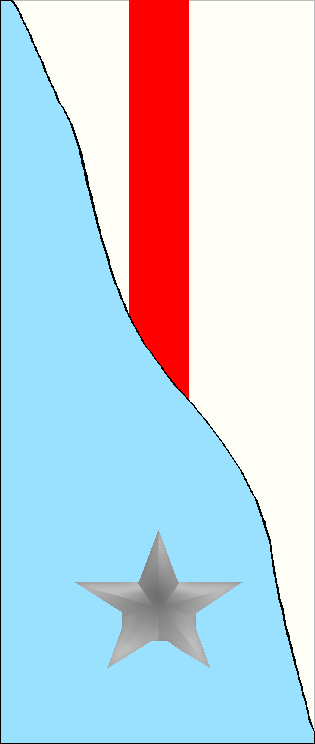
- Identification symbol: Bologna Division gorget patches

The 25th Infantry Division "Bologna" (Italian: 25ª Divisione di fanteria "Bologna") was an infantry division of the Royal Italian Army during World War II. The Bologna was named after the city of Bologna and classified as an auto-transportable division, meaning it had some motorized transport, but not enough to move the entire division at once.

The Bologna had its recruiting area and regimental depots in Campania and its headquarters in Naples. Its 39th Infantry Regiment was based in Salerno until 1939 and then in Caserta, while the 40th Infantry Regiment and the 10th Artillery Regiment were based in Naples. The division's regimental depots were shared with the 60th Infantry Division "Sabratha", which was based in Gharyan in Libya and recruited its men from and trained them in Campania. Shortly after its formation the division was sent to Bir al-Ghanam in Libya. It participated in the Western Desert campaign and was destroyed during the Second Battle of El Alamein.

== History ==
The division's lineage begins with the XII Brigade established in summer 1859 with the 21st and 22nd infantry regiments of the Army of the United Provinces of Central Italy. On 1 October 1859 the brigade received the name "Bologna". On 25 March 1860 the Brigade "Bologna" entered the Royal Sardinian Army three days after the Kingdom of Sardinia had annexed the United Provinces of Central Italy. Already before entering the Royal Sardinian Army the brigade's two infantry regiments had been renumbered on 30 December 1859 as 39th Infantry Regiment and 40th Infantry Regiment.

=== World War I ===
The brigade fought on the Italian front in World War I. On 14 November 1926 the brigade assumed the name of XXV Infantry Brigade with the 15th Infantry Regiment "Savona", 31st Infantry Regiment "Siena", and 40th Infantry Regiment "Bologna". The brigade was the infantry component of the 25th Territorial Division of Naples, which also included the 10th Artillery Regiment. In 1934 the division changed its name to 25th Infantry Division "Volturno". On 27 April 1939 the division transferred the 15th Infantry Regiment "Savona" to the newly activated 55th Infantry Division "Savona" and the 31st Infantry Regiment "Siena" to the newly activated 51st Infantry Division "Siena" and received the 39th Infantry Regiment "Bologna" from the 23rd Infantry Division "Ferrara". On the same date the XXV Infantry Brigade was dissolved and the two regiments came under direct command of the division, which changed its name to 25th Infantry Division "Bologna".

=== World War II ===
==== Arrival in Libya ====
After the outbreak of World War II the Bologna was sent to Libya, where it was garrisoned in Bir al-Ghanam south-west of Tripoli. During the Italian invasion of France from 10-25 June 1940 the Bologna was deployed along the French Tunisian-Libyan border. After the signing of the Franco-Italian Armistice on 24 June 1940 the Bologna returned to its garrison in Bir al-Ghanam.

After the British Western Desert Force had crushed the 10th Army in Eastern Libya during Operation Compass in late 1940 the Bologna's 10th Artillery Regiment "Bologna" and some of its support troops were sent in early January 1941 to shore up the new Italian frontline at Derna and Mechili. The 10th Artillery Regiment fought on the Mechili-Derna line on 25–29 January 1941. After attempts to stop the British offensive failed the Italian forces, including the remnants of the 10th Artillery Regiment, retreated through Marj and Benghazi, but were encircled and destroyed north of Ajdabiya on 5 February 1941. In April 1941 the 205th Artillery Regiment "Bologna" arrived in North Africa as replacement for the destroyed 10th Artillery Regiment "Bologna".

In March 1941 the Bologna and elements of the 17th Infantry Division "Pavia" moved to Sirte and in late May 1941, after the Axis' successful offensive Operation Sonnenblume the Bologna advanced to Tobruk in Eastern Libya.

==== Siege of Tobruk ====
The Italian troops during the Siege of Tobruk were the 132nd Armored Division "Ariete" and 101st Motorized Division "Trieste" of the Italian XX Army Corps, and the 17th Infantry Division "Pavia", the Bologna division, and the 27th Infantry Division "Brescia" of the XXI Army Corps. However all attempts to take the city during the months-long siege failed.

==== Operation Crusader ====
During the British offensive Operation Crusader the Bologna repulsed on 21 November 1941 an attempt by the 70th Infantry Division (2nd/King’s Own, 2nd/Black Watch, 2nd/Queen’s, and 4th Royal Tank Regiment with Matilda tanks) to overrun its positions at Sidi Rezegh.

On 23 November the Bologna withstood another British attack at Bir Garsa, which aimed to break through to Sidi Rezegh. The Bologna's success bought sufficient time to allow the 17th Infantry Division "Pavia" to mount a counter-attack and defeat the British assault. The Bologna's front now extended some 8 miles and on 25 November the thinly spread-out division was assaulted at Balhamed by British forces, which were supported by 50 tanks. The British managed to break through the Bologna's line and were able to establish contact with the besieged forces in Tobruk. The continued British pressure forced the Bologna gradually back to the "Leopard strongpoint", with the division covering its retreat with mines and machine-gun nests. The Bologna's commander ordered a retreat and the division's units cut off to the east of Tobruk broke through British lines towards Al ‘Adam (now Gamal Abdul El Nasser Air Base). On 5 December 1941 the Bologna began to retreat to Gazala and then to Derna, where the division arrived on 11 December. From there the division retreated to Ajdabiya and El Agheila, over 400 km from Tobruk.

==== First Battle of El Alamein ====
During the first half of 1942 the Bologna was deployed at Ajdabiya and around Qārat al Ghazālah. During the First Battle of El Alamein the Bologna was summoned to the El Alamein front on 15 July 1942. Lacking vehicles, the division was forced to march some 400 miles, being reviewed by Mussolini on the way. On 18 July the division entered Egypt. During the night of 25–26 August, the Bologna came under heavy artillery attack, and the New Zealand Māori Battalion, under the cover of darkness, breached part of the Bologna's perimeter. The Māori later reported that there were 100 Italian, dead, wounded or captured during the attack, for 25 killed, wounded and missing New Zealand troops. On 30 August 1942 the Bologna participated in the Battle of Alam el Halfa, during which the division and the German 433rd Infantry Regiment attacked several Indian, South African and New Zealand units on Ruweisat Ridge, and managed to capture Point 211 with the Italians reporting 70 British POWs. but the attackers were later driven back by a counterattack. The division then was stopped by British counter attacks, which continued until 7 September.

==== Second Battle of El Alamein ====
During the initial phase of the Second Battle of El Alamein allied forces subjected the Bologna between 23 and 31 October 1942 on repeated air and ground attacks. On 2 November the Bologna retreated to the western edge of Deir el Beida and after a further resistance on 4 November the division tried to escape the allied forces, which were about to encircle it. The retreat failed and the division's units were overtaken, surrounded by motorized British units and then annihilated one-by-one. Remnants of division fought on 5 November 1942, in Ra’s al Ḩikmah, and on 6 November in Fukah and then in Mersa Matruh, where they were all defeated by 21 November 1942. The Bologna was officially dissolved on 25 November 1942. Some of the Bologna's remaining units were attached to other divisions, which were retreating towards Tunisia, but by February 1943 all of the Bologna's remaining units had been disbanded.

== Organization ==
=== Auto-transportable North-African-type 40/41 ===
25th Infantry Division "Bologna" organization in 1940

25th Infantry Division "Bologna" organization in 1941

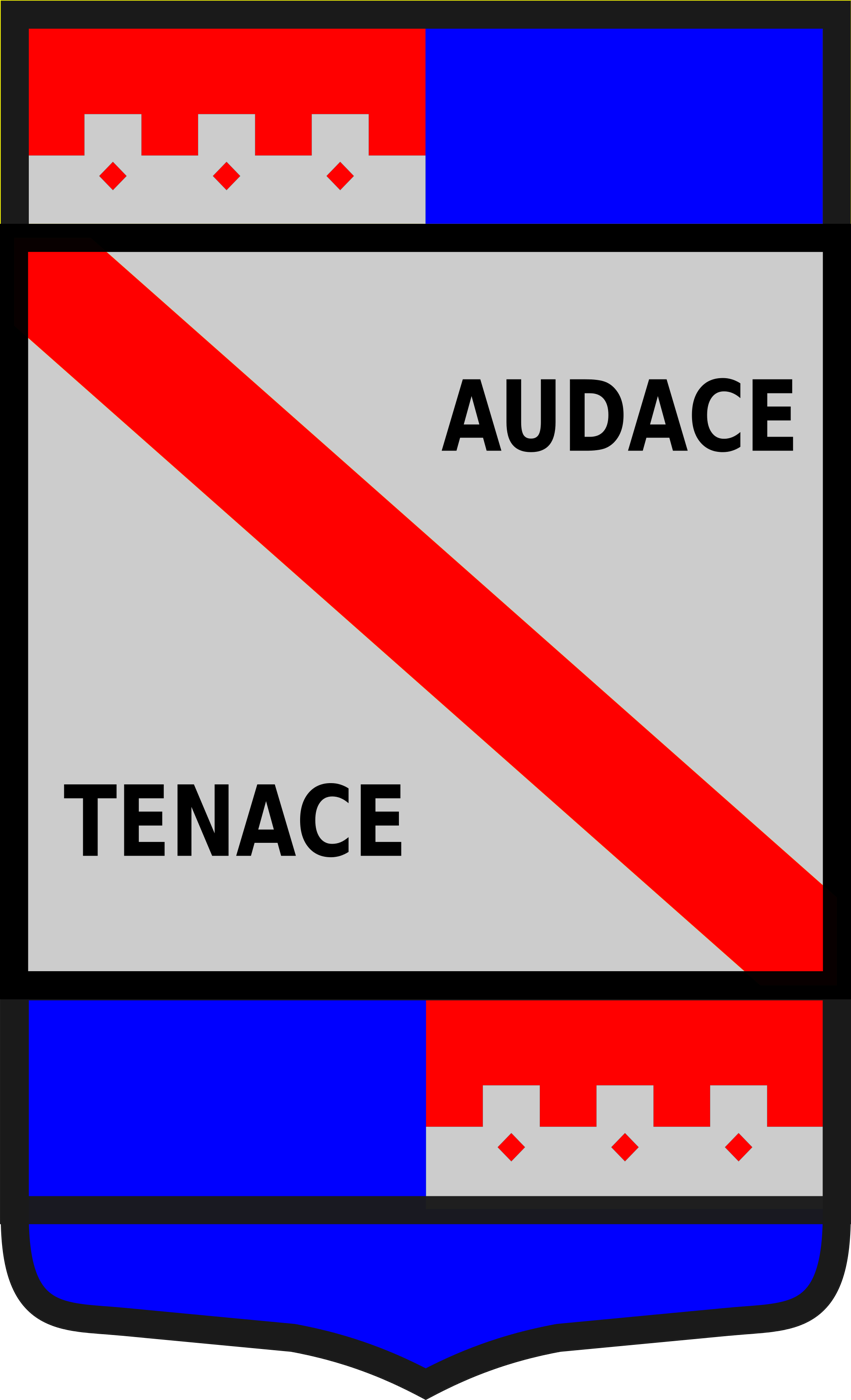
Coat of Arms of the 39th Infantry Regiment "Bologna", 1939

- 25th Infantry Division "Bologna", in Naples
  - Headquarters
    - Command Company
    - 73rd Carabinieri Section
    - 74th Carabinieri Section
    - 58th Field Post Office
    - 25th Infantry Division Command Transport Squad
  - 39th Infantry Regiment "Bologna", in Salerno (switched base with the 15th Infantry Regiment "Savona" in Caserta in April 1939)
    - Command Company
    - 3 × Fusilier battalions (the III Fusilier Battalion was reorganized as III Support Weapons Battalion in summer 1941)
      - Command Company, 3 × Fusilier companies, 1 × Weapons Company (Breda M37 heavy machine guns and 45mm mod. 35 mortars)
    - III Support Weapons Battalion (formed in summer 1941)
      - Command Company, 1 × Machine Gun Company (Breda M37 heavy machine guns), 1 × Anti-tank Company (S-18/1000 anti-tank rifles), 1 × Anti-tank Company (47/32 mod. 35 anti-tank guns)
    - Support Weapons Battery (65/17 mod. 13 infantry support guns; re-equipped with 47/32 mod. 35 anti-tank gun and entered the regiment's III Support Weapons Battalion in summer 1941)
    - Mortar Company (81mm mod. 35 mortars)
  - 40th Infantry Regiment "Bologna", in Naples
    - Command Company
    - 3 × Fusilier battalions (the III Fusilier Battalion was reorganized as III Support Weapons Battalion in summer 1941)
      - Command Company, 3 × Fusilier companies, 1 × Weapons Company (Breda M37 heavy machine guns and 45mm mod. 35 mortars)
    - III Support Weapons Battalion (formed in summer 1941)
      - Command Company, 1 × Machine Gun Company (Breda M37 heavy machine guns), 1 × Anti-tank Company (S-18/1000 anti-tank rifles), 1 × Anti-tank Company (47/32 mod. 35 anti-tank guns)
    - Support Weapons Battery (65/17 mod. 13 infantry support guns; re-equipped with 47/32 mod. 35 anti-tank gun and entered the regiment's III Support Weapons Battalion in summer 1941)
    - Mortar Company (81mm mod. 35 mortars)
  - 10th Artillery Regiment "Bologna", in Caserta (destroyed during the British capture of Tobruk in January 1941)
    - Command Unit
    - I Group (100/17 mod. 14 howitzers)
    - II Group (75/27 mod. 06 field guns)
    - III Group (75/27 mod. 06 field guns)
    - 1 × Anti-aircraft Battery (20/65 mod. 35 anti-aircraft guns)
    - Ammunition and Supply Unit
  - 205th Artillery Regiment "Bologna" (assigned in February 1941 as replacement for the destroyed 10th Artillery Regiment "Bologna")
    - Command Unit
    - I Group (75/27 mod. 06 field guns)
    - II Group (75/27 mod. 06 field guns)
    - III Group (75/27 mod. 06 field guns)
    - 4th Anti-aircraft Battery (20/65 mod. 35 anti-aircraft guns; joined the regiment in March 1941)
    - 17th Anti-aircraft Battery (20/65 mod. 35 anti-aircraft guns; joined the regiment in March 1941)
    - 30th Anti-aircraft Battery (20/65 mod. 35 anti-aircraft guns; joined the regiment in March 1941)
    - Ammunition and Supply Unit
  - 205th Artillery Regiment "Bologna" (after the regiment was motorized in September 1941)
    - Command Unit
    - I Group (100/17 mod. 14 howitzers)
    - II Group (100/17 mod. 14 howitzers; disbanded and personnel distributed among other artillery regiments in October 1941; reformed in May 1942)
    - III Group (75/27 mod. 06 field guns)
    - IV Group (75/27 mod. 06 field guns)
    - 4th Anti-aircraft Battery (20/65 mod. 35 anti-aircraft guns)
  - 205th Artillery Regiment "Bologna" (in December 1941, after the regiment suffered heavy losses during the British Operation Crusader)
    - Command Unit
    - III Group (1 × battery with 100/17 mod. 14 howitzers, 2 × batteries with 75/27 mod. 06 field guns)
    - 4th Anti-aircraft Battery (20/65 mod. 35 anti-aircraft guns)
  - X Machine Gun Battalion (reorganized as Support Weapons Battalion in summer 1941)
  - X Support Weapons Battalion (formed in summer 1941)
    - Command Company, 1 × Anti-tank Company (47/32 mod. 35 anti-tank guns), 1 × Mortar Company (81mm mod. 35 mortars), 1 × Anti-aircraft Battery (20/65 mod. 35 anti-aircraft guns)
  - XXV Replacements Battalion
  - XXV Mixed Engineer Battalion (transferred to the 136th Armored Division "Giovani Fascisti" after the Second Battle of El Alamein)
    - 25th Telegraph and Radio Operators Company
    - 1 × Engineer Company
    - 1 × Searchlight Section
  - 25th Anti-tank Company (47/32 mod. 35 anti-tank guns; entered the X Support Weapons Battalion in summer 1941)
  - 24th Medical Section
    - 96th Field Hospital
    - 528th Field Hospital
    - 66th Surgical Unit
  - 17th Supply Section
  - 135th Transport Section

Units attached to the division:

- IV Tank Battalion L (L3/33 and L3/35 tankettes)
- CCCLVII Guardia alla Frontiera Artillery Group (75/27 mod. 06 field guns)

=== Auto-transportable North-African-type 42 ===
On 2 January 1942, after the Italian divisions had suffered heavy losses of personnel and equipment during the British Operation Crusader, General Ettore Bastico, the commander of Axis forces in North Africa, ordered that frontline infantry divisions in North Africa, with the exception of the 101st Motorized Division "Trieste", should be reorganized according to the new Auto-transportable North-African-type 42 table of organization and equipment. To reduce the logistic requirements the divisions were reduced to 7,000 men and all their support and transport units were transferred to the direct control to the Italian North African Armed Forces Command. The divisions' infantry regiments were cut down to two battalions of four fusilier companies each and the regiment's heavy weapons, along with the heavy weapons of the divisions' Support Weapons Battalion, were distributed equally among the companies. Each fusilier company then consisted of a command, a fusilier platoon, a machine gun platoon with three Breda M37 heavy machine guns, an anti-tank platoon with three S-18/1000 anti-tank rifles, and an anti-tank platoon with three 47/32 mod. 35 anti-tank guns. Bastico also ordered that, if men and materiel should become available, each regiment was to form a third battalion. Additionally it was planned to strengthen the divisions' artillery regiments by adding a fourth artillery group equipped with 100/17 mod. 16 howitzers and an anti-aircraft/anti-tank group with either German 8.8 cm Flak cannons or Italian 90/53 cannons. However, due to the difficulty of shipping the required materiel across the Mediterranean most infantry and artillery regiments never received the full complement of men and material. Afterwards the 25th Infantry Division "Bologna" consisted of the following units:

25th Infantry Division "Bologna" organization in 1942

- 25th Infantry Division "Bologna"
  - Headquarters
    - Command Company
    - 73rd Carabinieri Section
    - 74th Carabinieri Section
    - 58th Field Post Office
    - 25th Infantry Division Command Transport Squad
  - 39th Infantry Regiment "Bologna"
    - Command Company
    - 3 × Fusilier battalions (initially 2 × Fusilier battalions, but by October 1942 the regiment's III Fusilier Battalion had been reformed)
      - Command Company, 4 × Fusilier companies, each consisting of a command, and 1 × Fusilier Platoon, 1 × Machine Gun Platoon (Breda M37 heavy machine guns), 1 × Anti-tank Platoon (S-18/1000 anti-tank rifles), 1 × Anti-tank Platoon (47/32 mod. 35 anti-tank guns)
    - Mortar Company (81mm mod. 35 mortars)
  - 40th Infantry Regiment "Bologna"
    - Command Company
    - 2 × Fusilier battalions
      - Command Company, 4 × Fusilier companies, each consisting of a command, and 1 × Fusilier Platoon, 1 × Machine Gun Platoon (Breda M37 heavy machine guns), 1 × Anti-tank Platoon (S-18/1000 anti-tank rifles), 1 × Anti-tank Platoon (47/32 mod. 35 anti-tank guns)
    - Mortar Company (81mm mod. 35 mortars)
  - 205th Artillery Regiment "Bologna"
    - Command Unit
    - I Group (100/17 mod. 14 howitzers; joined the regiment in May 1942)
    - II Group (100/17 mod. 14 howitzers; joined the regiment in May 1942)
    - III Group (75/27 mod. 06 field guns)
    - IV Group (75/27 mod. 06 field guns; joined the regiment in May 1942)
    - 4th Anti-aircraft Battery (20/65 mod. 35 anti-aircraft guns)
    - Ammunition and Supply Unit
  - XXV Mixed Engineer Battalion (transferred to the 136th Armored Division "Giovani Fascisti" after the Second Battle of El Alamein)
    - 25th Telegraph and Radio Operators Company
    - 1 × Engineer Company
    - 1 × Searchlight Section
  - 24th Medical Section
    - 96th Field Hospital
    - 528th Field Hospital
    - 66th Surgical Unit
  - 17th Supply Section

== Commanding officers ==
The division's commanding officers were:

- Generale di Divisione Giuseppe Pafundi (1938 - 14 February 1940)
- Generale di Divisione Roberto Lerici (15 February 1940 - 31 October 1940)
- Generale di Divisione Pietro Maggiani (4 November 1940 - 2 March 1941)
- Generale di Divisione Mario Marghinotti (3 Marzo 1941 - 28 August 1941)
- Generale di Brigata Carlo Gotti (acting, 29 August 1941 - 3 September 1941)
- Generale di Divisione Alessandro Gloria (4 September 1941 - 25 November 1942)
