= Luigi Chatrian =

Italian politician

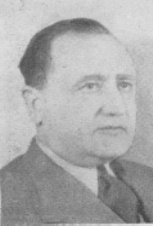
- Born: 7 November 1891; Aosta, Kingdom of Italy
- Died: 22 September 1967 (aged 75); Aosta, Italy
- Military career
- Allegiance: Kingdom of Italy
- Branch: Royal Italian Army
- Rank: Major general
- Commands: Nunziatella Military School; LI Special Brigade "Lecce"; 227th Coastal Division
- Conflicts: World War I; Battles of the Isonzo; World War II; Allied invasion of Italy
- Awards: War Cross of Military Valor

Luigi Chatrian (Aosta, 7 November 1891 – 22 September 1967), also referred to as Louis Chatrian, (French: [lwi ʃatʁijɑ̃]) was an Italian general during World War II. After the war he became a member of the Italian Constituent Assembly and then of the Italian Chamber of Deputies for the Christian Democracy, serving as Undersecretary for Defense from December 1944 to May 1948.

== Biography ==
He was born in Aosta from a family hailing from Torgnon and graduated in law. He fought In World War I as a lieutenant in the 4th Alpini Regiment, being wounded in action and awarded a War Cross for Military Valor for courage displayed during the fighting in the Julian Alps in the summer of 1915. From 1928 to 1931 he served as instructor of organization and mobilization at the War School of the Royal Italian Army, then as chief instructor of organization and mobilization from 1931 to 1933 and finally as commandant of the Nunziatella Military School of Naples. From October 1935 to October 1937 he commanded the 9th Alpini Regiment.

During the early part of World War II Chatrian, as a French speaker, was attached to the Italian Armistice Commission with France. In February 1942 he assumed command of the LI Special Brigade "Lecce", stationed in Crete for garrison duty, being promoted to brigadier general in April 1942. He left command of the brigade in March 1943, and after spending three months at the Naples Territorial Defence Command and being promoted to major general, on 12 June 1943 he assumed command of the 227th Coastal Division, stationed in Calabria (with headquarters in Castrovillari).

On 5 September 1943, after the Allied landings in Calabria, nineteen soldiers of the 76th Coastal Battalion, stationed in Acquappesa and part of the 227th Division, deserted together to return to their homes (all hailed from Calabria); five were recaptured after a few hours, and Chatrian gave order to summarily execute them by firing squad. The military chaplain of the battalion intervened, persuading the battalion commander to suspend the execution and trying to convince Chatrian that the war was lost and the execution of the deserters, who had abandoned their post to protect their families from acts of violence by the retreating German troops, would be pointless; the general replied that they were to be executed anyway to "set an example". On 8 September the execution was postponed again due to the announcement of the Armistice of Cassibile, which ended the hostilities between Italy and the Allies; after a few hours, however, Chatrian once again ordered to carry out the execution, which was done in the night between 8 and 9 September. In 1945 Chatrian was indicted for these killings but absolved, further investigation being prevented by his parliamentary immunity, although in 1968 – after his death – the Italian Court of Audit ruled that his order had been "a mistake" and "gravely illegal".

In December 1944 Chatrian was appointed State Undersecretary for War in the Bonomi III Cabinet, a post he retained under the next five governments: Parri, De Gasperi I, De Gasperi II, De Gasperi III and De Gasperi IV, until 1948 (in the latter two cabinets, his post was renamed to State Undersecretary for Defense). In the same year he was elected to the Italian Constituent Assembly with the Christian Democracy, and then again to the Italian Chamber of Deputies, where he chaired the Defense Commission. He was among the promoters of the autonomy of the Aosta Valley, alongside Federico Chabod.

After the end of the legislature, he retired to private life and died in 1967.
