= 51st Infantry Division "Siena" =

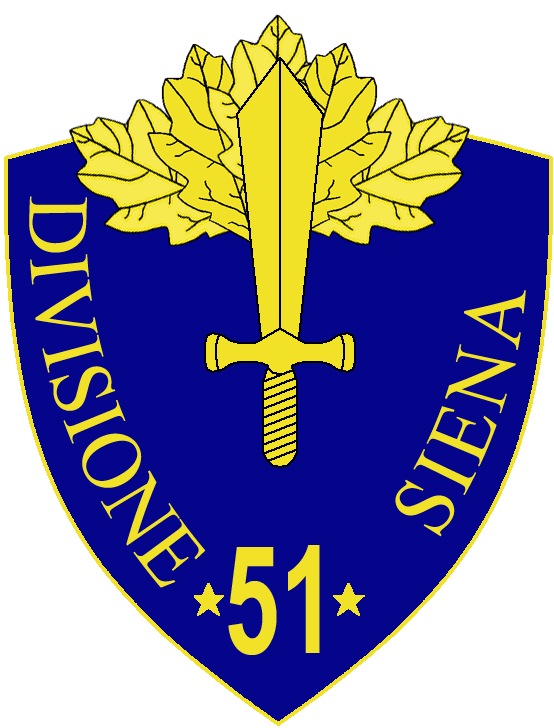
- 51st Infantry Division "Siena" insignia
- Active: 1939–1943
- Country: Kingdom of Italy
- Branch: Royal Italian Army
- Type: Infantry
- Size: Division
- Garrison/HQ: Naples
- Engagements: World War II

Commanders
- Notable commanders: General Ercole Caligian, General Gualtiero Gabutti, General Giulio Perugi, Lieutenant General Angelico Carta

Insignia
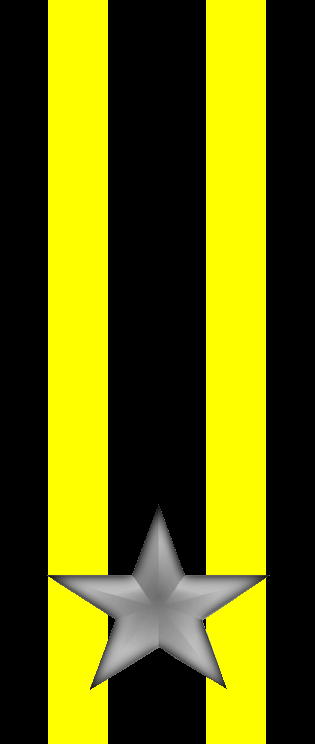
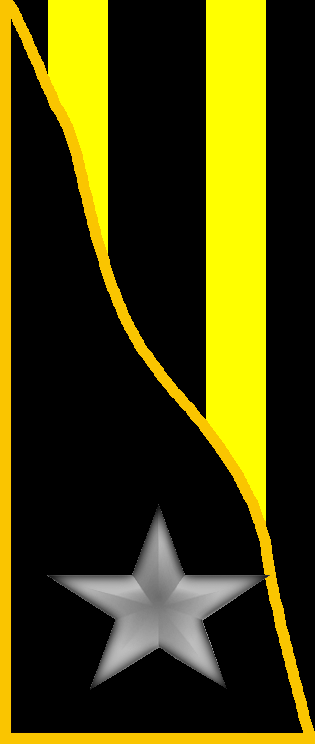
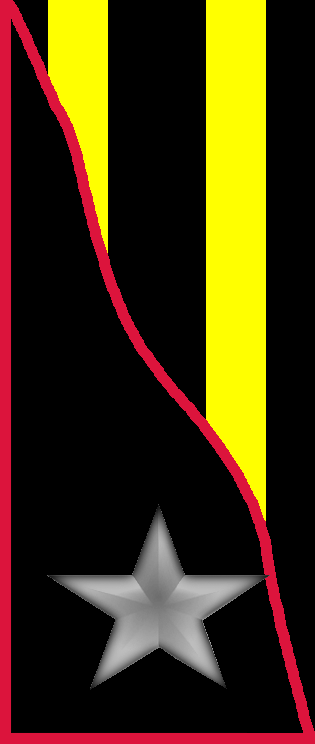
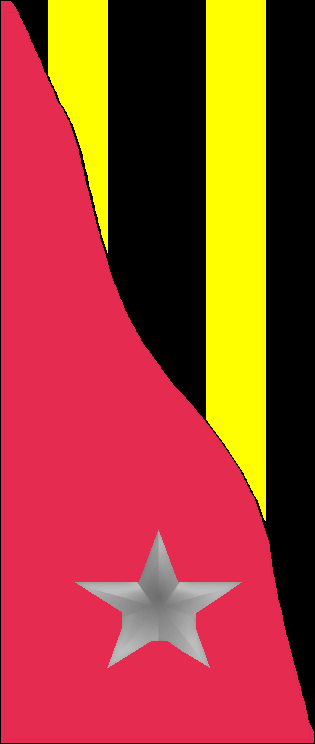
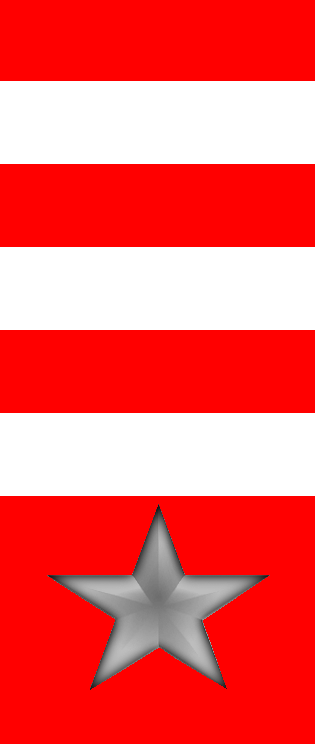
- Identification symbol: Siena Division gorget patches

The 51st Infantry Division "Siena" (Italian: 51ª Divisione di fanteria "Siena") was an infantry division of the Royal Italian Army during World War II. The Siena was formed on 15 September 1939 and named for the city of Siena. The division was a Campanian unit and its men were almost entirely from Naples. After fighting in the Greco-Italian War the division was sent to Crete as garrison unit. There the division was disbanded by invading German forces after the Armistice of Cassibile was announced on 8 September 1943.

== History ==
The division's lineage begins with the Brigade "Siena" established by order of the Provisional Government of the Grand Duchy of Tuscany of 2 July 1859 with the 3rd and 4th infantry regiments. On 25 March 1860 the Brigade "Siena" entered the Royal Sardinian Army three days after the Kingdom of Sardinia had annexed the United Provinces of Central Italy, which included the Grand Duchy of Tuscany. Already before entering the Royal Sardinian Army the brigade's two infantry regiments had been renumbered on 30 December 1859 as 31st Infantry Regiment and 32nd Infantry Regiment.

=== World War I ===
The brigade fought on the Italian front in World War I. On 9 December 1926 the brigade command and 32nd Infantry Regiment "Siena" were disbanded, while the 31st Infantry Regiment "Siena" was transferred to the XXV Infantry Brigade.

On 15 September 1939 the 51st Infantry Division "Siena" was activated in Naples. On the same date the 31st Infantry Regiment "Siena" and the newly raised 51st Artillery Regiment "Siena" joined the division. On 24 September 1939 the 32nd Infantry Regiment "Siena" was reactivated in Caserta joined the division.

=== World War II ===
On 10 June 1940 the Siena was transferred to Piedmont as reserve unit during the Italian invasion of France. In October 1940 the Siena arrived in Albania for the Greco-Italian War, which began on 28 October 1940. Initially the Siena was deployed in the Delvinë-Konispol region as part of VIII Army Corps, covering the border from the coast to Mal Stugarë, where the 23rd Infantry Division "Ferrara" was deployed. The division participated in the Italian offensive towards the Greek city of Ioannina, but failed to cross the Thyamis river until 6 November 1940 due to heavy Greek resistance. On 6 November 1940 a beachhead across the Thyamis was established, but the division immediately had to turn to a defensive stance because of the rapid pace of Greek reinforcements arriving. On 14 December 1940, the Siena repelled Greek probing attacks, but by 19 December the division retreated with the other Italian forces from the line between Himarë to Kallarat. The Siena was able to stop the Greek advance just short of the valley of Shushicë, on the mountaintops of Mali i Çorajt to Horë-Vranisht. The fighting was bloody, with the infantry regiments of the Siena down to battalion strength. On 24 December 1940 the 33rd Infantry Division "Acqui" arrived to stabilize the front and on 26 December 1940 the Siena was relieved from front line duties and sent to Berat to regroup.

To plug the gap caused by the Greek breakthrough after the Capture of Klisura Pass the Siena returned to the front on 25 January 1941 along the line from Qafa e Kiçokut to Monastery Hill (Height 731) north of Këlcyrë. The division managed to stop the breakthrough, despite frequent Greek attacks. On 8 February 1941 the division once more was sent to the rear. After regrouping, the Siena participated in the Italian Spring Offensive, which started on 19 March 1941 and ended with disastrous results for the Italian troops. In April during the Battle of Greece the Siena captured Këlcyrë on 14 April 1941. On 16 April 1941 the Siena was ordered to stop, while the 47th Infantry Division "Bari" took over frontline duties.

After the fighting ended the Siena was reorganized in the Osum valley. At the beginning of May 1941 the Siena was sent to the Peloponnese in Greece, where it formed garrisons in Corinth, Nemea, Argos and Nafplion. In late September 1941 the division was transferred to the eastern part of the island of Crete, where it assumed the title of Italian Troops in Crete Command (Italian: Comando Truppe Italiane in Creta). On 1 March 1942 the division was reinforced by the LI Special Brigade. On 18 April 1943 parts of the Siena defeated an Allied landing attempt on the island of Koufonisia. The division, together with the LI Special Brigade remained in Crete until September 1943, when Italy signed the Armistice of Cassibile with the Allies. The German forces of the Fortress Crete disarmed the Siena and LI Special Brigade on 9 September 1943.

In October 1943 about 2,000 Italian POWs from Crete were killed, when the ship MS Sinfra that transported them to mainland Greece was sunk by US and British planes. Another 2,670 Italian POWs from Crete drowned in February 1944, when the ship SS Petrella was torpedoed by the British submarine HMS Sportsman.

== Organization ==
51st Infantry Division "Siena" organization in 1940

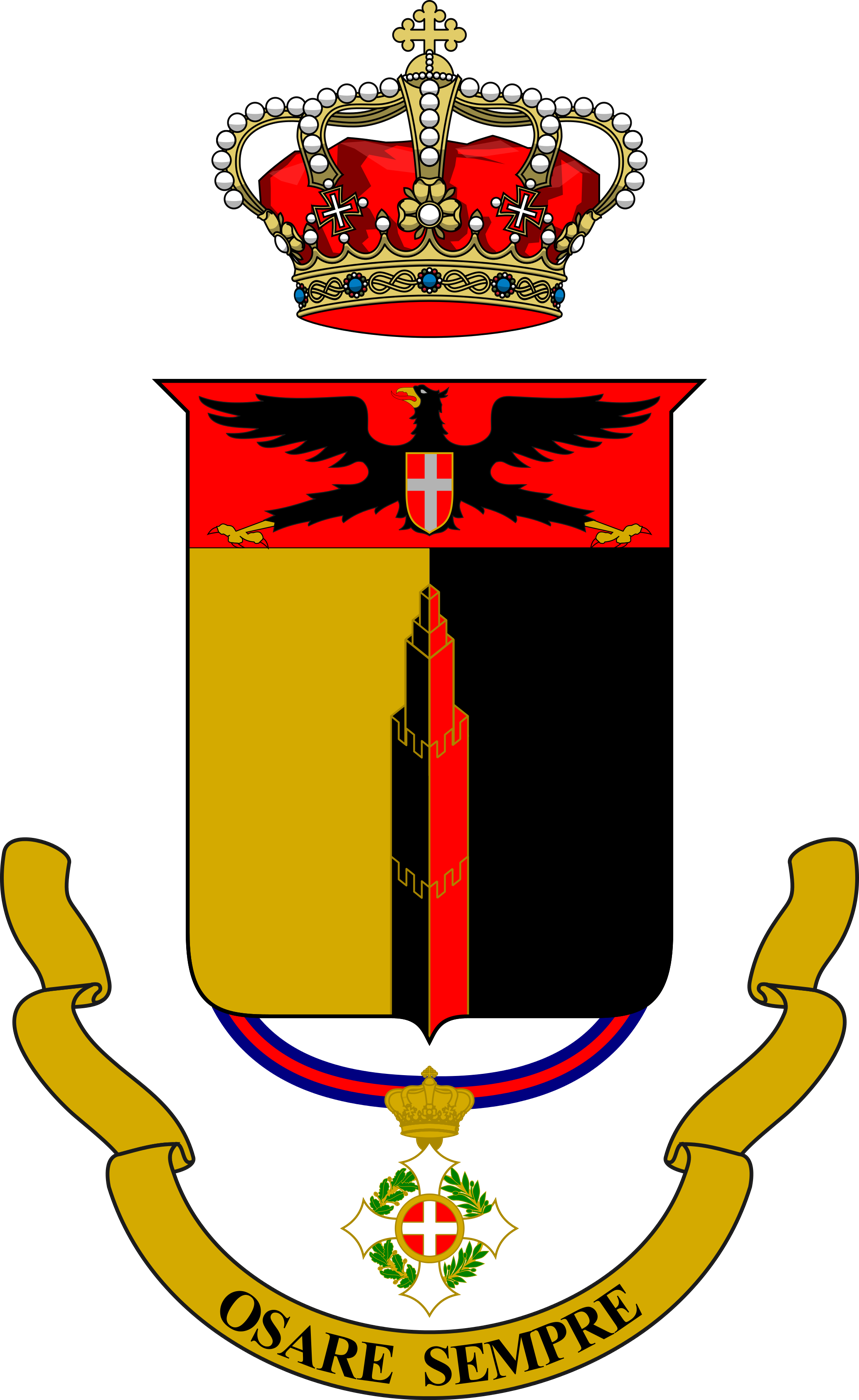
Coat of Arms of the 31st Infantry Regiment "Siena", 1939

- 51st Infantry Division "Siena", in Naples
  - Headquarters
    - Command Company
    - 63rd Carabinieri Section
    - 120th Carabinieri Section
    - 121st Field Post Office
    - 51st Infantry Division Command Transport Squad
  - 31st Infantry Regiment "Siena", in Naples
    - 3 × Fusilier battalions
    - Support Weapons Battery (65/17 mod. 13 infantry support guns)
    - Mortar Company (81mm mod. 35 mortars)
  - 32nd Infantry Regiment "Siena", in Caserta
    - 3 × Fusilier battalions
    - Support Weapons Battery (65/17 mod. 13 infantry support guns)
    - Mortar Company (81mm mod. 35 mortars)
  - 51st Artillery Regiment "Siena", in Caserta (formed by the depot of the 10th Artillery Regiment "Bologna")
    - Command Unit
    - I Group (75/27 mod. 11 field guns)
    - II Group (75/27 mod. 11 field guns)
    - III Group (75/13 mod. 15 mountain guns)
    - 1 × Anti-aircraft Battery (20/65 mod. 35 anti-aircraft guns)
    - Ammunition and Supply Unit
  - LI Machine Gun Battalion (joined the division in 1942)
  - LI Mortar Battalion (81mm mod. 35 mortars)
  - LI Mixed Engineer Battalion (formed in 1943;
  - XXXI Replacements Battalion (joined the division in Albania)
  - XXXII Replacements Battalion (joined the division in Albania)
  - 51st Anti-tank Company (47/32 mod. 35 anti-tank guns)
  - 51st Telegraph and Radio Operators Company (entered the LI Mixed Engineer Battalion in 1943)
  - 83rd Engineer Company (entered the LI Mixed Engineer Battalion in 1943)
  - 51st Medical Section
  - 51st Autocarrette Section
  - 120th Transport Section (joined the division in Crete)
  - 121st Supply Section
  - 851st Transport Section

Attached to the division from 1941 to early 1942:

- 141st CC.NN. Legion "Capuana"
  - CXLI CC.NN. Battalion (remained with the division until September 1943)
  - CLIII CC.NN. Battalion
  - 141st CC.NN. Machine Gun Company

Attached to the division from 1 March 1942:

- LI Special Brigade

Attached to the division from 1 December 1942:

- 3rd Tank Company L (L6/40 tanks)
- 4th Machine Gun Company
- 251st Anti-tank Company (47/32 mod. 35 anti-tank guns; detached from the LI Special Brigade)
- 33rd Artillery Battery (75/27 mod. 11 field guns)
- 137th Artillery Battery (75/27 mod. 11 field guns)
- 199th Anti-aircraft Battery (20/65 mod. 35 anti-aircraft guns); detached from the LI Special Brigade)

== Commanding officers ==
The division's commanding officers were:

- Generale di Divisione Ercole Caligian (15 September 1939 - 30 April 1940)
- Generale di Divisione Gualtiero Gabutti (1 May 1940 - 9 December 1940)
- Generale di Divisione Giulio Perugi (10 December 1940 - 6 January 1941)
- Generale di Divisione Angelico Carta (7 January 1941 - 9 September 1943)
