= 205th Artillery Regiment "Bologna" =

Inactive Italian Army artillery unit

- 205° Reggimento Artiglieria "Bologna"
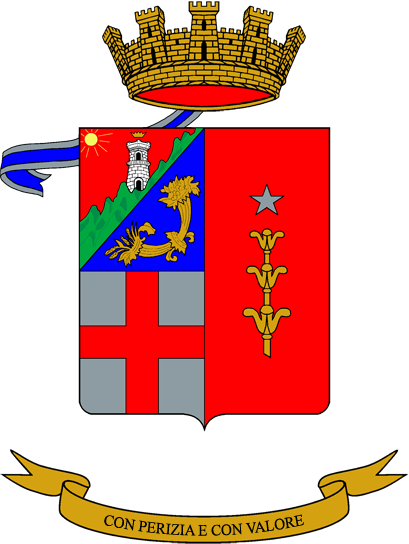
- Regimental coat of arms
- Active: 22 Dec. 1940 — 25 Sept. 1942; 21 Oct. 1975 — 31 Jan. 1991
- Country: Italy
- Branch: Italian Army
- Type: Artillery
- Role: Field artillery
- Part of: Armored Division "Centauro"
- Garrison/HQ: Vercelli
- Motto(s): "Con perizia e con valore"
- Anniversaries: 15 June 1918 - Second Battle of the Piave River
- Decorations: 1x Silver Medal of Military Valor

Insignia
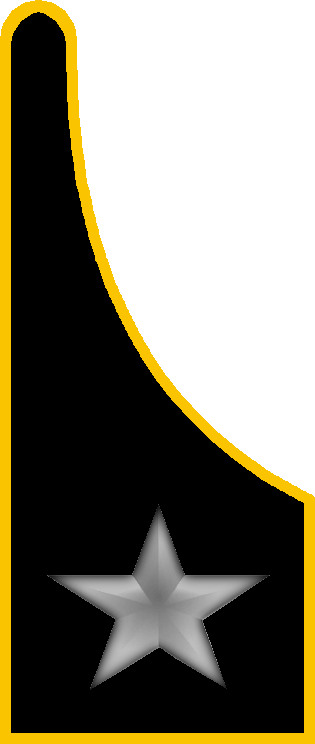
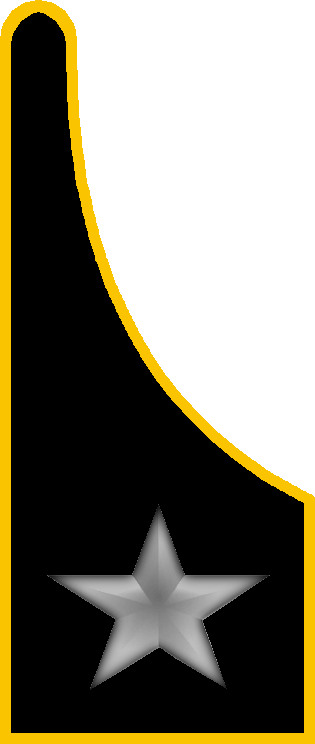
- Regimental gorget patches

The 205th Artillery Regiment "Bologna" (Italian: 205° Reggimento Artiglieria "Bologna") is an inactive field artillery regiment of the Italian Army, which was based in Vercelli in Piedmont. Originally an artillery regiment of the Royal Italian Army, the regiment was assigned in World War II to the 25th Infantry Division "Bologna", with which the regiment was deployed to North Africa for the Western Desert campaign, during which division and regiment were destroyed in the Second Battle of El Alamein. The unit was reformed in 1975 and disbanded in 1991 after the end of the Cold War. The regimental anniversary falls, as for all Italian Army artillery regiments, on June 15, the beginning of the Second Battle of the Piave River in 1918.

== History ==
=== World War II ===
On 22 December 1940 the depot of the 10th Artillery Regiment "Bologna" in Caserta formed the 205th Artillery Regiment. The regiment consisted of a command, a command unit, and three groups with 75/27 mod. 06 field guns. The regiment was formed for the 55th Infantry Division "Savona", which had ceded its own 12th Artillery Regiment "Savona" to units operating in North Africa in the Western Desert campaign, but in February 1941 the regiment was assigned to the 25th Infantry Division "Bologna", whose 10th Artillery Regiment had been destroyed north of Ajdabiya on 5 February 1941 during the British Operation Compass. Upon joining the division, which also included the 39th Infantry Regiment "Bologna" and 40th Infantry Regiment "Bologna", the 205th Artillery Regiment changed its name to 205th Artillery Regiment "Bologna".

In March 1941 the regiment received the 4th, 17th, and 30th anti-aircraft batteries with 20/65 mod. 35 anti-aircraft guns and in April it arrived in Italian Libya, where it joined the division. The division participated in the Siege of Tobruk. In September 1941 the regiment was reorganized and motorized and consisted now of a command, a command unit, the I and II groups with 100/17 mod. 14 howitzers, the III and IV groups with 75/27 mod. 06 field guns, 4th Anti-aircraft Battery with 20/65 mod. 35 anti-aircraft guns, and a battery with 47/32 anti-tank guns.

Already in October 1941 the regiment had to cede the II Group with 100/17 mod. 14 howitzers to compensate for combat losses suffered by other Italian artillery regiments. On 18 November the British Eighth Army commenced Operation Crusader and by 5 December the Axis forces were in full retreat. At the end of December the regiment was reduced to a command, a command battery, the III Group, which fielded two batteries with 75/27 mod. 06 field guns and one with 100/17 mod. 14 howitzers, and the 4th Anti-aircraft Battery with 20/65 mod. 35 anti-aircraft guns.

By May 1942 the regiment had been regenerated and again consisted of two groups with 100/17 mod. 14 howitzers and two groups with 75/27 mod. 06 field guns. In June the regiment distinguished itself in the Battle of Mersa Matruh and in July fought in the First Battle of El Alamein. The regiment was disbanded on 25 September 1942 due to the losses it had suffered in the Battle of Alam el Halfa.

For its conduct in the Western Desert campaign the regiment was awarded a Silver Medal of Military Valor, which was affixed to the regiment's flag and is depicted on the unit's coat of arms.

=== Cold War ===
During the 1975 army reform the army disbanded the regimental level and newly independent battalions and groups were granted for the first time their own flags. On 20 October 1975 the 131st Armored Artillery Regiment of the Armored Division "Centauro" was disbanded and the next day the regiment's V Heavy Self-propelled Artillery Group in Vercelli was reorganized and renamed 205th Heavy Field Artillery Group "Lomellina". The group was named "Lomellina" — a geographic and historic area near Vercelli — as the 40th Mechanized Infantry Battalion "Bologna" already carried the name "Bologna". The group was assigned to the Artillery Command of the Armored Division "Centauro" and consisted of a command, a command and services battery, and two batteries with towed M114 155mm howitzers. On 30 April 1976 the group formed a third battery with M114 howitzers.

On 12 November 1976 the group was assigned the flag and traditions of the 205th Artillery Regiment "Bologna" by decree 846 of the President of the Italian Republic Giovanni Leone. At the time the group fielded 433 men (31 officers, 53 non-commissioned officers, and 349 soldiers).

In early 1982 the group was equipped with modern towed FH70 155mm howitzers. In 1986 the Italian Army abolished the divisional level and so on 31 October 1986 the Armored Division "Centauro" was disbanded. The next day the group was assigned to the Artillery Command of the 3rd Army Corps. On 31 January 1991 the 205th Heavy Field Artillery Group "Lomellina" was disbanded and on 27 February the flag of the 205th Artillery Regiment "Bologna" was returned to the Shrine of the Flags in the Vittoriano in Rome.
