= 227th Coastal Division =

Royal Italian Army infantry division during World War II

- Active: 1943 – 1945
- Country: Kingdom of Italy
- Branch: Royal Italian Army
- Size: Division
- Garrison/HQ: Castrovillari
- Engagements: World War II

Insignia
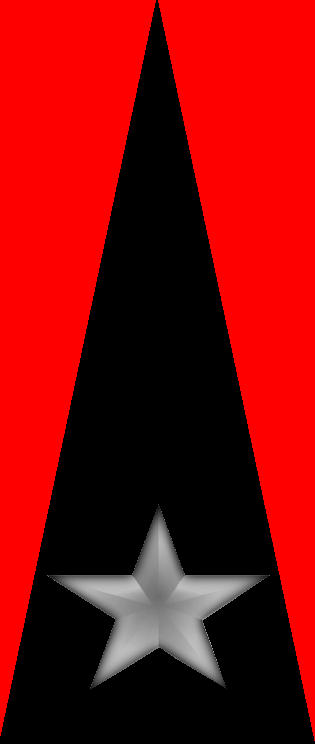
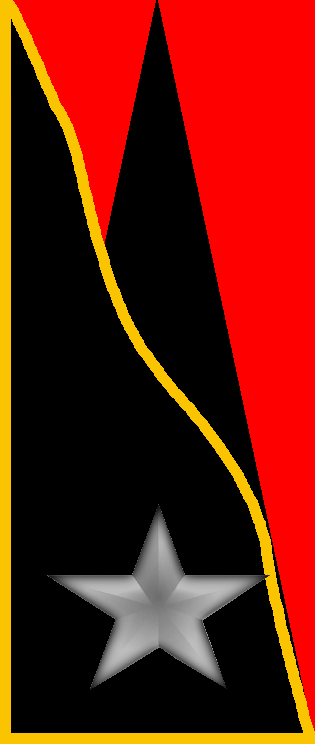
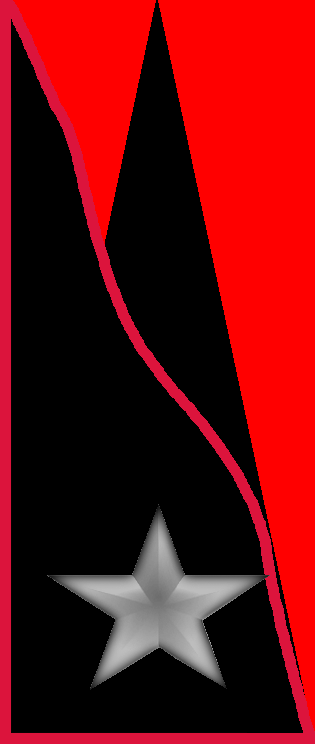
- Identification symbol: 227th Coastal Division gorget patches

The 227th Coastal Division (Italian: 227ª Divisione Costiera) was an infantry division of the Royal Italian Army during World War II. Royal Italian Army coastal divisions were second line divisions formed with reservists and equipped with second rate materiel. They were often commanded by officers called out of retirement.

== History ==
The division was activated on 20 April 1943 in Cosenza by expanding the XI Coastal Brigade. The division was assigned to XXXI Army Corps and had its headquarter in Castrovillari. The division was responsible for the coastal defense of the coast of eastern Calabria: on the Tyrrhenian Sea side from Serra d'Aiello to the river Noce at Castrocucco, on the Ionian Sea side from Sant'Angelo to Nova Siri.

After the Armistice of Cassibile was announced on 8 September 1943 the division refused German demands to surrender and waited for the arrival of the British XIII Corps, which was moving up Calabria after having landed in mainland Italy in Operation Baytown. The 227th Coastal Division surrendered to the British forces and then joined the Italian Co-belligerent Army. For the rest of the Italian campaign the division performed rear area security and work duties as 227th Division for the British Eighth Army. The division was disbanded at in autumn 1945.

== Organization 1943 ==
- 227th Coastal Division, in Castrovillari
  - 141st Coastal Regiment
    - 4 × Coastal battalions
  - 145th Coastal Regiment
    - 3 × Coastal battalions
  - 1st Mixed Engineer Company
  - 450th Anti-paratroopers Unit
  - 227th Carabinieri Section
  - 186th Field Post Office
  - Division Services

== Commanding officers ==
The division's commanding officers were:

- Generale di Brigata Luigi Chatrian (20 April 1943 - ?)
