= Fortress Crete =

Term for garrison and fortification of Crete in World War II

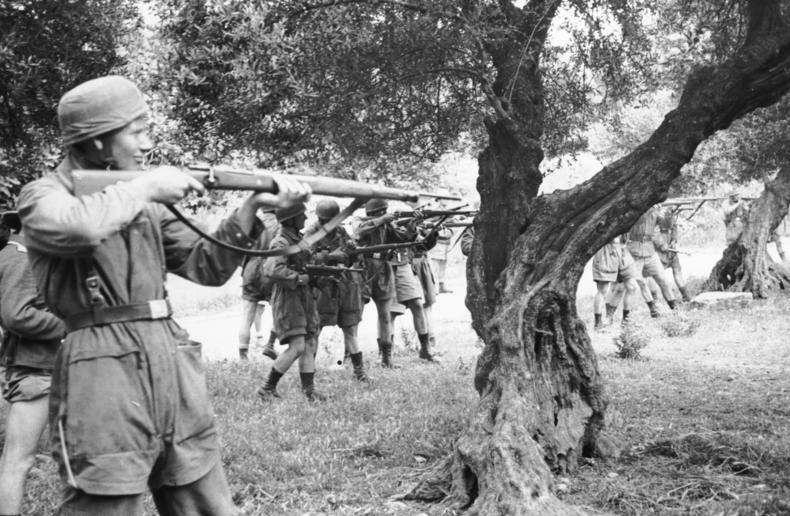
German paratroopers preparing to execute civilians in Kondomari, Crete

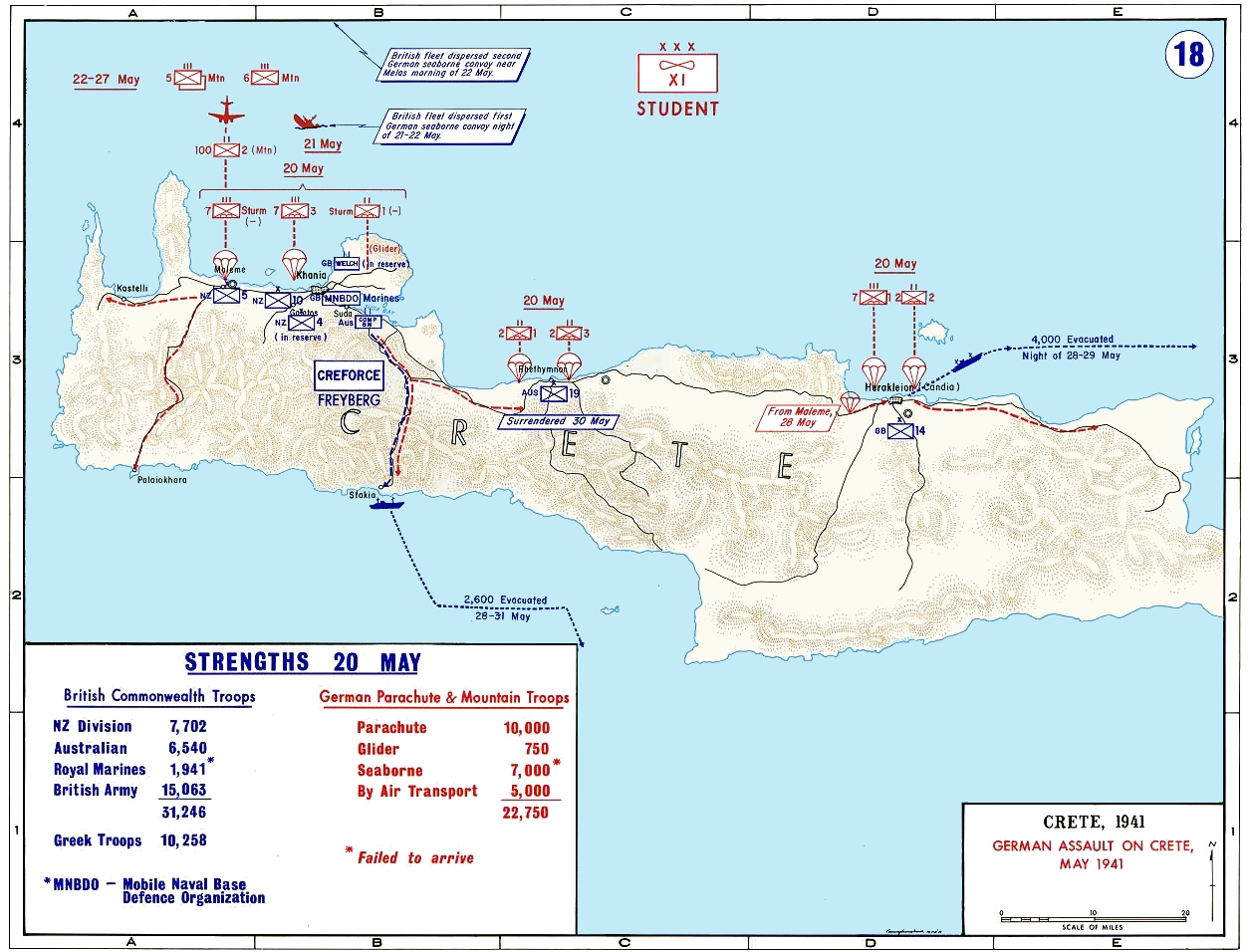
German assault on Crete

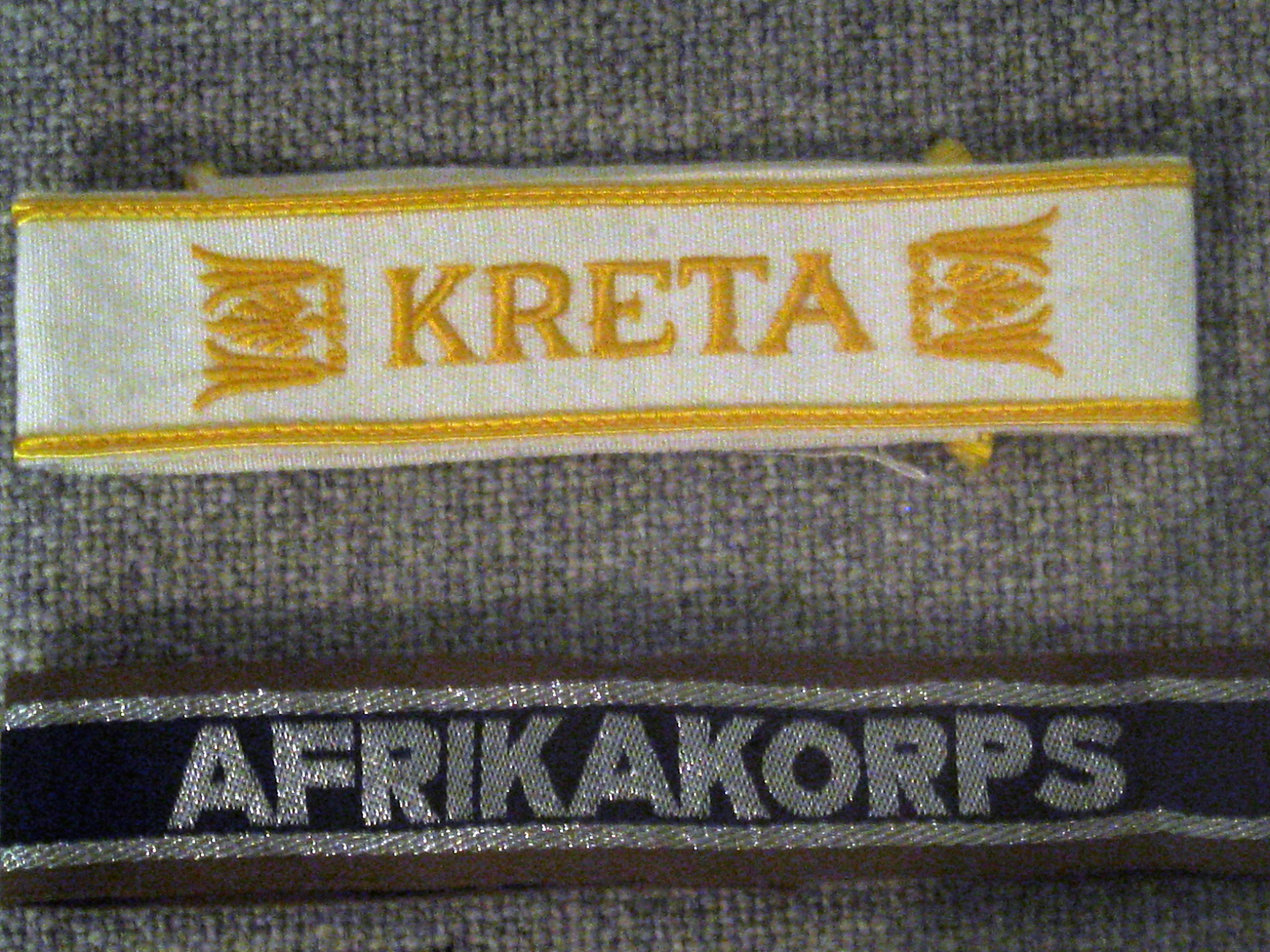
Arm bands of a German soldier who served in Crete and Africa

Fortress Crete (German: Festung Kreta) was the term used during World War II by the German occupation forces to refer to the garrison and fortification of Crete.

== Background ==
The Greek island of Crete was seized by the Axis after a fierce battle at the end of May 1941. The Germans occupied the western three prefectures of the island (the prefectures of Chania, Heraklion, and Rethymno) with their headquarters in Chania, whilst the Italians occupied the easternmost prefecture of Lasithi until the Italian capitulation in September 1943.

== Garrison ==
The first German garrison unit was the 5th Mountain Division, which had seen combat during the capture of Crete. In late autumn 1941, the 5th Mountain Division was replaced by the 713th and 164th Infantry Divisions, which in early 1942 were reorganised as Fortress Division Crete (German: Festungs-Division Kreta - FDK). In the summer of 1942, FDK was split to form the smaller Fortress Brigade Kreta (German: Festungs-Brigade Kreta - FBK) and the 164th Light Afrika Division (German: 164. Leichte Afrika Division) which was sent to North Africa. The 164th was succeeded in 1943–1944 by the 22nd Infantry Division. In autumn 1944, after the 22nd Division withdrew from Crete, the remaining German units on the island were consolidated under the 133rd Fortress Division (German: 133. Festungs-Division). The Italian garrison units were the 51st Infantry Division "Siena" and LI Special Brigade "Lecce", which surrendered to the Germans after the Italian armistice of 1943.

The garrison's strength rose and fell considerably, depending on the progress of the North African and Russian campaigns, and the perceived threat for invasion. Its peak was 75,000 men in 1943 and its nadir 10,000 at its surrender of 12 May 1945.

After the general retreat from Greece in October 1944, the Germans, along with some Italian battalions, remained in Crete and in the Dodecanese islands. They were cut off, possessed no air power or naval forces, with only some small patrol vessels and landing barges to maintain the links among the islands. The food problem was a serious one both for them and the inhabitants. Links were maintained (mainly postal) by some captured B-24 bombers under Luftwaffe colours which made flights at night from Austria.

== Evacuation and surrender ==
The eastern part of Crete was evacuated during the winter by the Axis forces and was then taken by a very weak mixed Anglo-Greek garrison. There was, then, an unofficial truce between the two parties until the final surrender order issued by the OKW in May 1945 after the unconditional surrender on 8 May. British SOE officer Dennis Ciclitira arranged for Generalmajor Hans-Georg Benthack to formally surrender all German forces on the island to Major-General Colin Callander.

== Commanders of the German forces on Crete ==
- 1 June 1941 – 8 June 1941: General der Flieger Kurt Student
- 9 June 1941 – 28 August 1942: General der Flieger Alexander Andrae
- 6 September 1942 – 1 July 1944: Gen.Lt. (Lw) Bruno Bräuer (briefly substituted in April 1944 by Carl-Erik Koehler)
- 1 July 1944 – 18 September 1944: Gen.d.Inf. Friedrich-Wilhelm Müller
- 18 September 1944 – 9 October 1944: Gen.Lt. Ernst Klepp
- 9 October 1944 – 8 May 1945: Oberst (Gen.Maj. after 1 Dec 1944) Hans-Georg Benthack

Until the Italian armistice of 1943, the Italian occupation forces were commanded by General Angelico Carta.
