= HMS Sportsman =

S-class submarine built for the Royal Navy

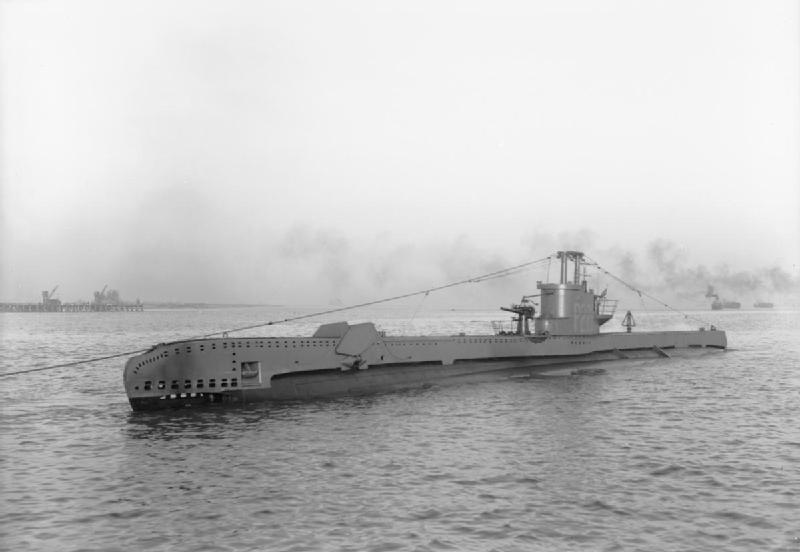
- Sportsman at Sheerness, 23 December 1942

History

United Kingdom
- Name: Sportsman
- Ordered: 14 October 1940
- Builder: Chatham Dockyard
- Laid down: 1 July 1941
- Launched: 17 April 1942
- Commissioned: 21 December 1942
- Out of service: Lent to the French Navy, 8 July 1952
- Badge

France
- Name: Sibylle
- Namesake: Sibyl
- Acquired: 8 July 1952
- Renamed: 8 July 1952
- Fate: Sunk off Toulon, 24 September 1952

General characteristics
- Class & type: S-class submarine
- Displacement: 865 long tons (879 t) (surfaced); 990 long tons (1,010 t) (submerged)
- Length: 217 ft (66.1 m)
- Beam: 23 ft 9 in (7.2 m)
- Draught: 14 ft 8 in (4.5 m)
- Installed power: 1,900 bhp (1,400 kW) (diesel); 1,300 hp (970 kW) (electric)
- Propulsion: 2 × diesel engines; 2 × electric motors
- Speed: 15 kn (28 km/h; 17 mph) (surfaced); 10 kn (19 km/h; 12 mph) (submerged)
- Range: 6,000 nmi (11,000 km; 6,900 mi) at 10 knots (19 km/h; 12 mph) (surfaced); 120 nmi (220 km; 140 mi) at 3 knots (5.6 km/h; 3.5 mph) (submerged)
- Test depth: 300 ft (91.4 m)
- Complement: 48
- Sensors & processing systems: Type 129AR or 138 ASDIC; Type 291 early-warning radar
- Armament: 7 × 21 in (533 mm) torpedo tubes (6 × bow, 1 × stern); 1 × 3 in (76 mm) deck gun; 1 × 20 mm (0.8 in) AA gun

HMS Sportsman was a third-batch S-class submarine built for the Royal Navy during World War II. Completed in 1942, she spent most of the war serving in the Mediterranean Sea. After an initial patrol off Norway, she sank the heavy transport Général Bonaparte in the Mediterranean in 1943 and missed a French oil tanker. She was heavily damaged after a mistaken attack by an Allied bomber, and was sent east after repairs to participate in operations in the Black Sea. After the operation was cancelled, Sportsman patrolled the Aegean Sea, sending several Greek and German ships to the bottom. She sank the German transport SS Petrella in early 1944 despite it being clearly marked as a prisoner-of-war ship, killing 2,670 out of 3,173 Italians aboard. Sportsman sank several more ships, and suffered minor damage when she was detected and sighted while attempting to attack a convoy.

After a refit in the United States, she returned to the United Kingdom where she participated in additional training for operations in the Far East. The deployment was cancelled when the war in the Pacific ended in 1945, and Sportsman was placed in reserve at Harwich. She was transferred in July 1952 to the French Navy, which renamed her Sibylle. The boat was lost with all hands in a diving accident off Toulon on 24 September.

== Design and description ==
The S-class submarines were designed to patrol the restricted waters of the North Sea and the Mediterranean Sea. The third batch was slightly enlarged and improved over the preceding second batch of the S-class. The submarines had a length of 217 feet (66.1 m) overall, a beam of 23 feet 9 inches (7.2 m) and a draught of 14 feet 8 inches (4.5 m). They displaced 865 long tons (879 t) on the surface and 990 long tons (1,010 t) submerged. The S-class submarines had a crew of 48 officers and ratings. They had a diving depth of 300 feet (91.4 m).

For surface running, the boats were powered by two 950-brake-horsepower (708 kW) diesel engines, each driving one propeller shaft. When submerged each propeller was driven by a 650-horsepower (485 kW) electric motor. They could reach 15 knots (28 km/h; 17 mph) on the surface and 10 knots (19 km/h; 12 mph) underwater. On the surface, the third-batch submarines had a range of 6,000 nautical miles (11,000 km; 6,900 mi) at 10 knots (19 km/h; 12 mph) and 120 nmi (220 km; 140 mi) at 3 knots (5.6 km/h; 3.5 mph) submerged.

The boats were armed with seven 21-inch (533 mm) torpedo tubes. A half-dozen of these were in the bow and there was one external tube in the stern. They carried six reload torpedoes for the bow tubes for a total of thirteen torpedoes. Twelve mines could be carried in lieu of the internally stowed torpedoes. They were also armed with a 3-inch (76 mm) deck gun. It is uncertain if Sportsman was completed with a 20-millimetre (0.8 in) Oerlikon light AA gun or had one added later. The third-batch S-class boats were fitted with either a Type 129AR or 138 ASDIC system and a Type 291 or 291W early-warning radar.

== Construction and career ==
Ordered on 14 October 1940 as part of the 1940 Naval Programme, Sportsman was laid down on 1 July 1941 at Chatham Dockyard. She was launched on 17 April 1942 and commissioned on 21 December that same year. Thus far she has been the only ship of the Royal Navy to bear the name Sportsman.

On 22 December, the boat left Chatham and arrived at Sheerness. From 23 to 24 December, she conducted sea trials off Sheerness, then left for Portsmouth on 25 December, arriving the next day. Sportsman conducted additional sea trials there as well as exercises until 1 January 1943. On 3 January, she left Portsmouth for Holy Loch, together with the submarines HMS Uproar and HMS Oberon, under the escort of the trawler HMS Unst until the armed yacht HMS Star of India took over in the morning of the 4th. Between 6 January and 13 February, Sportsman took part in training exercises around Holy Loch, along with the destroyer HMS Ambuscade and Uproar. On the 13th, the boat departed Holy Loch for Lerwick, Scotland, in company with the submarines HMS Sea Nymph and HMS Truculent and the escort of the armed yacht HMS Cutty Sark.

Arriving at Lerwick on 16 February 1943, Sportsman departed several hours later for her first war patrol. The boat was to protect convoy operations from and to Northern Russia. She returned to Lerwick after her uneventful patrol on 11 March. The next day, she sailed to Holy Loch, then on 18 March, to Greenock for repairs. After returning to Holy Loch, she departed for Gibraltar, arriving on 12 April.

=== Mediterranean career ===
After exercises, Sportsman left Gibraltar on 18 April 1943 for her second war patrol off the Spanish coast, arriving at Algiers on the 29th. After repairs at Algiers, involving her ASDIC dome cover and a defective ballast tank, the submarine left for her third war patrol in the Gulf of Genoa and Gulf of Lion. On 19 May, 40 nautical miles (74 km) off Nice, the boat sank the Vichy French passenger ship Général Bonaparte, on a voyage from Ajaccio, Corsica to Nice. There were 68 crew and 199 passengers on board, of which 137 survivors were rescued by the German torpedo boats TA10 and TA11. A week later, on the 26th, Sportsman sighted the 12,309-gross register ton (GRT) French oil tanker Marguerite Finaly south of Îles d'Hyères and fired six torpedoes, but all missed their target. On 28 May, she attempted to attack a German tugboat while surfaced, but the submarine's gun jammed after firing four rounds. On 2 June, she returned to Algiers, completing her third patrol.

Sportsman left Algiers on 19 June, tasked with patrolling the Gulf of Genoa and landing two special operations agents in Italy. During the night of 27/28 June, the boat landed one agent near Sanremo, but the other refused to leave the boat. On the 29th, she sighted the 2,220 GRT Italian merchant ship Bolzaneto and sank her with one torpedo. There were 28 civilians and 8 crew members aboard, of whom 12 and 2 survived, respectively. During the night of 30 June/1 July, Sportsman landed a raiding force near Bordighera, Italy, to sabotage a railway line. The attempt failed after the party could not find their target. On 1 July, the boat attacked a convoy of landing craft and small ships, but her gun jammed after five rounds. She ended her fourth patrol in Algiers on the 6th.

Sportsman departed Algiers on 23 July after conducting anti-submarine exercises, tasked with patrolling the northern part of the Tyrrhenian Sea, east of Corsica. She returned on 11 August after an uneventful patrol.

On 25 August, Sportsman left Algiers to conduct training exercises, and on 28 August departed for her 6th war patrol. The boat was ordered to patrol the area east of Corsica. On 6 September, she sank the Italian fishing vessels Angiolina P. and Maria Luisa B. with gunfire. After learning of the Italian armistice, on 9 September the boat set course for Bastia, Corsica. She began an attack on a large German fishing trawler, but had to dive after coastal batteries opened fire on Sportsman and her target during the action off Bastia. Three days later, she picked up 44 survivors from the Italian Navigatori-class destroyer Ugolino Vivaldi, which had been sunk by the Germans while trying to pass through the Strait of Bonifacio to reach an Allied-held port on 9 September.

The next day, at 04:51, Sportsman was mistakenly attacked by a B-24 Liberator of the American 480th Bombardment Squadron. Seven depth charges were dropped, one which hit the radar array, wounding one crew member, and another landed on the submarine's deck, although it was not noticed at the time. The submarine dived and, when at 25 feet (7.6 m) depth, the depth charge exploded, destroying the bridge and causing serious damage. The boat arrived at Algiers on 14 September for repairs.

=== Aegean Sea ===
After repairs and trials off Algiers, Sportsman sailed for Malta together with HMS Sibyl on 22 October 1943, arriving three days later. On 26 October, she left Malta for Beirut and arrived there on the 31st. The boat departed Beirut for Haifa, on 3 November, arriving there the next day. It was planned for her to operate in the Black Sea, but the deployment was cancelled. On 6 November, Sportsman departed Haifa on her seventh war patrol, this time in the Aegean Sea. On 15 November, the boat sank the 70 GRT Greek sailing vessel Eleftherios V with gunfire north of Naxos, Greece. Three days later, she fired six torpedoes at a German destroyer or torpedo boat, but all missed their target. On 20 November, Sportsman used her guns to sink the Greek ship Evangelistria off Suda Bay, Crete, then returned to Beirut on 24 November.

On 10 December, Sportsman departed Beirut on her eighth war patrol, again in the Aegean Sea. On 19 December, the submarine sank the Greek vessel Zora south of Lemnos Island with a demolition charge after the crew was taken off. Two days later, Sportsman damaged the ship Agios Spiridon in the same area. Sportsman next torpedoed and sank the 3,838 GRT Bulgarian transport Balkan south of Mudros, Greece at 39°44′N 25°16′E on 23 December, despite being escorted by the destroyer TA-14, the minesweeper R-211 and the E-boat S-54. The submarine then ended her patrol on 30 December in Beirut.

Sportsman's next patrol began on 30 January 1944, her third in the Aegean Sea. On 8 February, Sportsman sighted the 4,785 GRT German transport Petrella, en route from Souda to Piraeus, and attacked it with four torpedoes at 35°34′N 24°18′E despite its being clearly marked as a prisoner-of-war (POW) transport. Of the 3,173 Italian prisoners of war aboard Petrella, 2,670 were killed, mostly because the German guards failed to release most of the POWs. On 13 February, Sportsman arrived at Beirut, then left the next day for Port Said, Egypt, for a short refit before being sent to the Far East. On 17 March the RN decided not to send her there as she did not have an air-conditioning unit, and the boat instead departed three days for another patrol in the Aegean.

On 28 March, Sportsman sighted the 425 GRT German tanker Vienna and sank her with torpedoes off Monemvasia, Greece, at 36°41′N 23°03′E. (Note: According to German sources, Vienna ran aground during high winds.) Three days later, the submarine sank the German motor vessel Grauer Ort, sailing from Monemvasia to Gythion, off Cape Maleas. Eight of Grauer Ort's crew were taken as prisoners of war. Sportsman ended her tenth war patrol in Malta on 10 April.

Again ordered to patrol the Aegean Sea, Sportsman departed on 18 April. On 28 April, the boat sank the heavily defended, 5,809 GRT German merchant ship Lüneburg north of Iraklion, Crete, at 35°26′N 25°07′E and the submarine successfully evaded her escorts. On 3 May, she attempted to attack another heavily defended convoy, formed by the German cargo ships Gertrud and Suzanne and five to seven escorts. Sportsman was detected with sonar and her periscope was then spotted by one of the defending ships. The boat dived and suffered only minor damage from the subsequent depth-charge attacks, then returned to Malta after three days, ending her patrol.

On 25 May 1944, Sportsman departed Malta for Gibraltar, arriving on 31 May, then, after conducting training exercises, left for Holy Loch on 9 June. She arrived on 20 June, and left the next day for Scapa Flow. The submarine then sailed for Dundee on 25 June, and conducted additional training until 3 September, when she shifted to Blyth. She was sent to the United States on 8 October and arrived in Philadelphia Navy Yard on 27 October for a refit. On 5 April 1945, participating in exercises off Philadelphia and New London, Sportsman set sail for the United Kingdom, escorted by the frigate HMCS Carlplace. After a stop at Horta, Azores, for fuel, Sportsman arrived at Holy Loch on 23 April, then left for Scapa Flow on 6 July. Sportsman took part in various training exercises there until she departed for Rothesay on 20 July, to be deployed in the Far East. However, this assignment was cancelled when the war in the Pacific ended in August. Sportsman was placed in reserve on 20 December at Harwich.

=== French service and loss ===
On 8 July 1952 she was lent to the French Navy, who renamed her Sibylle. She was in service briefly, for just 11 weeks, under the command of Lieutenant de Vaisseau Gustave Curot. On 24 September 1952, Sibylle was lost with all hands off Toulon during anti-submarine exercises. After diving, Sibylle's course was followed with sonar by other ships until 8:20, but she failed to surface as expected at 9:30. Search planes from the French Admiralty found a large oil patch six miles (9.7 km) east of Cape Camarat, in an area where the sea is 2,400 feet (730 m) deep. The submarine's emergency-location buoy was later found, but the cable connecting it to the boat was broken.

== Sinkings ==
During her service with the Royal Navy, Sportsman sank 12 Axis ships for a total of 20,242 GRT.

Date	Name of ship	Tonnage	Nationality	Fate and location
19 May 1943	Général Bonaparte	2,795	Vichy France	Torpedoed and sunk at 43°01′N 07°40′E
29 June 1943	Bolzaneto	2,220	Kingdom of Italy	Torpedoed and sunk at 44°10′N 09°32′E
6 September 1943	Angiolina P	41	Kingdom of Italy	Sunk with gunfire at 44°10′N 09°32′E
6 September 1943	Maria Luisa B	37	Kingdom of Italy	Sunk with gunfire at 44°10′N 09°32′E
15 November 1943	Eleftherios V	70	Greece	Sunk with gunfire at 37°13′N 25°32′E
20 November 1943	Evangelistria	-	Greece	Sunk with gunfire at 35°33′N 24°15′E
19 December 1943	Zora	10	Greece	Sunk with demolition charges at 39°44′N 25°06′E
23 December 1943	Balkan	3,838	Germany	Torpedoed and sunk at 39°44′N 25°16′E
8 February 1944	Petrella	4,785	Germany	Torpedoed and sunk at 35°34′N 24°18′E
28 March 1944	Vienna	425	Germany	Torpedoed and sunk at 36°41′N 23°03′E
31 March 1944	Grauer Ort	212	Germany	Torpedoed and sunk at 36°38′N 23°13′E
28 April 1944	Lüneburg	5,809	Germany	Torpedoed and sunk at 35°26′N 25°07′E
