= 227th Brigade =

227th Brigade may refer to:

- 227th Artillery Brigade (Russia)
- 227th Mixed Brigade (Spain)
- 227th Brigade, Royal Field Artillery, United Kingdom
- 227th Infantry Brigade (United Kingdom)
