= Brzeg =

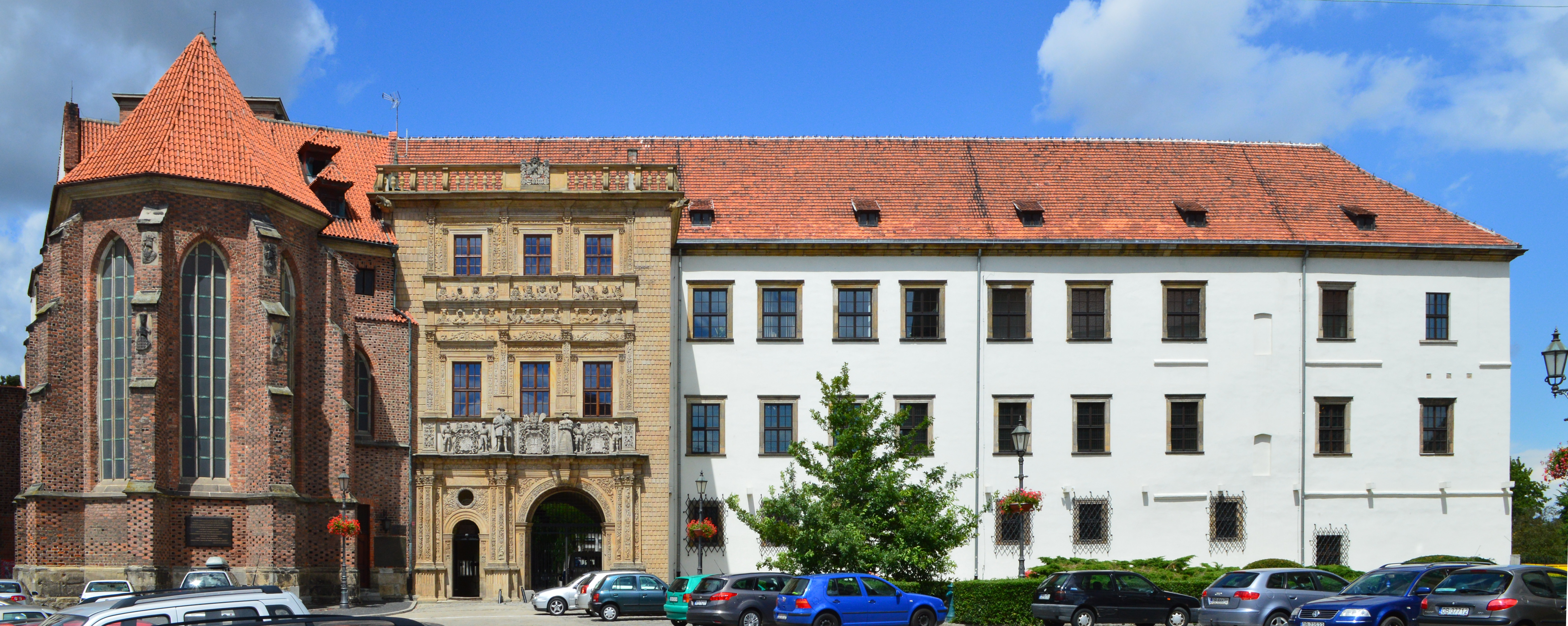
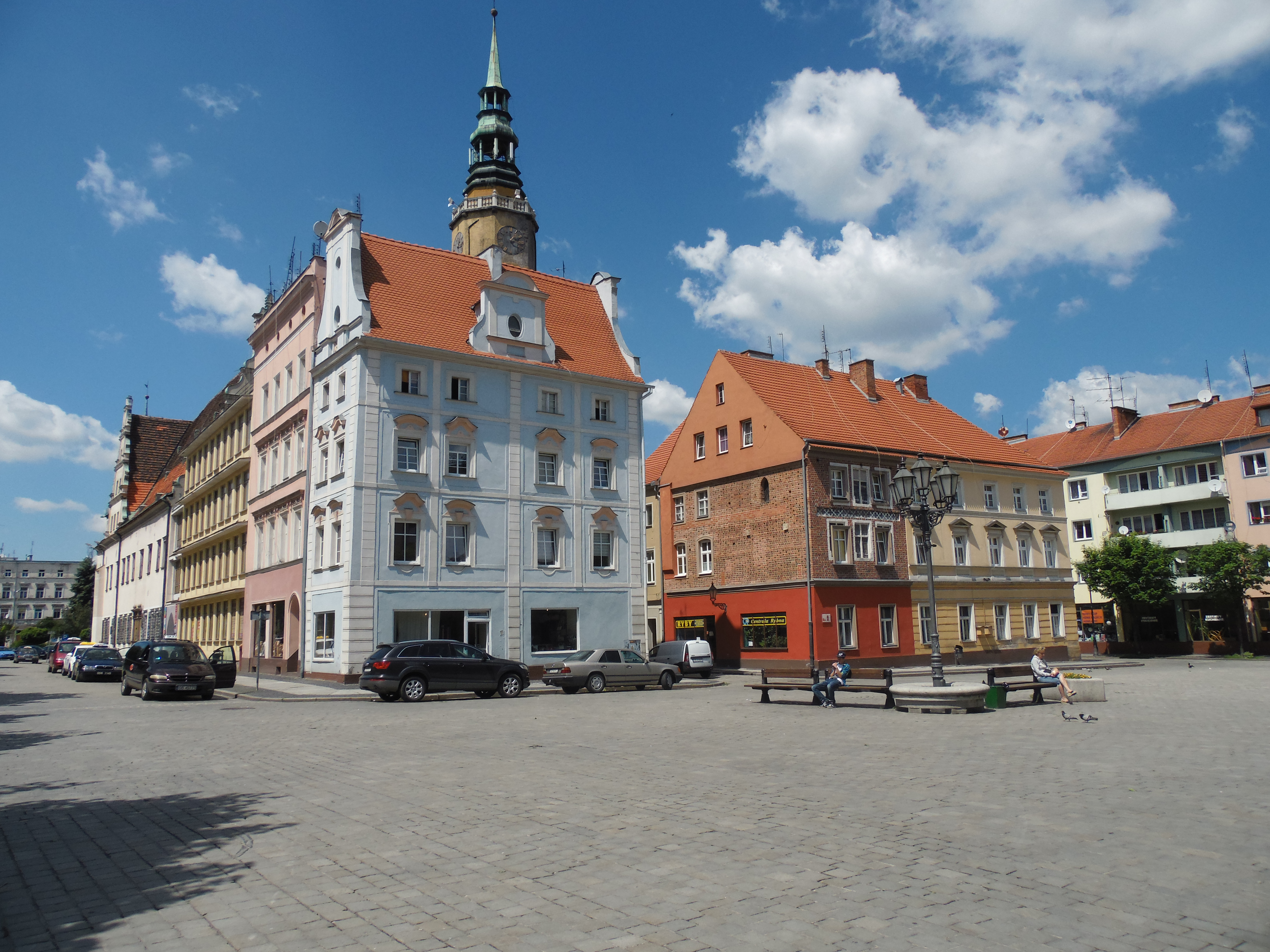
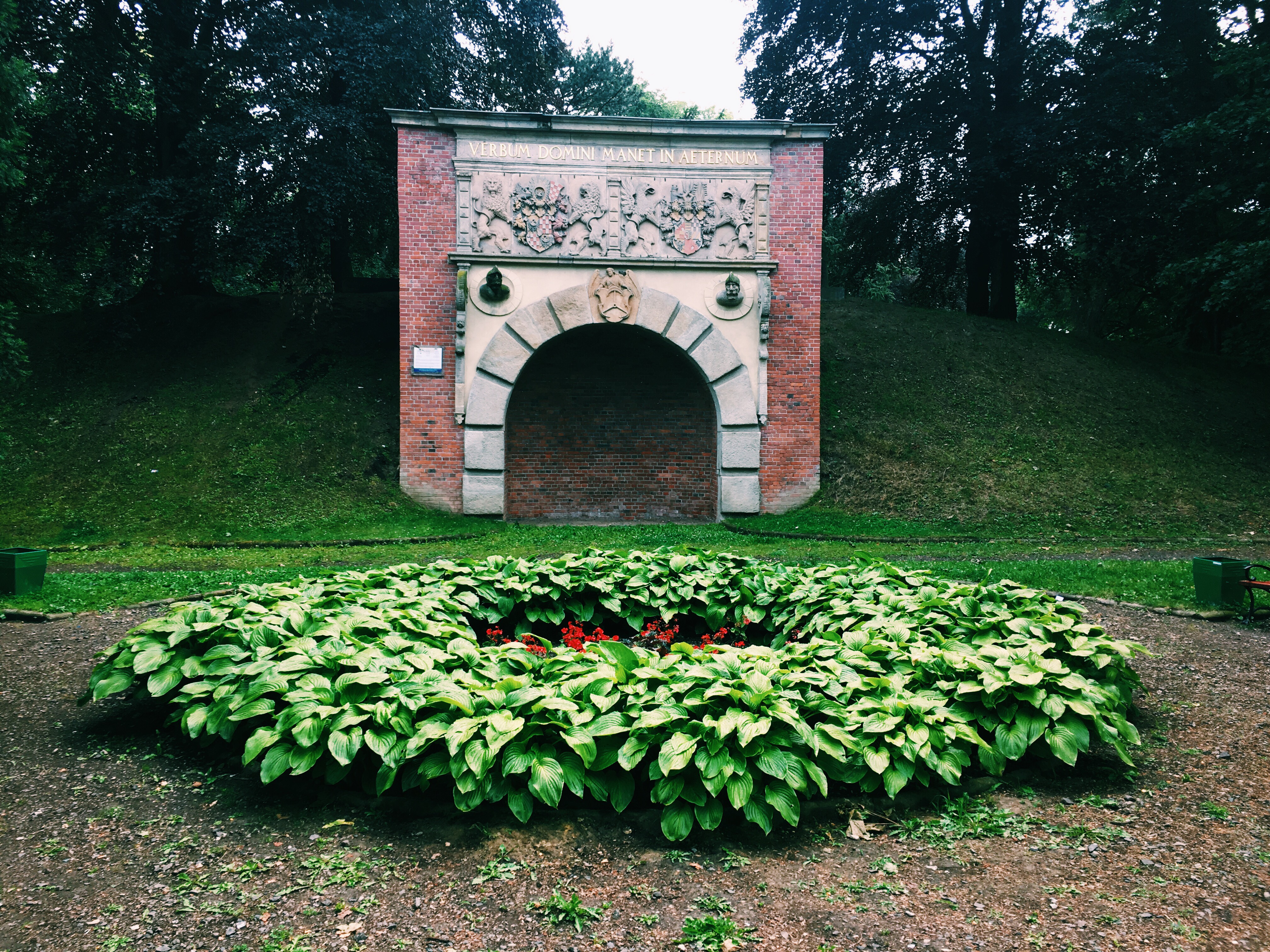
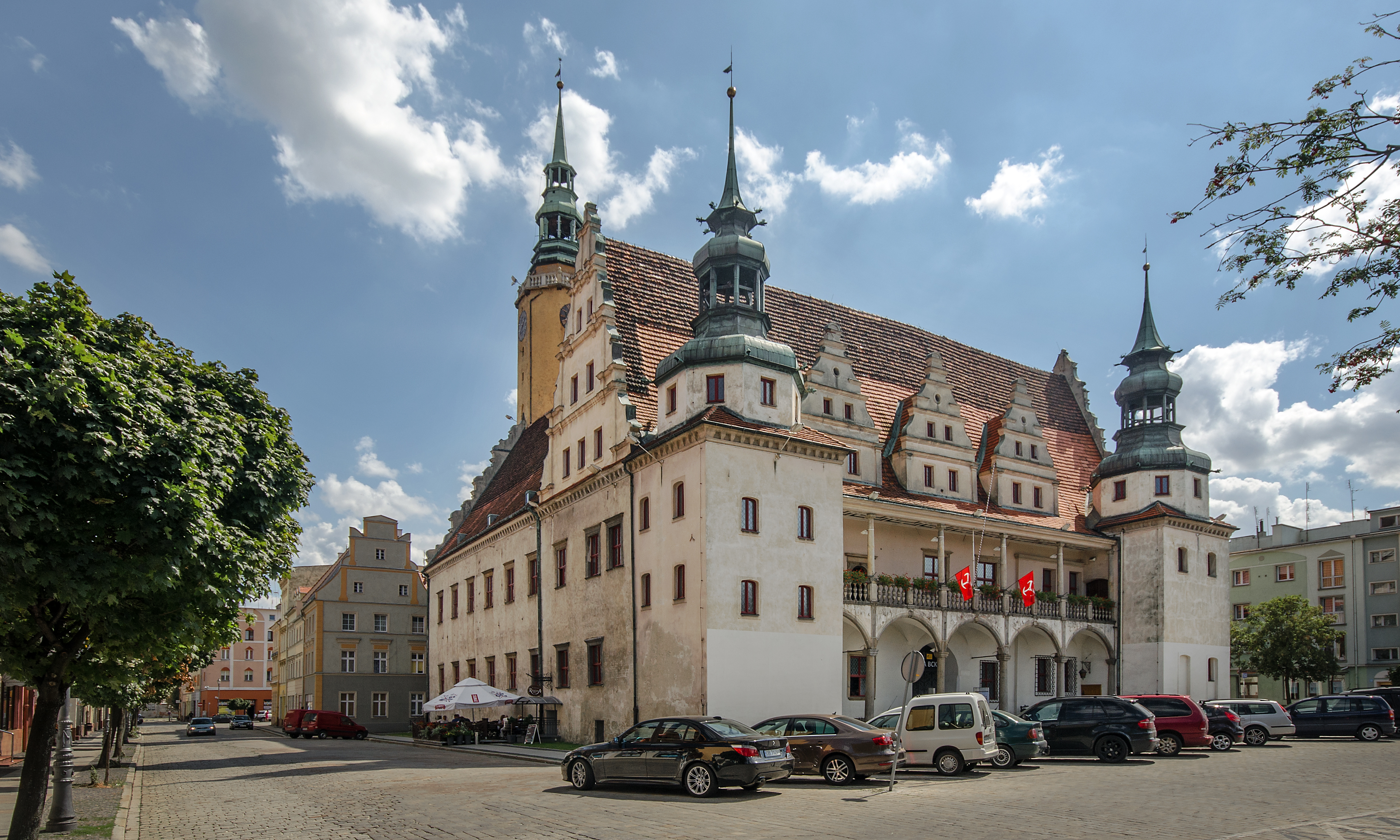
- Brzeg Castle Market Square Odrzańska Gate Town Hall

- Flag Coat of arms
- Nickname: The Garden Town; Miasto Ogrodów
- Location within Poland
- Coordinates: 50°52′N 17°29′E
- Country: Poland
- Voivodeship: Opole
- County: Brzeg
- Gmina: Brzeg (urban gmina)
- Town rights: 1248

Government
  - Mayor: Violetta Jaskólska-Palus

Area
  - Total: 16.0 km^{2} (6.2 sq mi)
- Elevation: 150 m (490 ft)

Population (31 December 2024)
  - Total: 33,101
  - Density: 2,070/km^{2} (5,360/sq mi)
- Demonym: Brzeżan
- Time zone: UTC+1 (CET)
  - Summer (DST): UTC+2 (CEST)
- Postal code: 49-300
- Vehicle registration: OB
- Website: https://brzeg.pl

Brzeg ([bʐɛk]; Latin: Alta Ripa; German: Brieg; Silesian German: Brigg; Silesian: Brzeg, Brzyg; Czech: Břeh) is a town in southwestern Poland with 34,778 inhabitants (December 2021) and the capital of Brzeg County. It is situated in Silesia in the Opole Voivodeship on the left bank of the Oder river.

The town of Brzeg was first mentioned as a trading and fishing settlement within fragmented Piast-ruled Poland in 1234. In 1248, Silesian Duke Henry III the White granted the settlement Magdeburg town rights and by the late 13th century the city became fortified. Sometimes referred to as "the garden town", the town's size greatly expanded after the construction of dwellings which were located on the city outskirts. From the early 14th to late 17th centuries, the town was ruled by the Piast dynasty as fiefs of the Bohemian Crown within the Holy Roman Empire. Due to the result of the Silesian Wars, the town passed to Prussia and later was part of Germany between 1871 and 1945, before becoming once again part of Poland.

== Etymology ==
In older documents, Brzeg was referred to as Civitas Altae Ripae, meaning 'city on the high banks' of the Oder River; its name is derived from Polish brzeg 'shore'. Konstanty Damrot (1841–1895), in his book of the etymology of Silesian localities, states that in a Latin document from 1234 the settlement's name was Visoke breg (Polish: Wysokibrzeg, German: Wissokembreghe; literally 'high bank').

A native or resident of Brzeg is known as a brzeżan, brzeżanin (male), brzeżanka (female), brzeżanie and brzeżaninie (plural).

== History ==
=== Prehistory ===
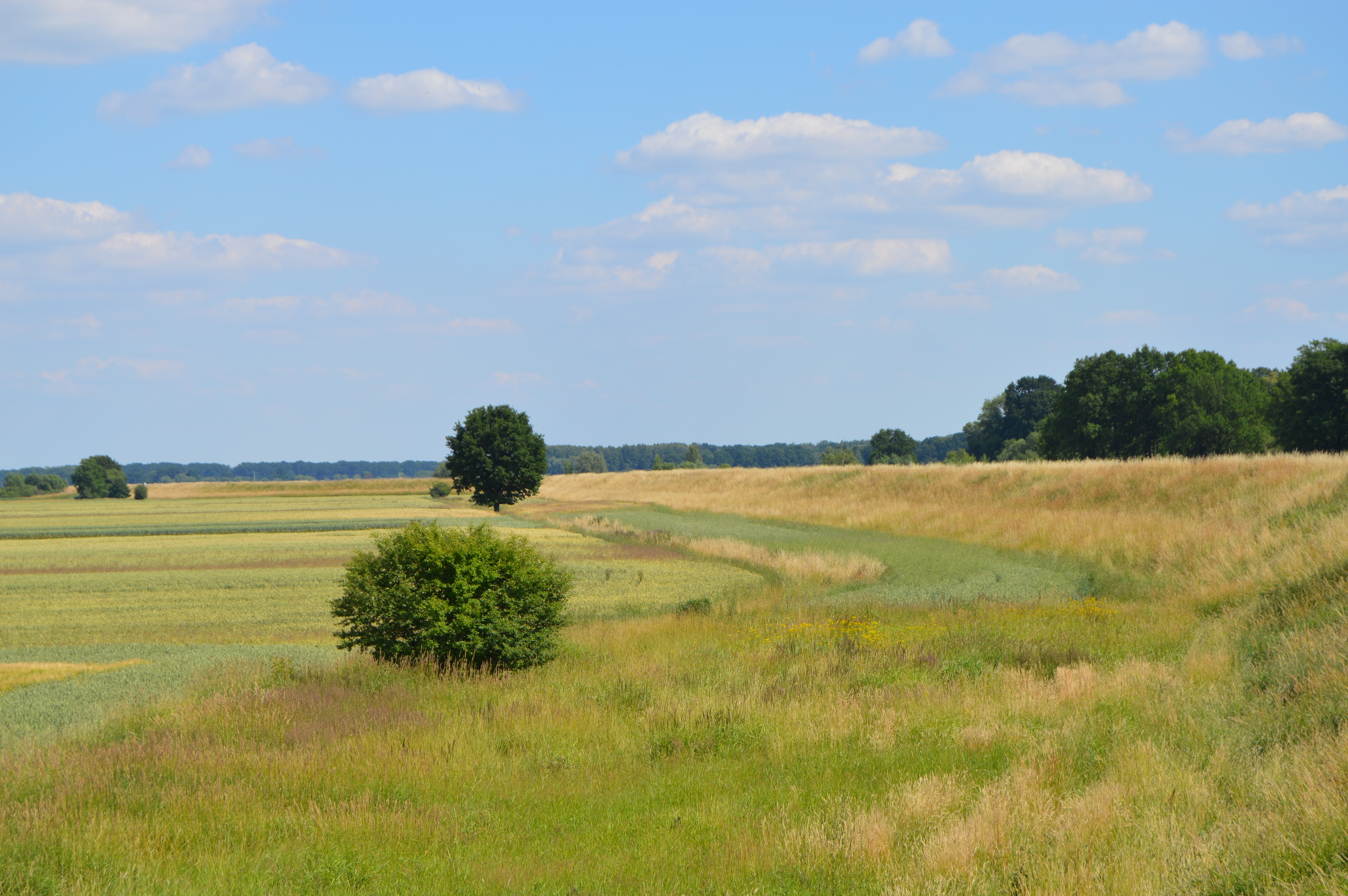
Agricultural fields to the north of Brzeg

The locality in and around present-day Brzeg has been settled by people since the Mesolithic era, with the earliest signs of settlement between 8000 and 4200 BC, as concluded from archaeological findings in Myślibórz, Kościerzyce, Lubsza and Lipki. The early human populace left behind traces of lithic flakes, flint flakes and other flint related tools. The earliest signs of agriculture come around during the Neolithic Era (4200–1700 BC). The Neolithic culture developed agriculture and domesticated farm animals; this lifestyle led Nomadic cultures to settle in the locality. The era saw the development of weaving, pottery and mining in the Brzeg Plain, with archaeological finds in Brzeg, Buszyce, Prędocin, Lewin Brzeski, Małujowice, Lipki, Myśliborze, Mąkoszyce and Obórki.

The time period of 1300–700 BC bears the existence of the Lusatian culture of the late Bronze Age and the early Iron Age. The culture settled in the region and in large continued to develop agriculture and the domestication of farm animals. The natural economy of the culture was based on weaving, pottery and metal works. The Lusatian culture's populace that inhabited the Brzeg Lands was identified by archaeological excavations, revealing 17 individual localities, including 3 hamlets and 8 burial sites, namely a fortified wooden settlement in Rybna and an open-pit crematory in Pisarzowice (with 30 discovered burial sites).

To follow the Lusatian culture, which witnessed its decline around 500 BC, were the Celts, around 400–300 BC in Silesia, as identified with archaeological findings in Lubsza and Pawłów (located in the eastern vicinity of Brzeg). Around 100 BC, the peoples of Silesia (Celtic and Germanic tribes) began trading with the Roman Empire, as evidenced through the findings of Roman currency in the locality. In the 7th century Slavic peoples started settling in the region. At the same time Iron tools and blacksmith-based hamlets found in Kantorowice and Pępice are evidenced for the first time in this region.

=== Early Middle Ages ===
The period of AD 500–1000 saw the establishment of the early feudal system in Silesia. The era was characteristic of the establishment of gord settlements, towns and the continued development of trade and crafts. It is believed the permanent populace around modern-day Brzeg was set up by Silesian tribes. The first mention of the Silesian tribes is made in the mid-ninth-century document known as the Bavarian Geographer (Latin: Geographus Bavarus), which included the Silesian gord of Ryczyn, located 8.3 kilometres (5.2 mi) north-west of Brzeg, in the eastern Oława County. The Ryczyn gords became the main line of defence for the Silesians, namely to protect the river trade routes along the Oder river and the land trade route between Ryczyn (the locality's administrative centre, home to a castellan) and Brzeg (being some 10 kilometres (6.2 mi) in length). The importance of the Ryczyn gords is demonstrated by Henry V of the Holy Roman Empire's army halting their advancement before the gords in 1109.

Between the ninth and early-tenth century, the Brzeg Lands, together with all of Silesia, were part of Great Moravia until its demise in AD 906, after which, until 990 the region was under the rule of the Premyslids.

=== Medieval Poland ===
Around 990, Silesia was incorporated into Mieszko I's Poland. During the Fragmentation of Poland (1138 – c. 1314), the area of the Brzeg Lands, along with the rest of Silesia, came under the control of King of Poland, Bolesław III Wrymouth's oldest son, Władysław II the Exile.

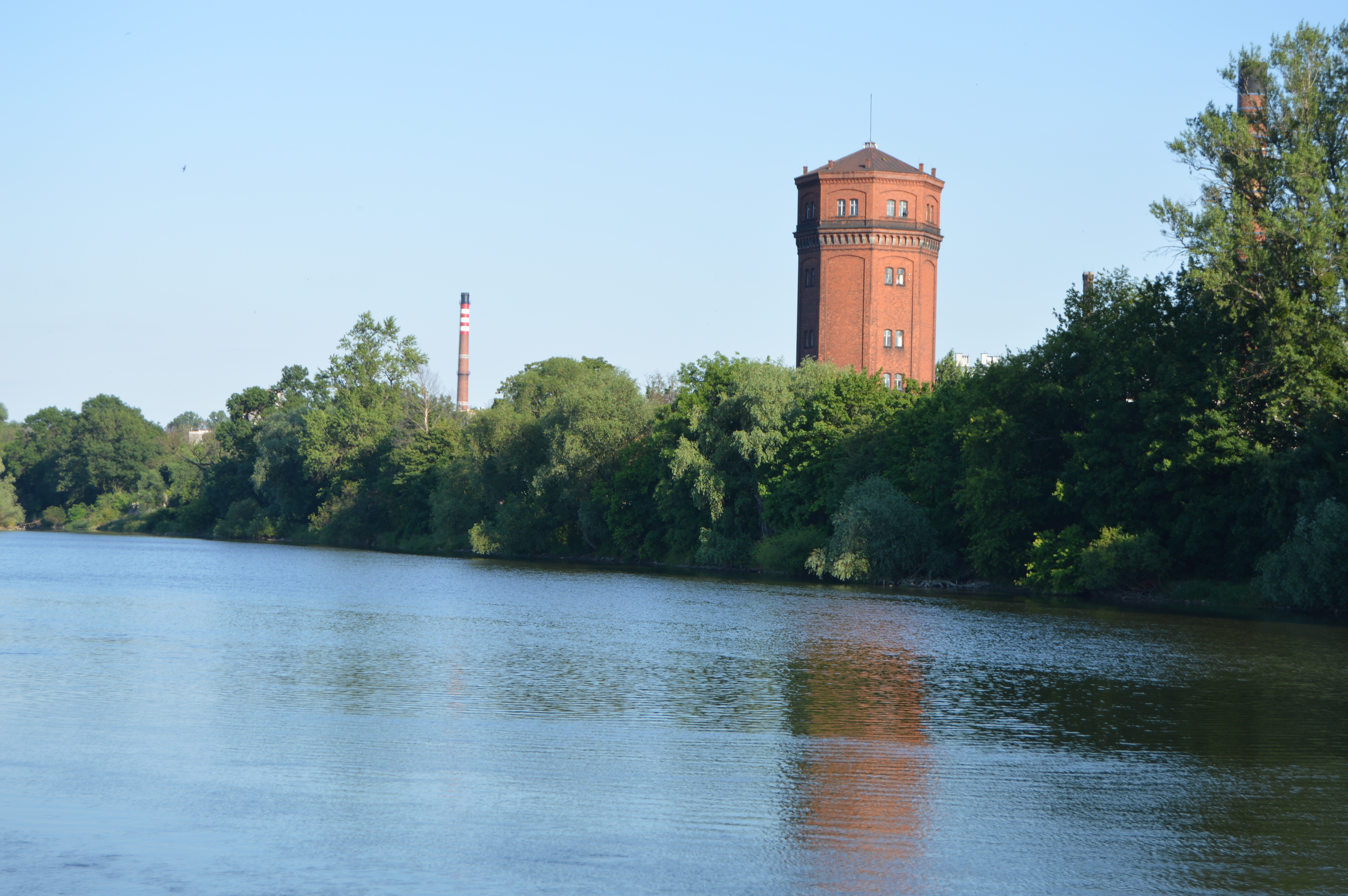
View towards the present-day ul. Rybacka with the town's water tower

The most favourable area for the settlement of Brzeg is located between the Castle Square (Plac Zamkowy), with elevated ground extending south-east towards the Square of the American Polonia (Plac Polonii Amerykańskiej). Before the town's foundation, three separate settlements existed in its modern-day territory, with "Wysoki Brzeg" (Alta ripa) bearing the main administrative role in the region. Between the late-twelfth and early-thirteen century, the Dukes of Wrocław set up a curia, led by a claviger. In 1235, Henry the Bearded occupied the area around Oława, by which Walloons had to turn over a tribute of 1 scale of grain and of oat to the settlement of Brzeg, suggesting the existence of a granary and other outbuildings in the curia's established headquarters.

Some two hundred m south-west from the curia was the former location, on what was later to be called Mary's Hill (Góra Marii), of the Romanesque St. Mary's Church (Kościół Najświętszej Marii Panny). During the Reformation, the church was deconstructed, and its brickwork used for the construction of the town's fortifications. A sixteenth-century chronicle states it was "the first church", however, no more is known about the holy site. Historians believe the founder of the church may have been Bolesław I the Tall or Henry the Bearded. Around the peripheries of the settlement was the location of several hospital buildings. Towards the route to Wrocław in the town's west was the location of the Hospital of the Holy Ghost (Świętego Ducha), used both to cure the town's dwellers and as an inn for travellers along the Wrocław-Opole route the town of Brzeg was located in the middle of, with an average walking distance between each town taking one day. The area around the Holy Ghost Hospital, present-day Moniuszko Square (Plac Moniuszki), was the location of a major market, positioned by the cross roads of the Wrocław–Nysa route, east of the Wrocławska Gate. By the end of the thirteenth century, the Duke of Brzeg possessed 10 shambles. The market is believed to be characteristic of other Silesian towns, commonly selling agricultural produce, namely bread, meat and shoes. Prior to the locality receiving its town charter in 1248 or 1250, the settlement had characteristics of a town and not of an ordinary fishing village, being referred to as "civitas" in an early Latin document, as exemplified by the existence of the curia, church and a major market, allowing the settlement to develop through the exchange of produce and barter.

Prior to Brzeg receiving its town charter, the Duke of Wrocław, Henry III the White, received the settlement of Małkowice, (present-day Kępa Młyńska), in exchange of his feudal rights over Zębice (south-west from Oława). The fishermen living in Małkowice (present-day ul. Rybacka), in accordance to ancient Polish law were charged with the task of protecting the Ducal Castle along the riverside. By the turn of the thirteenth century, the defenceless populace living in the pastures of the Brzeg Plain began to relocate into the fortified Visoke breg, building up a new osiedle around the present-day streets of: Łokietka, Piastowska and Trzech Kotwic (extending south-east). The osiedle was documented as Stary Brzeg (Antiqua Brega; Alt Brieg), to be renamed Wieś Brzeska: Brygischedorf (c. 1329) and villa Bregensis in c. 1339. To the west of the fortified centre of Brzeg, the settlement of Rataje (a separate village until 1975) as the former village's etymology suggests, centered around the upkeep of the ducal pastures.

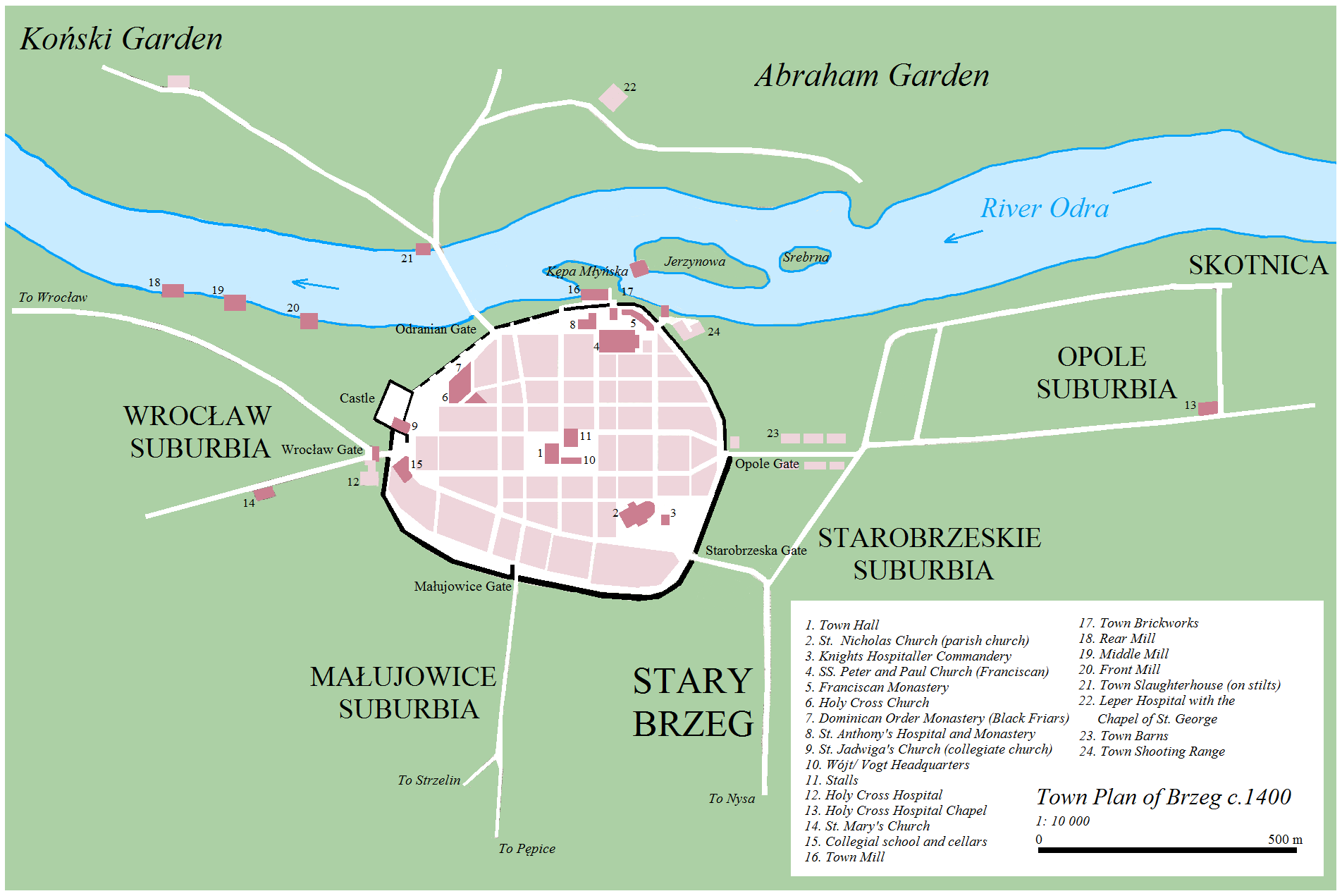
Brzeg town plan, c. 1400

The town received German town law in 1250 from the Wrocław Duke Henry III the White. The foundation was carried out by the three lokators, Gerkinus of Złotoryja, Ortlif and Heinrich of Reichenbach (Dzierżoniów). From the emblem of Heinrich of Reichenbach the town also got its coat of arms. While in power, Henry III, granted the town (by a singular payment) the forest around the locality of Lubsza. His successor, Henryk IV the Righteous regulated the town's church affairs, as well as renouncing his patronage over St. Mary's Church (Kościół Św. Marii Panny), located west of the town's western boundary. The church was granted to the Order of Saint John, subsequently founding the Church of St. Nicholas in 1292. The town was fortified in 1297.

From 1311 to 1675 Brzeg was the capital of a Lower Silesian duchy (Duchy of Brzeg) ruled by a local line of the Polish Piast dynasty, one of whom built a castle in 1341. The Duchy became a fief of the Kingdom of Bohemia in 1329. The town was burned by the Hussites in 1428 and soon afterwards rebuilt.

=== Early modern period ===
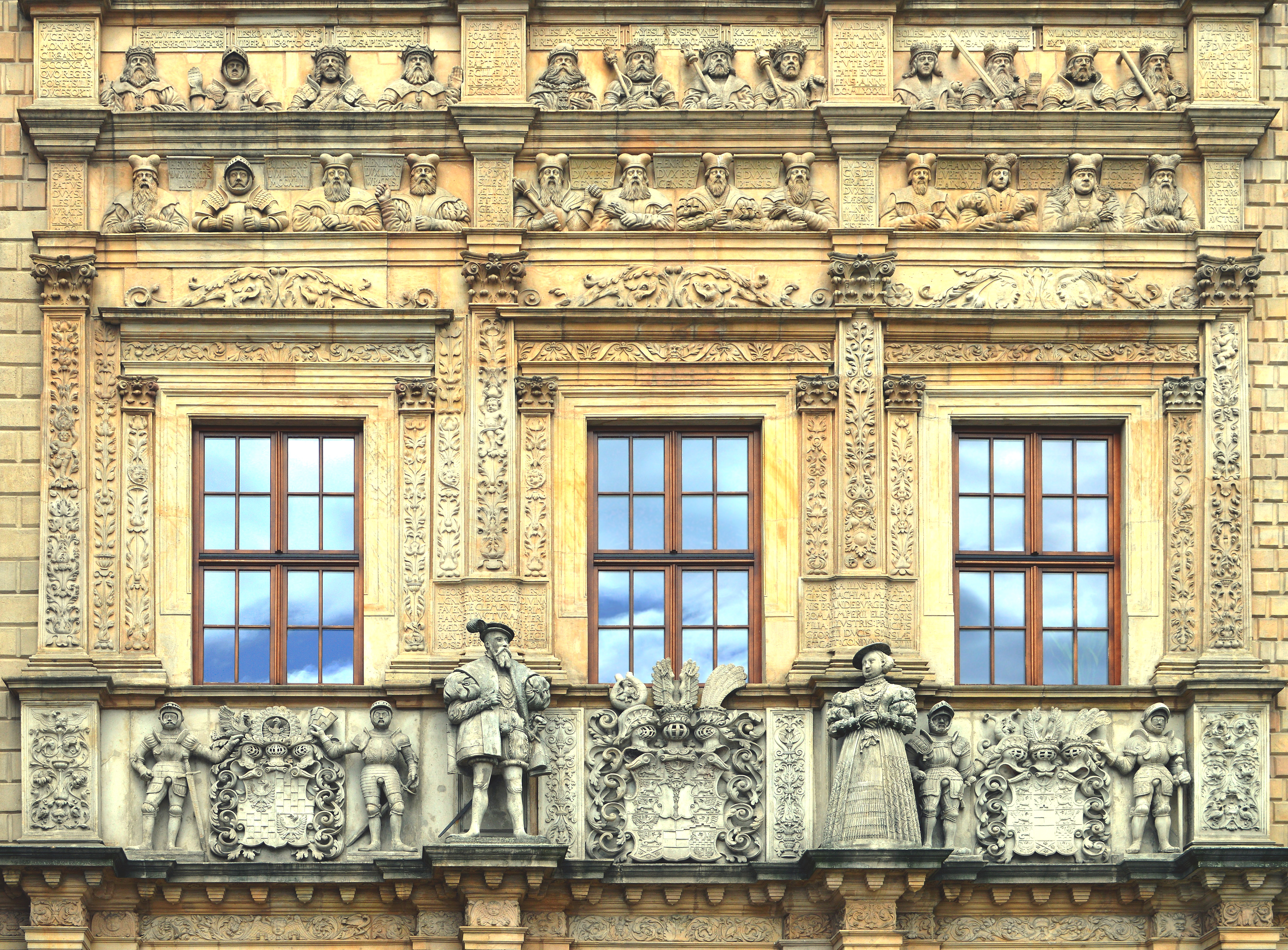
Renaissance facade of the Brzeg Castle, depicting members of the Piast dynasty, from the semi-legendary founder Piast the Wheelwright to Duke Frederick II of Legnica

At the beginning of the 16th century there were two schools in Brzeg, a collegiate and a municipal school, both influenced by the scientific, cultural and literary currents of the University of Kraków. In 1529 Duke Frederick II of Legnica, in attempt to establish the town as a significant learning center, merged the two schools, but the town council, wanting to maintain control over the municipal school, led to the two being split again in 1534.

The town continued to flourish under the reign of Duke George II. George II maintained close contacts with the Polish–Lithuanian Commonwealth and its nobility, and rebuilt the Ducal Castle in Renaissance style, built the Renaissance town hall, established a new mausoleum of the Piast dukes and built a new gymnasium, opened in 1569. The libraries of the old schools were merged into the newly named Piast Library. The gymnasium became popular among Polish nobility, whose children were often educated there. Among the graduates were Polish Royal secretary and poet Joachim Bielski and reformer Samuel Hartlib, co-founder of the Royal Society of London.

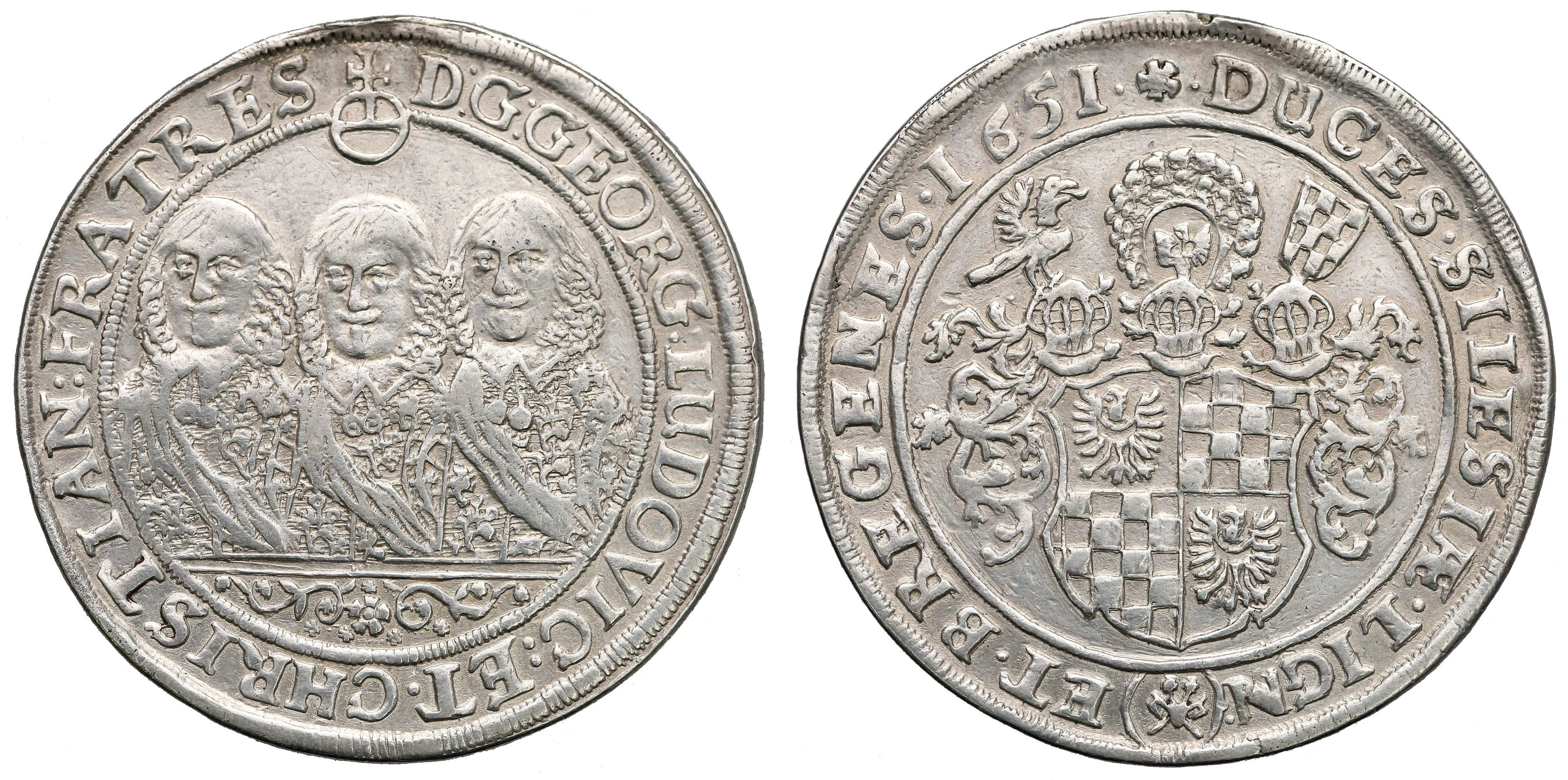
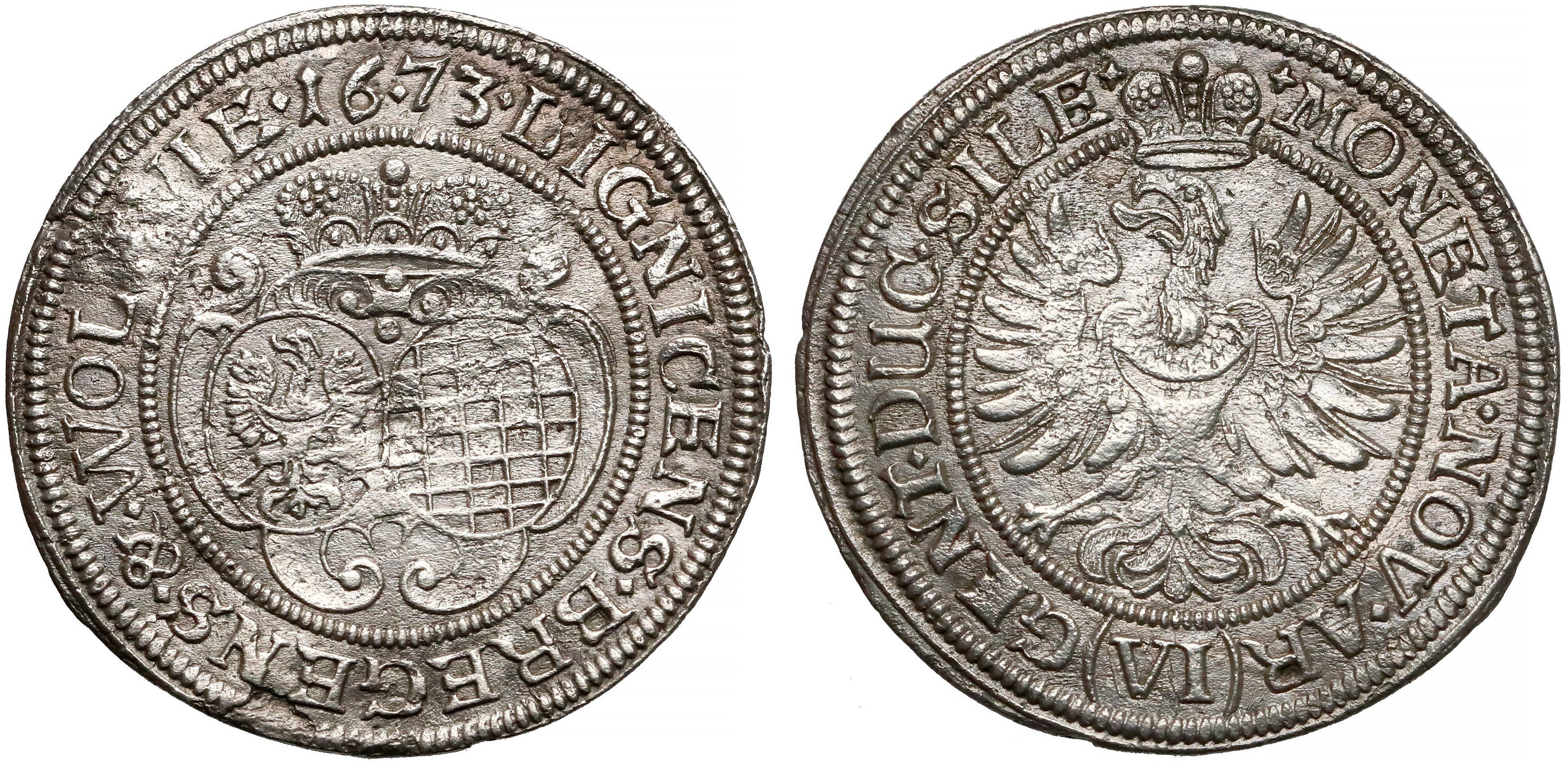
17th-century coins from the local mint

In 1595 Brieg was again fortified by Joachim Frederick of Brieg and Liegnitz. In the Thirty Years' War it suffered greatly; in the War of the Austrian Succession it was heavily bombarded by the Prussian forces. When Bohemia fell to the Habsburg monarchy of Austria in 1526, the town fell under the overlordship of the Habsburgs in their roles of Kings of Bohemia, although it was still ruled locally by the Silesian Piasts. Upon the extinction of the last duke George William of Legnica in 1675, Brieg came under the direct rule of the Habsburgs.

In 1537 Duke Frederick II of Legnica concluded a treaty with Elector Joachim II of Brandenburg, whereby the Hohenzollerns of Brandenburg would inherit the duchy upon the extinction of the Silesian Piasts. On the death of George William the last duke in 1675, however, Austria refused to acknowledge the validity of the treaty and annexed the duchies and Frederick the Great of the Kingdom of Prussia used this treaty to justify his claim at the invasion of Silesia during the War of the Austrian Succession in 1740. Brieg and most of Silesia were annexed by Prussia in 1741 during the First Silesian War. The Siege of Brieg (11 April – 4 May 1741) resulted in the surrender of the 2,000-man Austrian garrison led by Ottavio Piccolomini to 6,000 Prussians commanded by Frederick the Great. The 1,800 surviving Austrians were allowed free passage to the fortress of Nysa (Neisse).

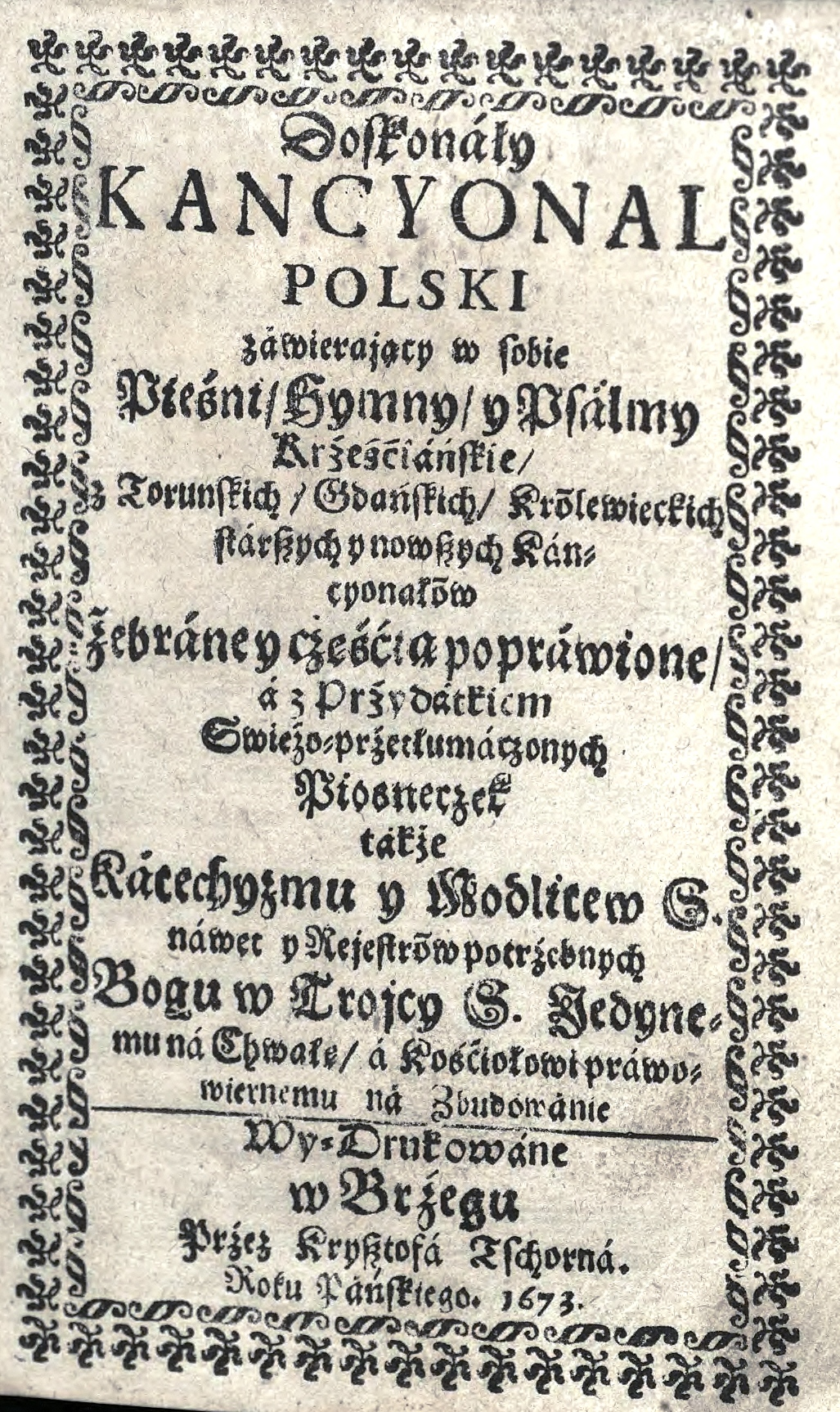
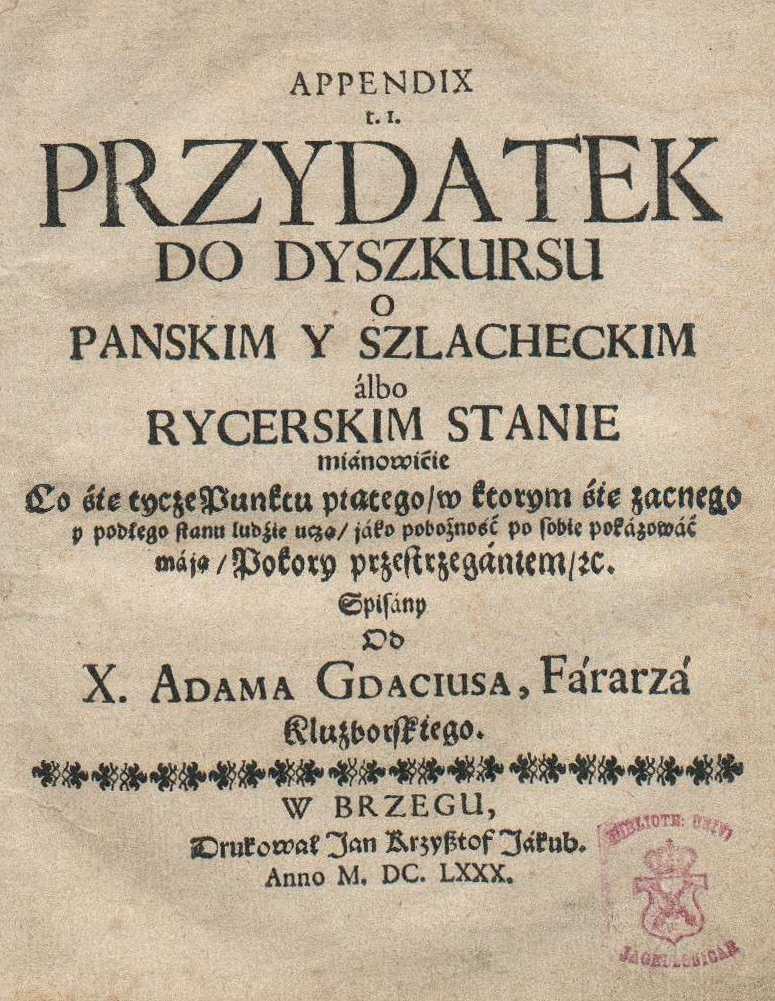
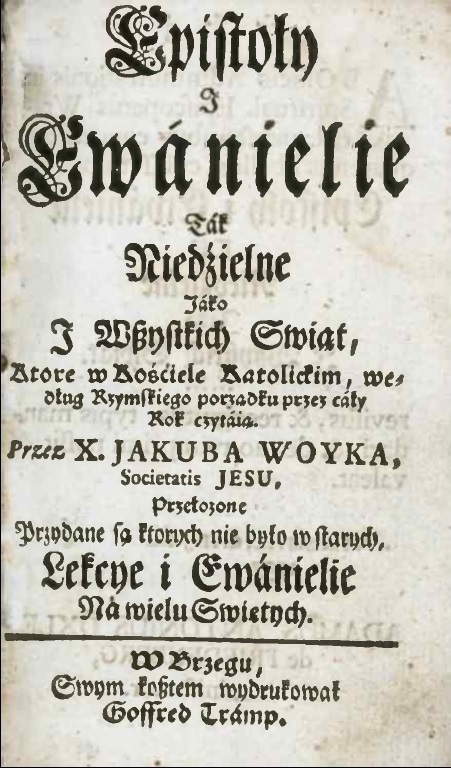
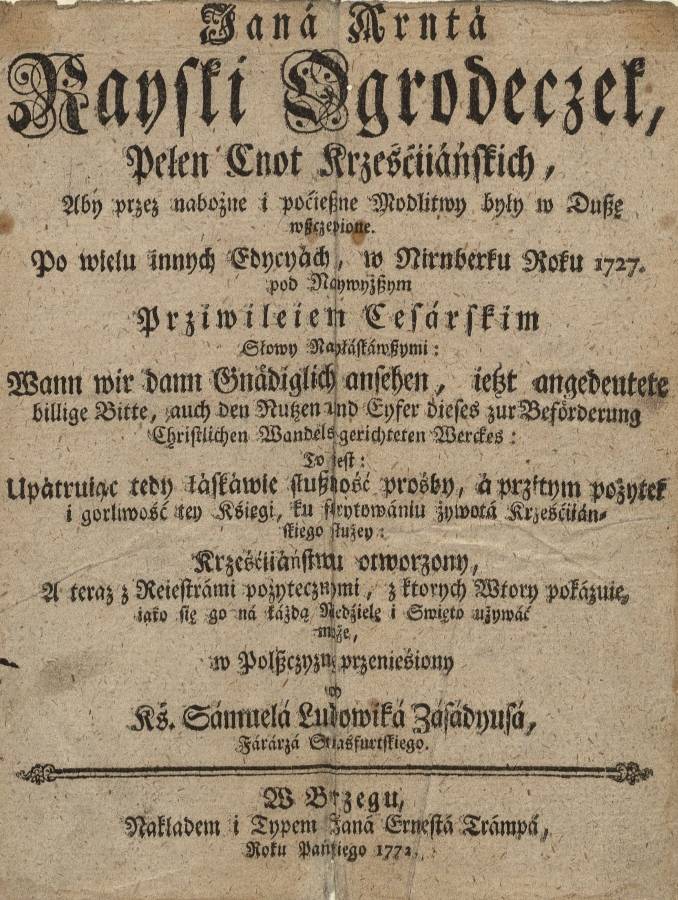
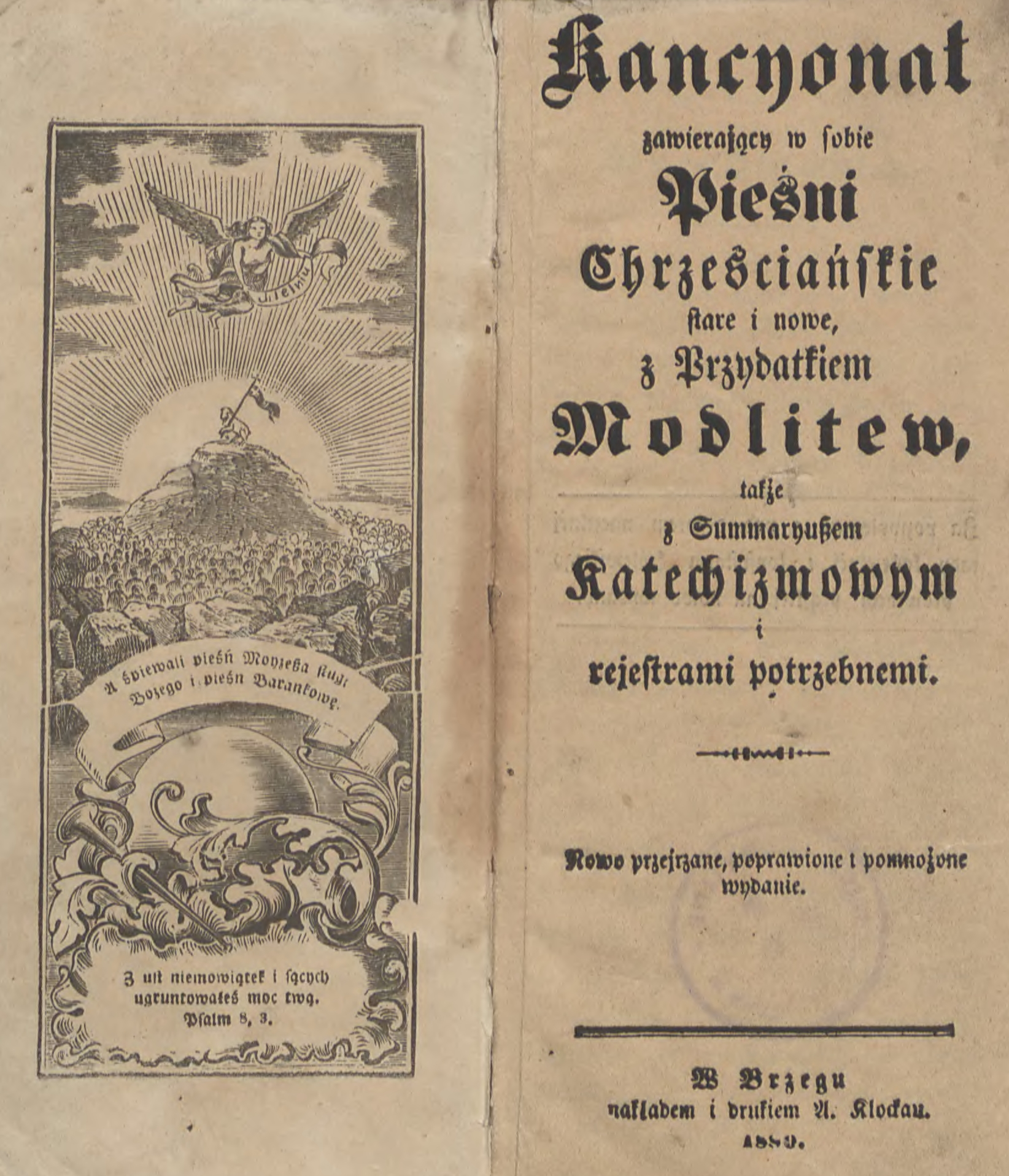
Examples of Polish books published in Brzeg in 1673–1889

=== Late modern and contemporary ===
During the Napoleonic Wars, in 1807, it was captured by French forces. In 1807 the town's fortifications were pulled down by Napoleon's army. The Prussian Province of Silesia, and thus Brieg, consequently became part of the German Empire when it was proclaimed in 1871 on the unification of Germany. Despite Austrian, Prussian and German rule, the town was an important Polish printing center in the region.

During World War II, the Germans operated two Nazi prisons with three forced labour subcamps in the town and a fourth subcamp in Bielawa. In early 1945, some prisoners were sent on a death march to Kłodzko. 202 Polish citizens were murdered by Nazi Germany in the town during the war. During the war, 60% of Brieg was destroyed and many of the town's inhabitants died during the severe winter of 1944–5 as they fled from the advancing Red Army. The war had brought the most severe destruction to the town in its entire history. Some of the town's population was evacuated by the German Army who moved its population further west inside Germany for safety and declared Brieg a fortress. After the fall of the town to the Soviets the remaining German population was expelled. The town, under the historic Polish name Brzeg became once again part of Poland and was repopulated by Poles whom Soviets expelled from the eastern part of interwar Poland.

=== Garrison history ===
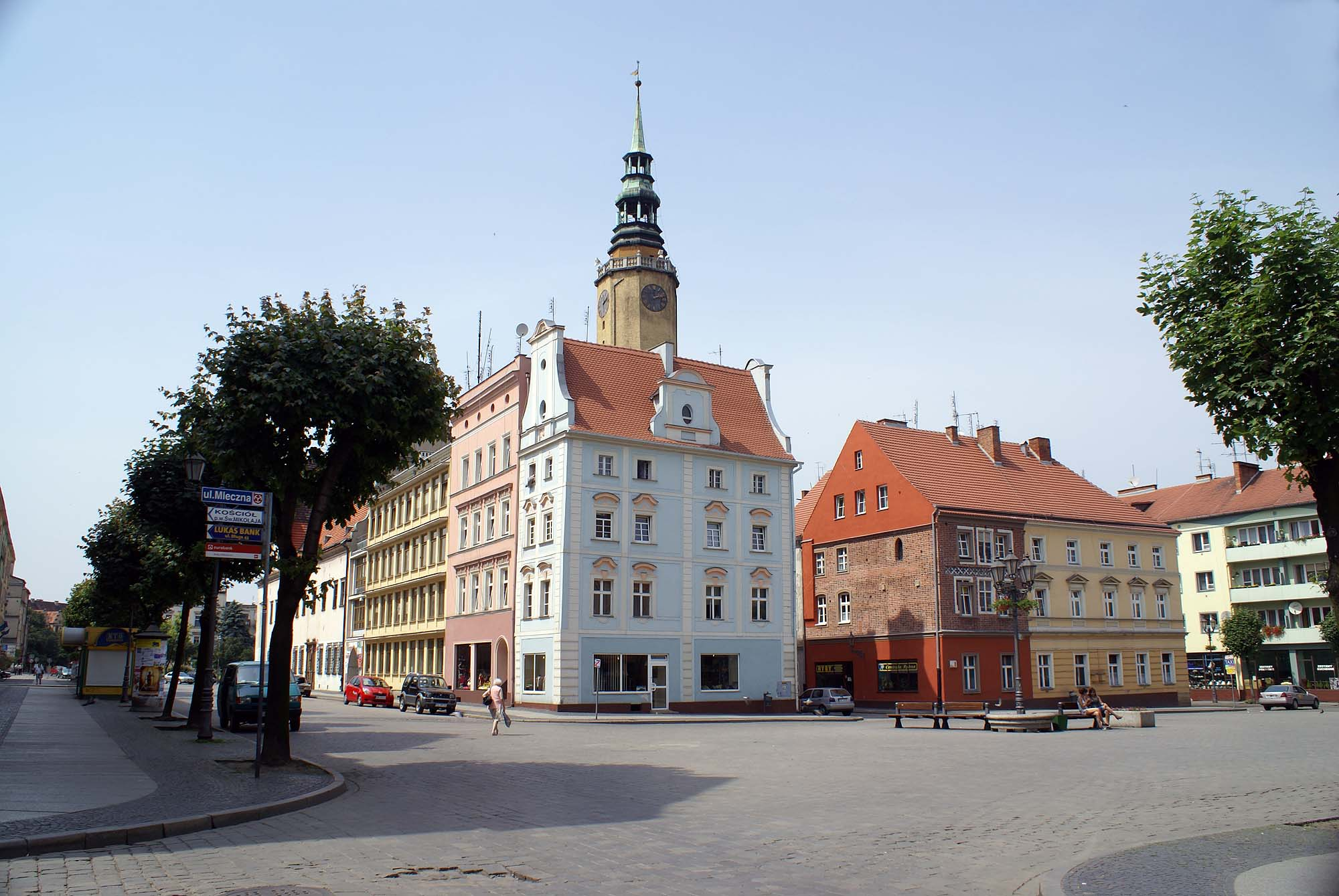
Market Square in Brzeg

From the late 19th century the then German town of Brieg had expanded into a traditional military garrison town, from 1897 until 1919 it was the home town base to Infantry Regiment No. 157 designated from 1902 the 4th Silesian Infantry Regiment No. 157 (4. Schlesisches Infanterie-Regiment Nr. 157) of the Royal Prussian Army and respectively the Imperial German Army. In 1914 under the regiment's last peacetime commander Lieutenant General Paul Tiede the regiment began mobilizing for the Western Front at the outbreak of World War I as part of VI Army Corps (VI. Armee-Korps), 12th Division (12. Division), 78th Infantry Brigade (78. Infanterie-Brigade).

Map of the town of Brzeg, 1928

At the end of World War I the garrison barracks at Brieg remained for some years after without a stationed military regiment. The Imperial German Army Air Arm (Luftstreitkräfte) military aerodrome (Fliegerhorst) found in nearby Grüningen was furthermore dismantled and destroyed as part of the Treaty of Versailles. It was not until 4 August 1930 that the 5th Squadron of Cavalry Regiment No. 8 (5. Schwadron Reiterregiments Nr. 8) of the German Reichswehr arrived in Brieg from Breslau-Carlowitz, other cavalry squadrons from Militsch and Oels followed shortly after. This resulted in the garrison's Tiede-Barracks (named after Generalleutnant Paul Tiede) located in Moltke-, Sedan-, Roon- und Bismarckstraße requiring some alterations to accommodate the new arrival of horse-cavalry residents. It was from Brieg garrison, the German Cavalry Captain (Rittmeister) Konrad Freiherr von Wangenheim became famous for securing a Gold medal win at the 1936 Summer Olympics in Berlin for the German equestrian team whilst suffering from a broken collarbone. In 1933 an airfield located in nearby Hermsdorf was also built and thereby a much larger military aerodrome was established. The new aerodrome was occupied by Flight Reconnaissance Group 113 (Fliegeraufklärungsgruppe 113).

Towards the end of World War II, on 6 February 1945, the Soviet army captured Brzeg, which resulted in moderate destruction of the town's buildings and infrastructure. After Germany's defeat in the war, Brzeg became part of Poland. Since 1950 the reconstructed town has been a part of the Opole Voivodeship.

=== History of the Jewish population ===
As the town was situated on the commercial route to Wrocław, in which a colony of Jews had long resided, Jews settled there about 1324. The Jewish community of Brieg had its separate place of worship from early times. In 1358 Jews lent money to local noblemen and the duke of Brieg, Ludwig I, who granted the Jews freedom of movement in the duchy in that year. In the 14th century the Jews of Brzeg were persecuted on account of their usurious practices; one outbreak of such violence occurred in 1362. In 1392 it was claimed that all debts of the duke had been discharged by the payments to a Jew of Brieg (Jacob, the son of Moses), of a certificate of indebtedness. In 1398 the Brieg Jews bought a letter of protection from the duke, whereby they were guaranteed the peaceful possession of their privileges. But in 1401 they were driven from the city, except Jacob and Seman von Reichenbach, who had received a patent of protection from the duke's council for six years from May 1, 1399. In 1423, duke Ludwig II granted the Jews rights of residence on payment of an annual tax of 20 gulden, but they were expelled from the duchies of Brieg and Liegnitz in 1453 as a result of the inflammatory preachings of the Franciscan John Capistrano. Solomo, a capitalist, lent large sums of money to royal houses in the 15th century. In the 16th century, one of the local Jews served as a physician to the duke of Brieg.

With the decline of Breslau as a trade center, the Jews of Brieg became little more than an isolated community; and in modern times they shared the lot of the other Silesian Jews. They carried on insignificant trade operations as a rule. The conquest of Silesia by Frederick the Great brought but slight change in their condition.

A synagogue was built in Brieg in 1799, and a rabbi was first appointed in 1816. The Jewish population numbered 156 in 1785; 376 in 1843; 282 in 1913; 255 in 1933; and 123 in 1939. In the Kristallnacht pogroms of 1938 under Nazi Germany the interior of the synagogue was completely demolished and the Torah scrolls publicly burned; numerous shops were ransacked. During World War II, from 1940 to 1944, the Germans operated a forced labour camp for Jewish men in the town. The community was not reestablished after the Holocaust.

== Geography ==
=== Status ===
The shape of the town, including its neighbouring osiedla, is comparable to that of a deformed rectangle, elongated 3.54 kilometres (2.20 miles) north-south and 4.10 kilometres (2.55 miles) west-east. The area of the town, including the village of Rataje, which was incorporated into Brzeg on January 1, 1973, is some 16 km^{2} (6.2 sq mi). In comparison to Opole, with a total area of 48 km^{2} (19 sq mi); Nysa's 29 km^{2} (11 sq mi) and Kędzierzyn-Koźle's 23 km^{2} (8.9 sq mi); Brzeg is ranked fourth in the Opole Voivodeship by both population and area.

=== Topography ===
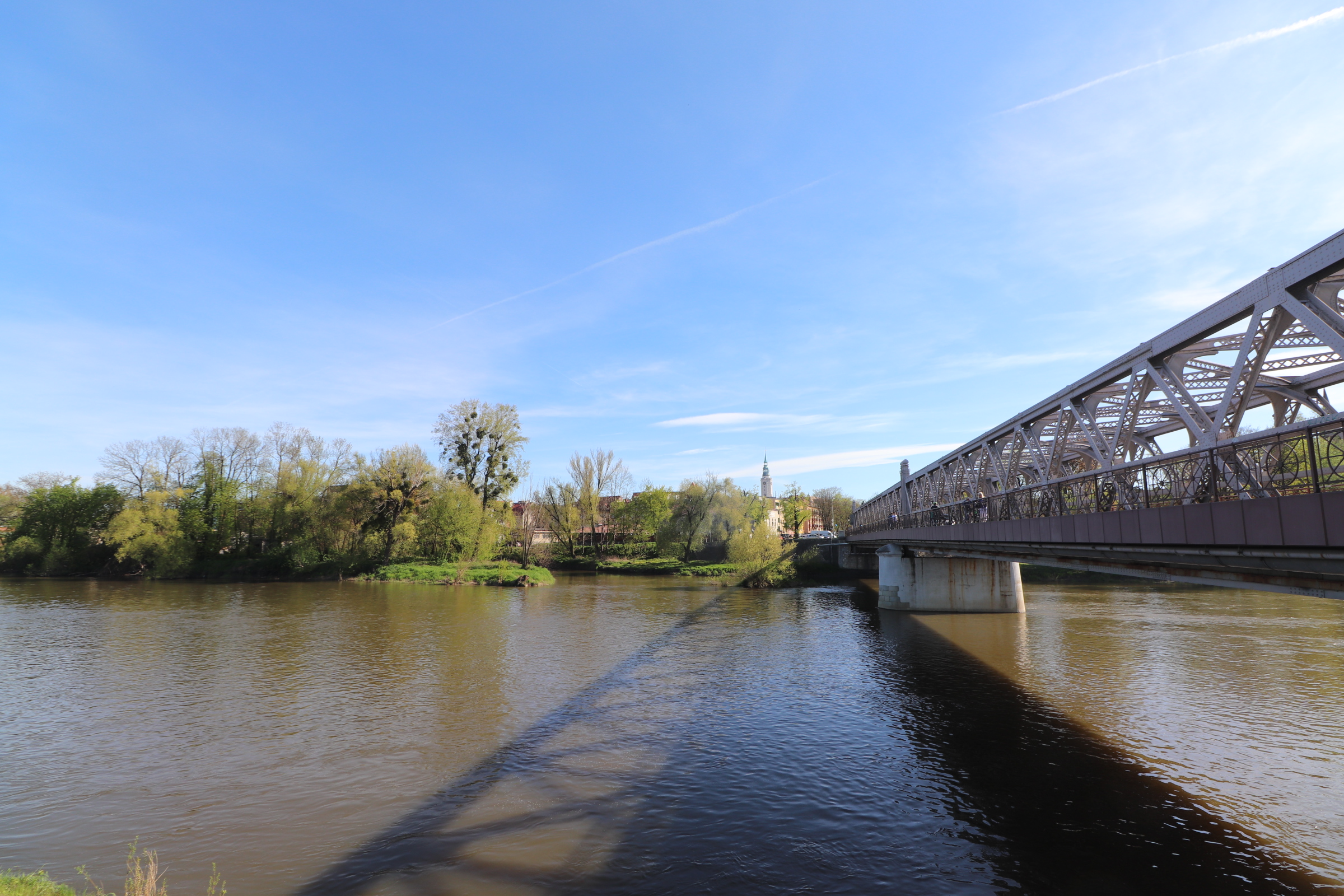
The Oder and the old town

Brzeg, as the regional capital of Brzeg County (Powiat Brzeski), is located in the west of the Opole Voivodeship, in the south-east of Poland. The settlement is located in the valley of the Oder, located between Opole 38.5 km to its east and Wrocław, 40.7 kilometres (25.3 miles) to its north-west. The town has a predominantly flat relief (in comparison to the river scarp on the eastern bank of the river). The River Oder, at low water levels (predominantly between June and early September) forms eyots north of Jerzynowa, Kępa and Srebrna Islands. The locality is located in the Brzeg Plain (Rownina Brzeska), part of the Silesian Lowlands. The Brzeg Plain's boundaries are outlined by the Oder river to its north, the Nysa Kłodzka Valley to its south-east, the hillocks of Grodków Hills and the Wawrzyszów Hills to its south. The western boundary of the Brzeg Plain is marked by the Oława Valley, along the Oder's mid-course.

The Brzeg Plain was formed by the Riss glaciation period (347,000 to 128,000 years ago), leaving behind remnants of a ground moraine from the last glacial period. The ground moraines have left two equally small hills, bearing characteristics of kames. The kames form the Łosiów Range (Wał Łosiowski), between the confluence of the River Nysa Kłodzka and the Oława Valley. Small streams, having their sources around the range, are fed directly into the Oder in the region of Nysa Kłodzka and Oława.

=== Climate ===
Climate data for Brzeg (1985–2015)
Month	Jan	Feb	Mar	Apr	May	Jun	Jul	Aug	Sep	Oct	Nov	Dec	Year
Mean daily maximum °C (°F)	2.0 (35.6)	4.0 (39.2)	9.0 (48.2)	15.0 (59.0)	20.0 (68.0)	22.0 (71.6)	25.0 (77.0)	25.0 (77.0)	20.0 (68.0)	15.0 (59.0)	8.0 (46.4)	3.0 (37.4)	14.0 (57.2)
Daily mean °C (°F)	−1.0 (30.2)	1.0 (33.8)	0.0 (32.0)	12.0 (53.6)	12.0 (53.6)	17.0 (62.6)	19.2 (66.6)	18.4 (65.1)	13.8 (56.8)	9.1 (48.4)	3.4 (38.1)	−0.7 (30.7)	8.7 (47.7)
Mean daily minimum °C (°F)	−3.0 (26.6)	−3.0 (26.6)	0.0 (32.0)	3.0 (37.4)	8.0 (46.4)	11.0 (51.8)	13.0 (55.4)	13.0 (55.4)	9.0 (48.2)	5.0 (41.0)	1.0 (33.8)	−2.0 (28.4)	4.5 (40.1)
Average precipitation mm (inches)	33 (1.3)	29 (1.1)	35 (1.4)	32 (1.3)	54 (2.1)	53 (2.1)	66 (2.6)	49 (1.9)	41 (1.6)	24 (0.9)	33 (1.3)	33 (1.3)	482 (19.0)
Average precipitation days	13.7	12.3	12.5	10.2	13.3	14.4	13.5	11.3	10.1	8.2	11.1	13.4	144
Mean monthly sunshine hours	74.4	62.4	98.4	151.2	168.0	132.0	196.8	204.0	192.0	189.6	117.6	79.2	1,665.6
Source: meteoblue.com

=== Settlement and trade ===
The settlement of Brzeg, historically located in the regional unit of Lower Silesia as opposed to Upper Silesia, is due to the formation of a "przesieka" ("clearing"). The "clearing" was a lateral formation, extending northerly from the former Sudetes Wildland to the southern foothills of the Sudetes Mountains. The clearing's characteristics set it as a point for defence in the Lower Silesia region, lined with barrages made out of cut down woodland. The Brzeg Plain was settled due to its fertile soil, allowing for the earliest forms of agriculture to develop in the locality. The locality was first settled by Silesian tribes and in later history, until 1675, by the Piast duchies of Duchy of Brzeg, Legnica and Wołów, united under the Duchy of Legnica-Wołów-Brzeg. Presently, the region is spotted with numerous towns, including Brzeg, Grodków and Strzelin, as well as villages, with agriculture providing the major source of income. The development of agriculture is met with a lack of forested areas, apart from the Stobrawa Landscape Park, located 7.2 km to the north of Brzeg and the Oder river. The Stobrawa woodland, agriculture and the Oder (as a form of transport) provided Brzeg the necessary diversity to remain the regional trade capital in Silesia.

Brzeg's geographical position between two trade routes, running from west to east (Legnica–Opole) and north to south (Gniezno–Nysa) and further on into the Kingdom of Bohemia, additionally stimulated the town's demographic and economic expansion. Brzeg is in modern times located between the European route E67 and E40.

== Environment ==
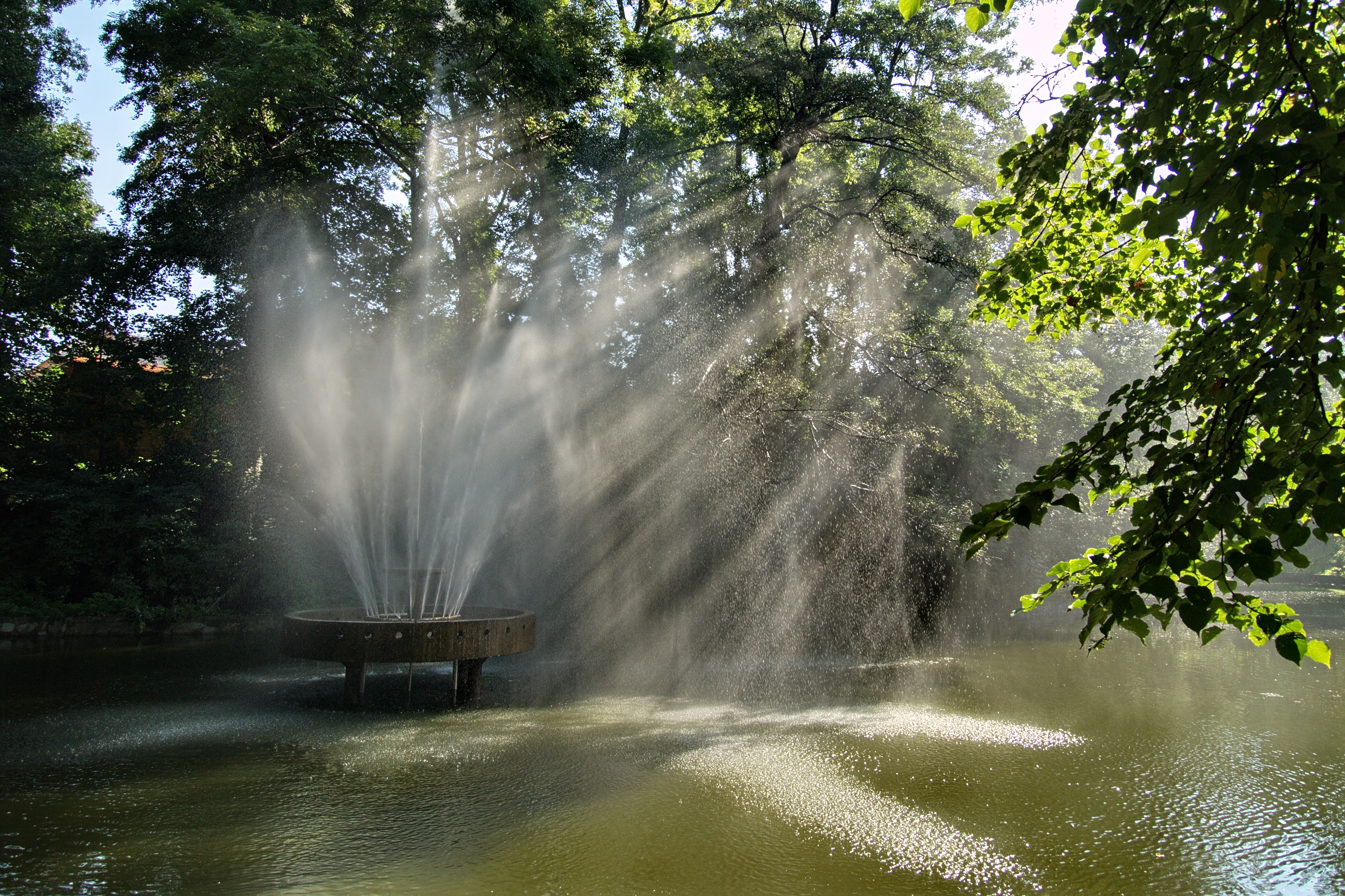
Central Park of J. Czajkowski (Park Centralny im. J. Czajkowskiego)

Brzeg has five public parks, three of which encircle the Old Town (Stare Miasto), after the area was transformed into parkland with the deconstruction of the garrison town's fortifications during the Napoleonic Wars in 1807. The parkland, surrounding the Old Town to its south, became known as the Planty. The Planty constitute of the Central Park of J. Czajkowski (Park Centralny im. J. Czajkowskiego), with a total area of 6.1 ha. The Central Park contains an artificial lake and a stream, connecting its waters to the western portion of the Planty, the Park nad Fosą. The Park by the Moat (Park nad Fosą), with a total area of 3.7 ha, is located south of the Silesian Piasts' Castle. The third and largest by area parkland surrounding the Old Town is located by the Oder river, the Odranian Park (Park Nadodrzański), with a total area of 10.9 ha. The castle, together with the town's fortification remnants, the Odrzańska Gate is located in the park.

The largest parkland in Brzeg, located in the south-west of the town is the Park of Juliusz Peppel (Park im. Juliusza Peppela) and formerly Liberty Park (Park Wolności) having a total area of 68.8 ha. The parkland was established after donations from the owners of Skarbimierz and the landed-elite family von Lobbecke donated the area to the town's authorities, to make way for a landscape park in the area. The smallest of the five public parks in Brzeg is the Park Ptasi, located in the south of the town, west of the osiedle of Westerplatte. The park has a total area of 1 ha.

== Demography ==
=== History ===
According to the Prussian census of 1905, the city of Brieg had a population of 27,486, of which 93% spoke German, 6% spoke Polish, and 1% were bilingual. After World War II, the town of Brzeg was part of the population transfers of the Soviet and Polish People's Republic's campaign to resettle Poles from Kresy (annexed by the USSR) to the newly regained territories by Poland from the defeated Germany, as part of the Potsdam Agreement. Per the agreement, the German population of Brzeg was expelled to either West or East Germany. The newly arrived population in Brzeg predominantly came from the countryside, being former peasants. The integration of the residents came in phases: education, communal work, marriages and the provision of material goods and items left behind by the former populace. By 1975, 37.9% of the population of Brzeg had settled in the town after 1960.

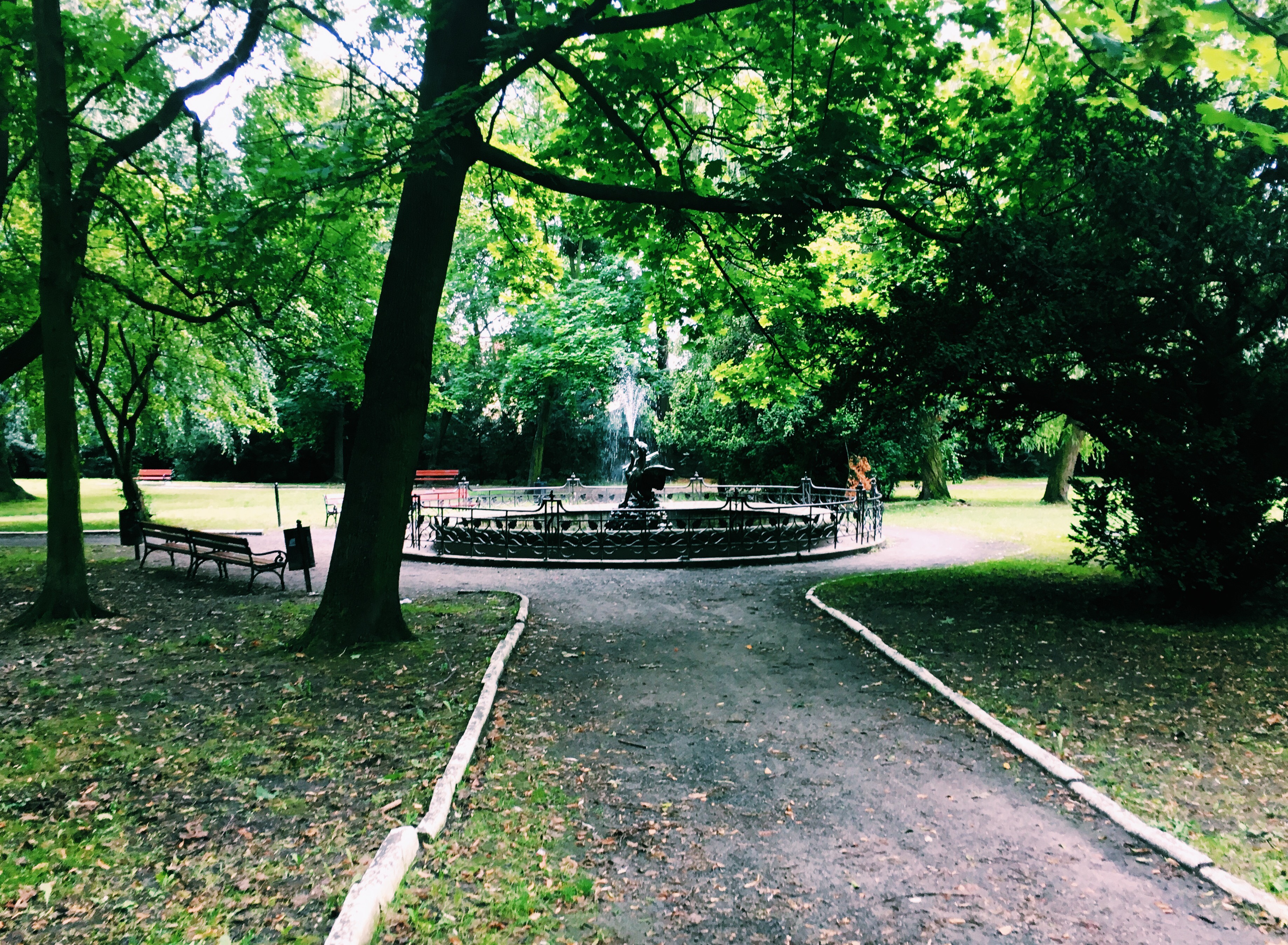
Central Park of J. Czajkowski (Park Centralny im. J. Czajkowskiego)

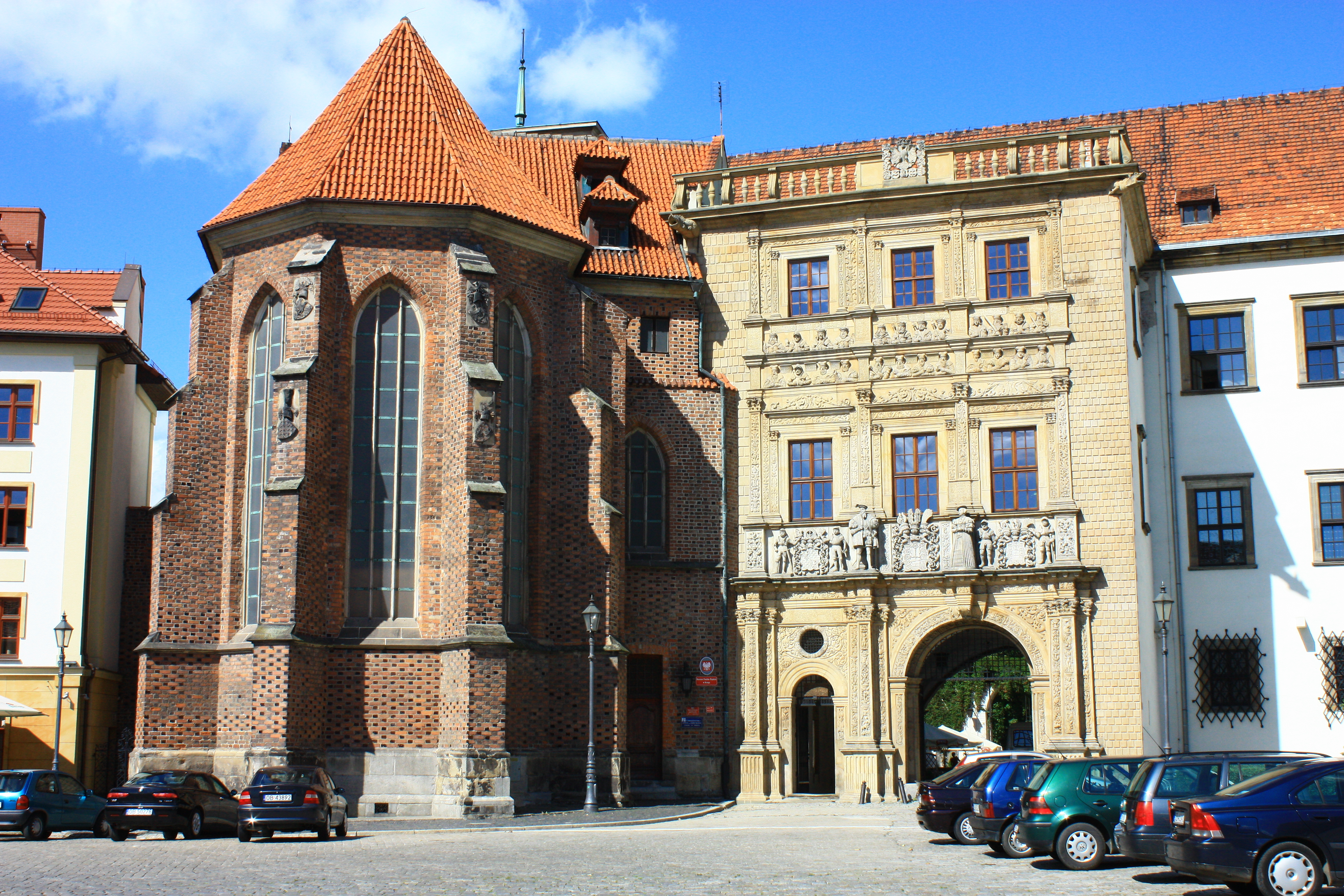
St. Jadwiga's Church, part of Brzeg Castle

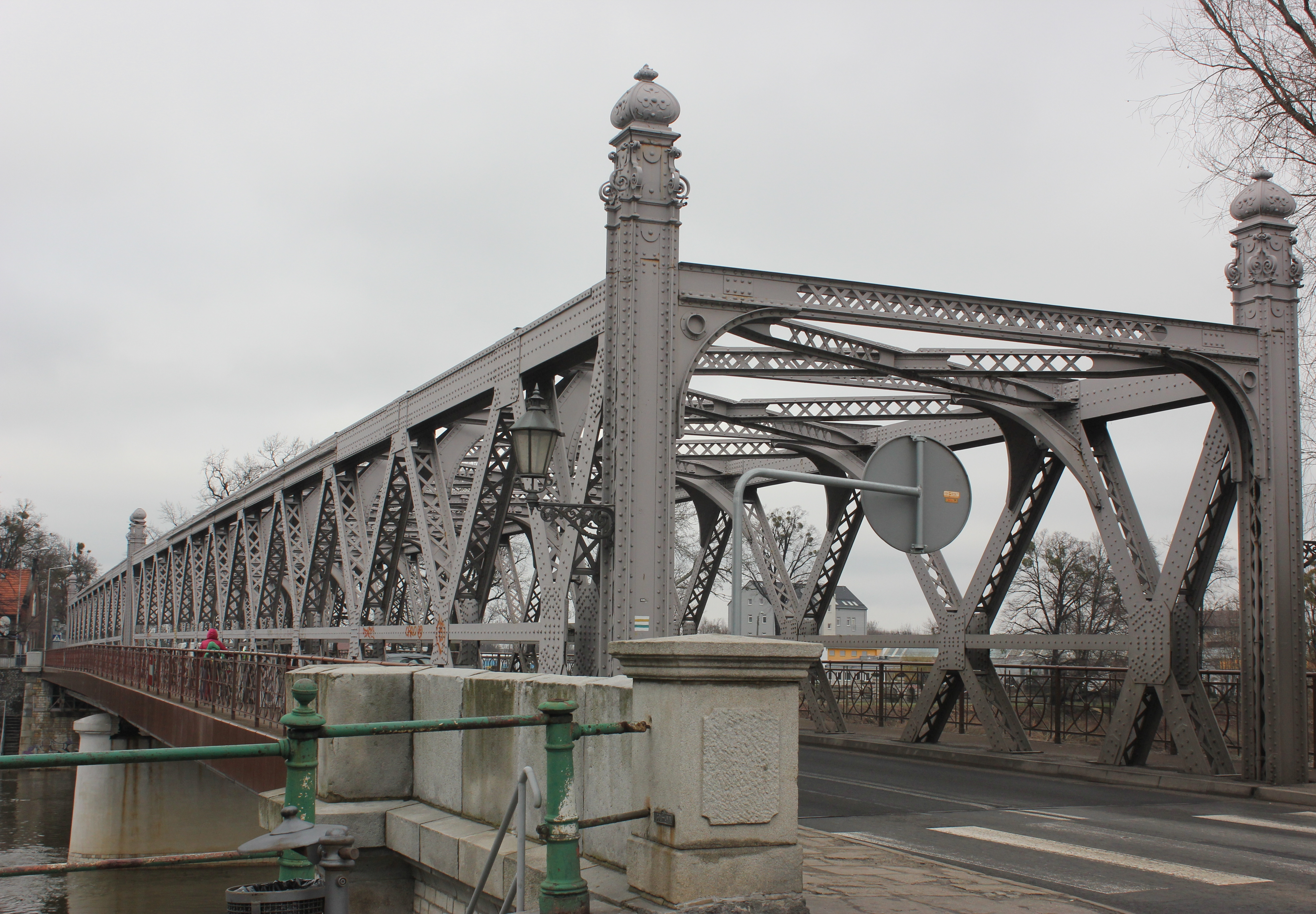
Piastowski Bridge

Breakdown of population origin of Brzeg in 1950:

Population origin	Population no.	Percentage (%)
Total population	12,771	100.0
Local population	824	6.5
Migrant population	11,947	93.5

Breakdown of migrant population origin of Brzeg in 1950:

Population origin	Population no.	Percentage (%)
Warsaw	469	3.9
Warsaw Voivodeship	365	3.0
Bydgoszcz Voivodeship	289	2.4
Poznań Voivodeship	533	4.5
Łódź	75	0.6
Łódź Voivodeship	529	4.4
Kielce Voivodeship	749	6.3
Lublin Voivodeship	387	3.2
Białystok Voivodeship	144	1.2
Katowice Voivodeship	747	6.3
Kraków Voivodeship	911	7.6
Soviet Union	5,144	43.1
Other countries	200	1.7
Remaining	1,405	11.8

Population change:

Year	Population	Year	Population
2002	38 841 ▼	2003	38 781 ▼
2004	38 550 ▼	2005	38 379 ▼
2006	38 163 ▼	2007	37 842 ▼
2008	37 625 ▼	2009	37 609 ▼
2010	37 346 ▼	2011	37 329 ▼
2012	37 261 ▼	2013	36 980 ▼
2014	36 675 ▼	2015	36 469 ▼
2016	36 381 ▼	2017	36 110 ▼
2018	35 930 ▼	2019	35 709 ▼
2020	35 226 ▼	2021	34 778 ▼
2023	33 403 ▼	2024	33 101 ▼

== Main sights ==
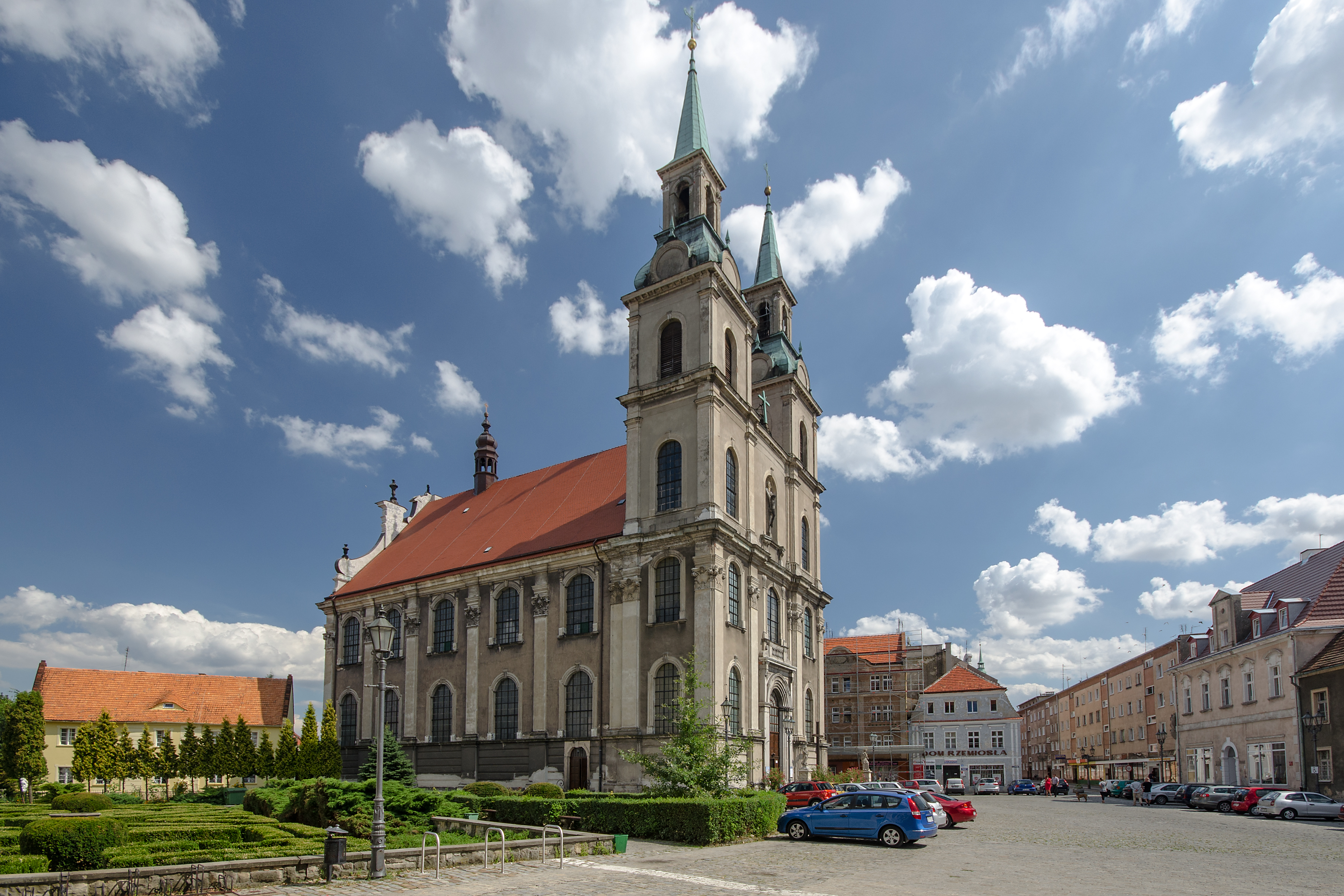
Church of the Holy Cross, Brzeg

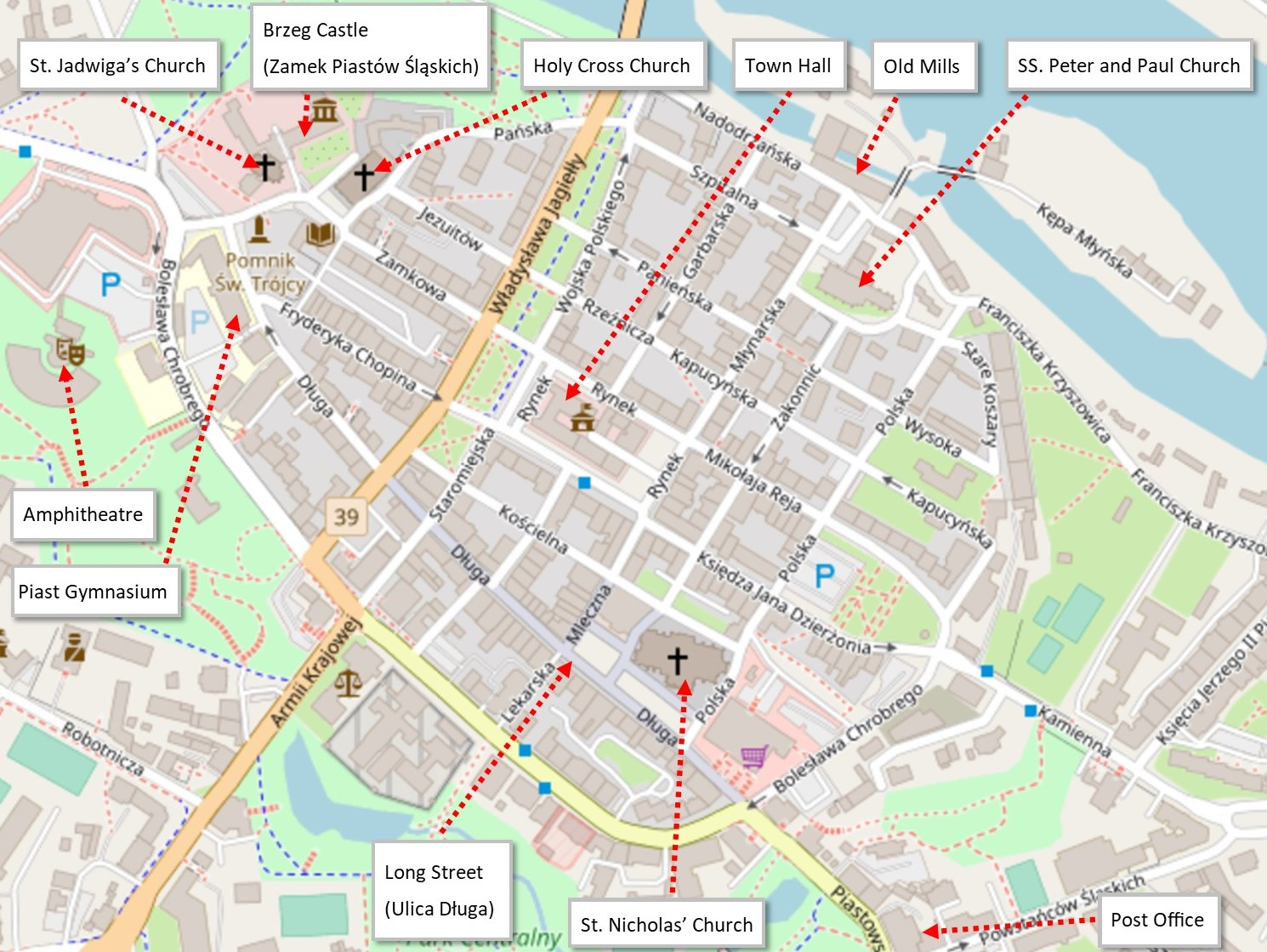
Historic town centre with main sights

- The Renaissance Brzeg Town Hall (Rynek), surrounded by thirteenth-century townhouses.
- Old Castle (Zamek), with an interesting adorned façade, host of the Muzeum Piastów Śląskich. The Brzeg Castle is referred to as the Silesian Wawel. The castle-complex includes the Chapel of St. Jadwiga of Poland.
- St. Nicholas's Church (Gothic architectural style).
- Holy Cross Church (on old castle square), (Baroque architectural style).
- St. Jadwiga's Church, located by the castle.
- St. Luke's Church, a church built in the Neoclassical architectural style.
- Saints Peter and Paul Church, a Franciscan church built in the thirteen-century.
- Christ's Resurrection Church, a garrison church built in the Baroque architectural style.
- Baroque figures of John of Nepomuk and Jude the Apostle from 1722, standing by the façade of the Holy Cross Church.
- Statue of the Holy Trinity (on old castle square), raised in 1731.
- Piast Gimnasium (Gimnazium Piastowskie) founded in 1569.
- Odrzańska Gate, part of the former fortifications; located in the Park Odrzański (Odranian Park).
- Water tower (Wieża ciśnień) by Rybacka Street (ul. Rybacka), from 1877.
- Residential townhouses:
  - Rynek 19, Renaissance façade from 1621 (reconstruction).
  - Chopina 1, Renaissance from 1597.
  - Jabłkowa 5, Baroque townhouse from 1715.
  - Jabłkowa 7, Empire architectural style from 1797.
- Old Garrison buildings (Stare Koszary) from the Frederick the Great colonisation period.
- Planty - remaining bastion fortifications around the medieval town. The fortifications were deconstructed in 1807, with the area transformed into the Planty Park.
- Synagogue from 1799.
- River Boat Station (Brzeg Marina) (on the east bank of the Oder), built in 2012.

== Economy ==
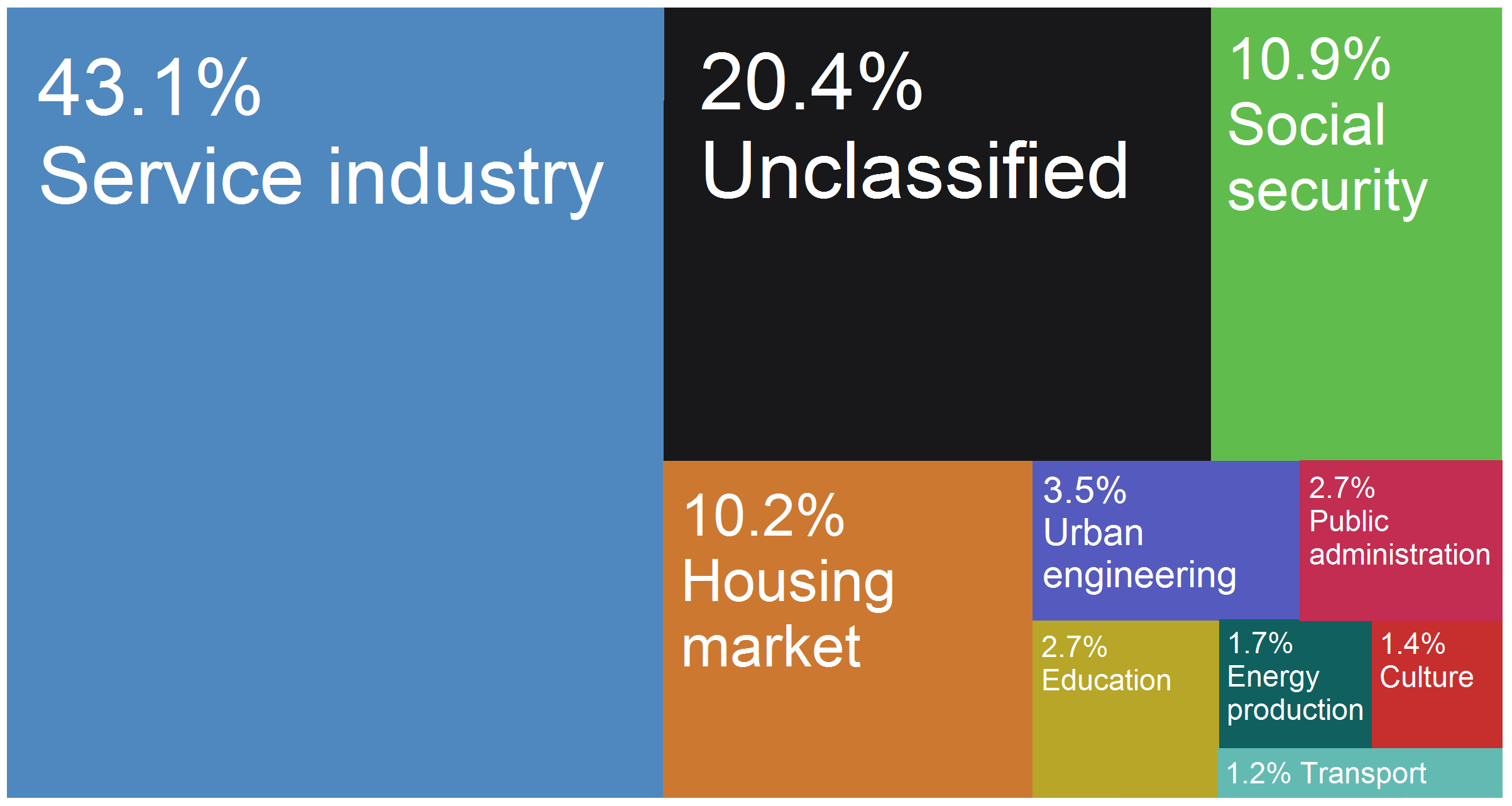
Brzeg city budget's income sources as of 2015.

=== Industry ===
Brzeg is the centre for industry and production in the Brzeg County. The town's industries include the production of agricultural machinery, electric engines, margarine and sugar production.

The largest concentration of industry in Brzeg is located in the town's eastern quarter, south of the Oder, with numerous manufacturers, including: the German Bartling GmbH (plastic packaging company); "BESEL" (Polish electric engine company, founded in the town in 1950), and CIK car accessories plant. All three industries are located between Ciepłownicza Street (ul. Ciepłownicza) and Składowa Street (ul. Składowa).

Brzeg is also home to one of the largest confectionery companies in Poland, PWC Odra S.A. (founded in 1946). Presently, the firm is part of the joint-stock company Otmuchów Group. The production plant is located by Starobrzeska Street (ul. Starobrzeska).

=== Tourism ===
As of 2015, Brzeg had the lowest number of foreign tourists in the Opole Voivodeship, with some 95% being national tourists. Per 1000 of the population, there are 1.60–3.89 available accommodations, which is behind nine of the eleven regional capitals (being at level with Kędzierzyn-Koźle) in the Opole Voivodeship, including Opole, with 3.90–5.89 tourist accommodations per 1000 of the population.

== Education ==
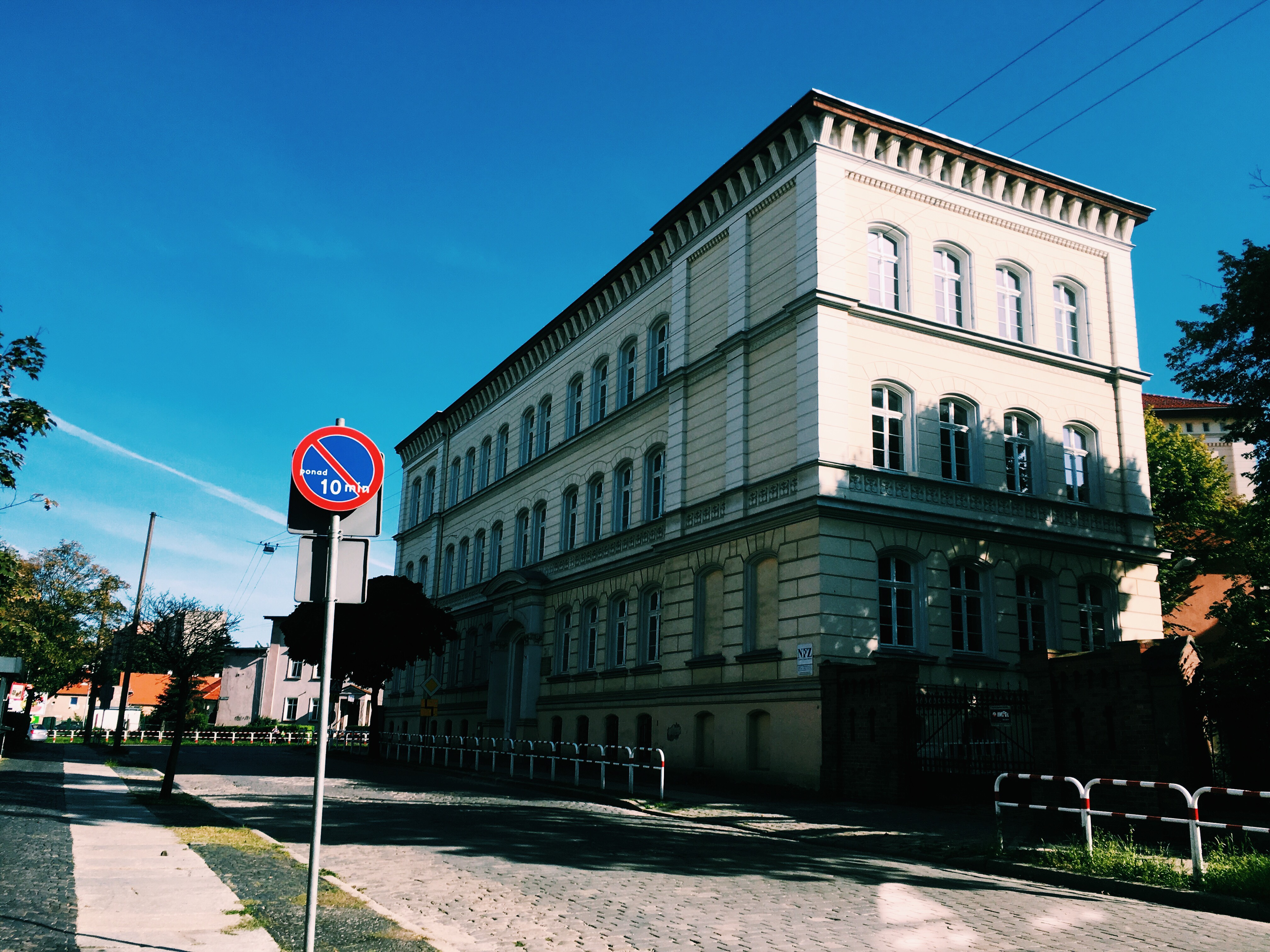
Jan Kochanowski Primary School No. 3 by Kamienna Street.

Brzeg has a total of 7,826 citizens in the potential education age group (3-24 year of age). The number of city dwellers in Brzeg that have completed higher education is at 14.4% of the population, which is similar to the statistical average of the number of people obtaining higher education in the Opole Voivodeship, being at 15.1%. Data from 2015 indicates that 2.5% of the population of Brzeg have completed post-lyceum (policealne) education, with Brzeg having two post-lyceum schools (szkoły policealne): Medyczne Studium Zawodowe by Ofiar Katynia Street (medical practice institution); Policealne Studium Zawodowe – Zespół Szkół Ekonomicznych by Jan Paweł II Street (higher school of economics). The population of Brzeg that is in the age of potential further education (aged 19–24) is 26.8%, out of which 27.1% are women and 26.6% are men.

Some 22.4% of the population of the town of Brzeg (as of 2015) has some sort of work-related further education (i.e. scholarship or college course). In 2015, 5.3% of the town's population participated in secondary education, while some 19.6% have attended primary education in that same year. The city council of Brzeg spends 33.3% of its annual budget on education, amounting to 35.2 million zlotys annually.

Post-secondary education institutions:

Name	Address	Faculty no.	Student no.	Teacher no.	Website
Technikum No. 1 in Brzeg	Słowiańska 18	21	466	–	–
Technikum No. 2 in Brzeg	Jana Pawła II 28	14	370	–	–
I Liceum ogólnokształcące (Bolesław Chrobry)	Armii Krajowej 7	10	320	31	Official Website
II Liceum ogólnokształcące (Zbigniew Herbert)	1 Maja 7	13	341	36	Official Website
Zasadnicza Szkoła Zawodowa No. 3 (Książę Jerzy II Piast)	Kamienna 3	9	261	–	Official Website
Technikum No. 3 (Książę Jerzy II Piast)	Kamienna 3	8	207	–	Official Website
Państwowa Szkoła Muzyczna Level 1 (Józef Elsner)	Piastowska 18	–	161	20	Official Website

Public gymnasium (secondary school) institutions:

Name	Address	Faculty no.	Student no.	Teacher no.	Website
Gymnasium No. 3 (Orlęta Lwowskie)	Bohaterów Monte Cassino 14	12	343	35	Official Website
Gymnasium No. 2	Poprzeczna 16	12	317	—	—
Gymnasium No. 1 (Józef Piłsudski)	Oławska 2	9	225	26	Official Website
Gymnasium No. 4	Lompy 1	6	142	—	—

== Transport ==
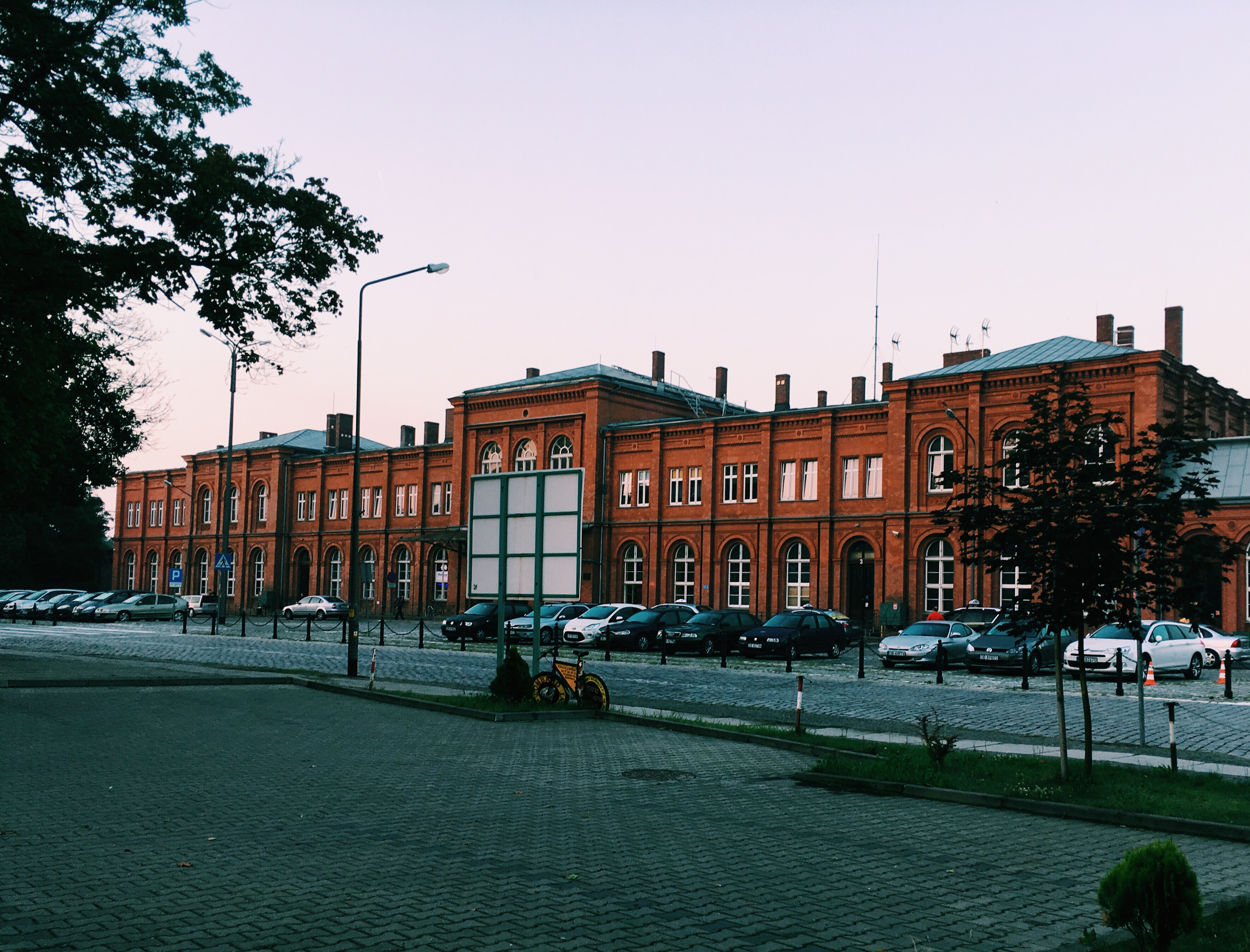
Brzeg railway station

Brzeg is located at the crossroads of the National Road (northbound to Namysłów and Kępno; southbound to Wiązów and Strzelin) and the National Road (westbound to Oława, Wrocław, Bolesławiec and Zgorzelec; eastbound to Opole, Strzelce Opolskie, Bytom, Kraków, Tarnów, Jarosław and Korczowa. The interchange to the Motorway (Węzeł Przylesie) is located 14 km south of Brzeg.

Brzeg has well developed railway and bus transportation services. The PKP Brzeg railway station is operated by PKP Intercity and Polregio. The town has direct connections to Opole, Wrocław, Kraków, Warsaw, Katowice, Poznań, Szczecin, Zielona Góra, Lublin, Kielce, Przemyśl, Zamość, Nysa, and other cities. The Brzeg bus service is operated by PKS Brzeg, with ten bus lines around the town and Gmina Brzeg. The important routes are to Wrocław, Opole, Grodków, Namysłów, Nysa, Karpacz, Strzelin, Wiązów, and others. On Sunday, there is a special route to Szklarska Poręba.

In 2013, a hospital helipad was opened by Mossora Street (ul. Mossora).

== Sports ==
- KS Cukierki Odra Brzeg – women's basketball team, 8th place in Sharp Torell Basket Liga in 2003/2004 season

== Notable people ==
- C. de Bridia (born 1247), Minorite friar, wrote the Tartar Relation (de Bridia meaning "of Brzeg")
- Melchior Adam (ca.1575 in Grottkau – 1622), a German Calvinist literary historian.
- Johann Heermann (1585–1647), German poet and hymnodist
- Georg Gebel the younger (1709–1753), Prussian general
- Leopold Wilhelm von Dobschütz (1763–1836), Prussian general
- Karl Otfried Müller (1797–1840), a professor, scholar of classical Greek studies and philodorian.
- Julius Müller (1801–1878), a German Protestant theologian.
- Wilhelm Schuppe (1836–1913), German positivist philosopher
- Max Friedlaender (1852–1934), German musician and composer
- Oskar Moll (1875-1947), German painter
- Max Obal (1881–1949), German actor, screenwriter and film director
- Alfred Kurella (1895–1975), German SED functionary
- Johannes Brockt (1901–1980), German-Austrian musicologist and conductor
- Franciszek Gajowniczek (1901–1995), Polish Auschwitz survivor
- Otto Thorbeck (1912–1976), German lawyer
- Kurt Masur (1927–2015), German musician and conductor
- Mieczysław Domaradzki (1949–1998), Polish archaeologist and thracologist
- Adrian Tekliński (born 1989), Polish road and track cyclist
- Kamil Bednarek (born 1991), Polish reggae and dancehall musician and composer.
- Bartosz Białek (born 2001), Polish football player
- Paweł Salacz (born 1997), Polish handball player

== Twin towns – sister cities ==
Brzeg is twinned with:

- Beroun, Czech Republic
- Bourg-en-Bresse, France
- Goslar, Germany

== Gallery ==
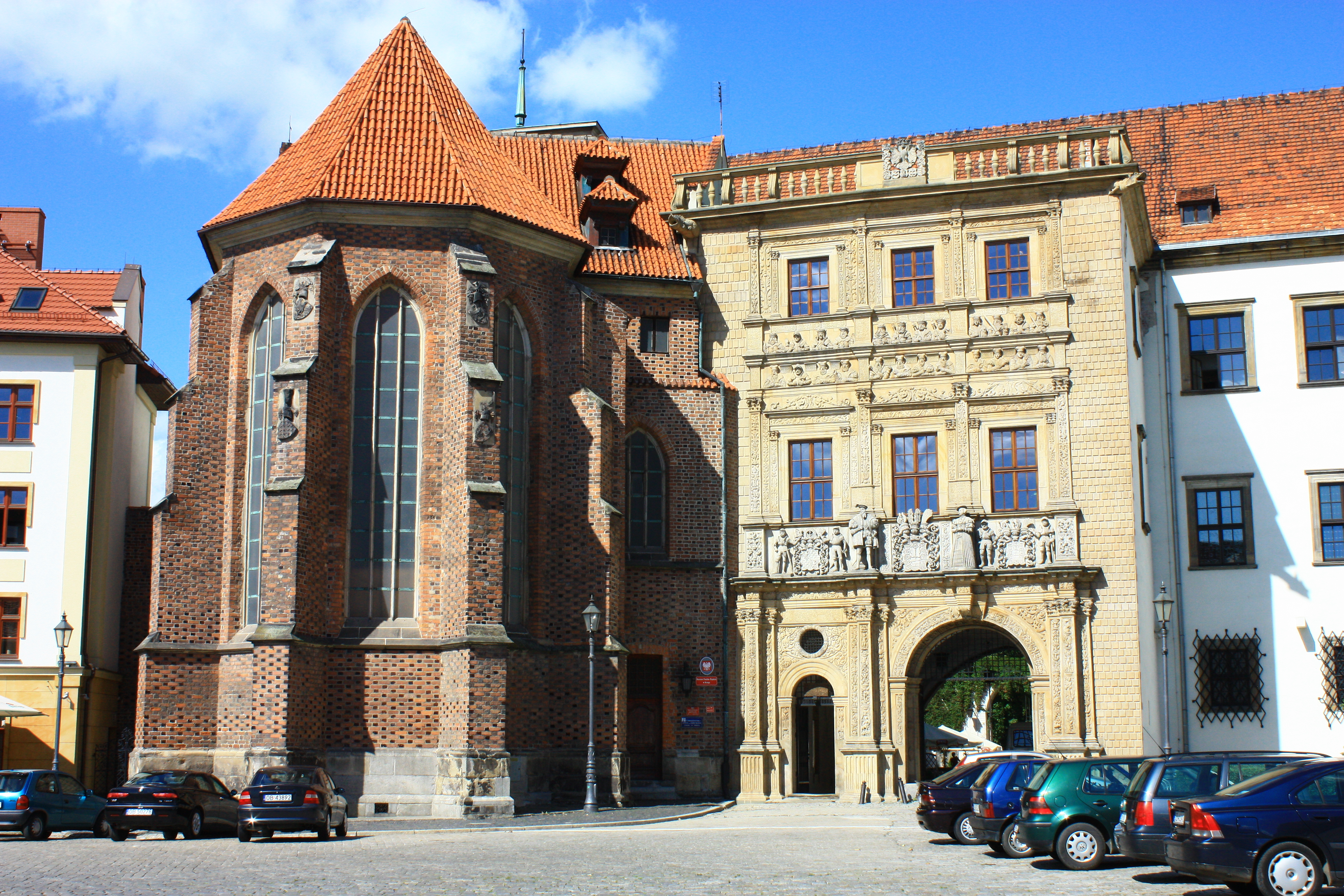
Most characteristic building of Brzeg, Silesian Piasts Castle

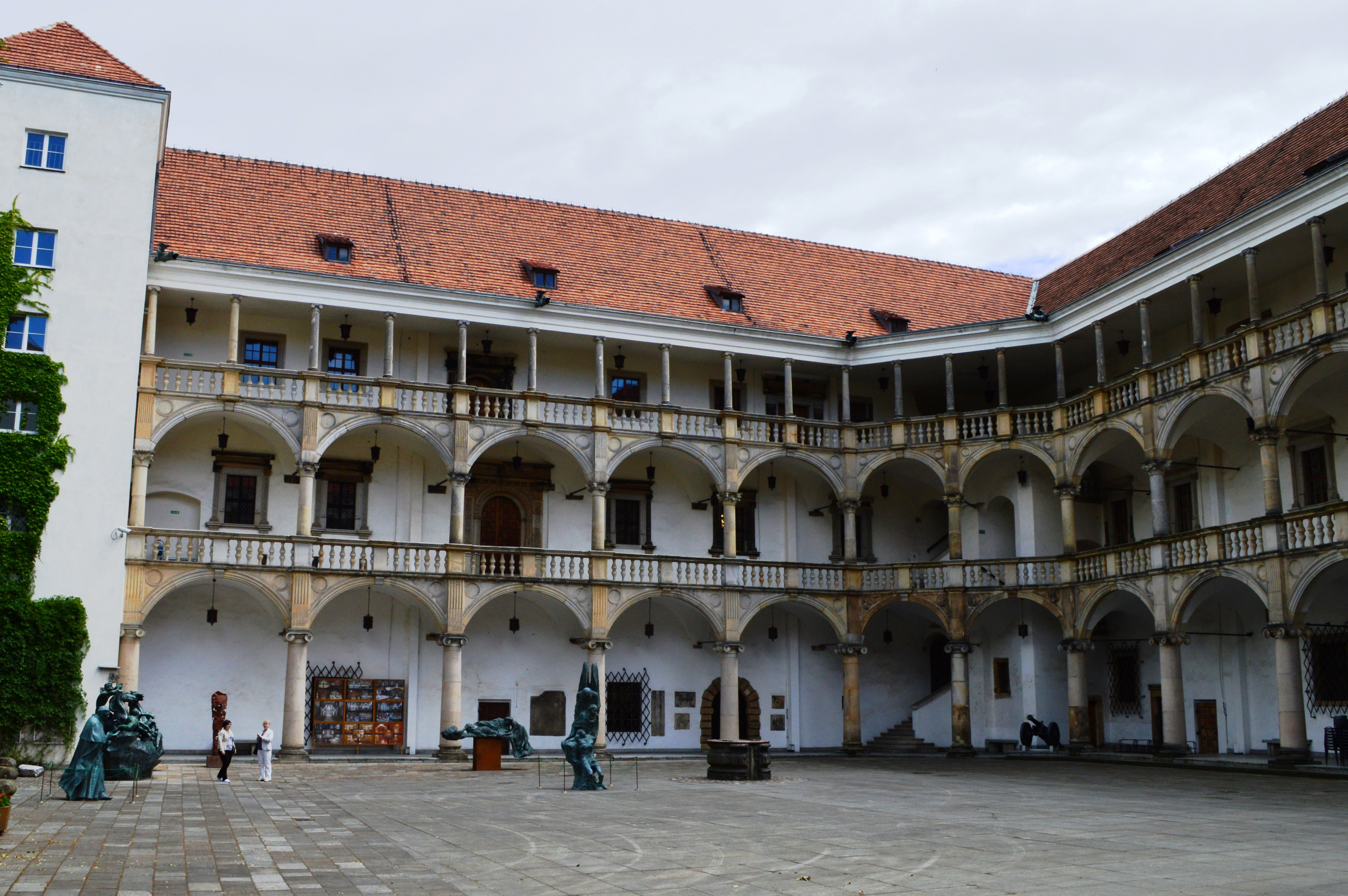
Northern side of the castle's courtyard

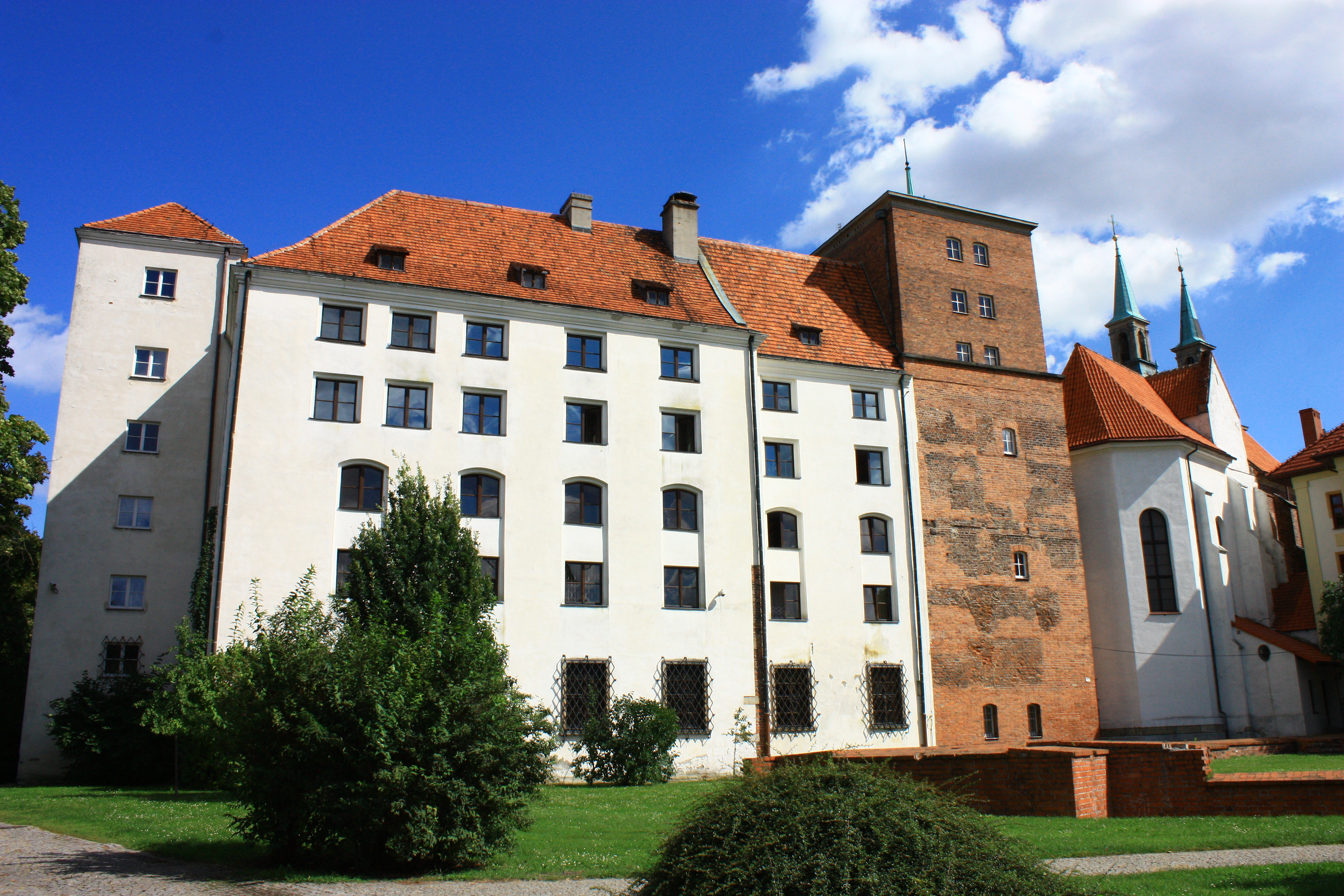
Southern side of the castle

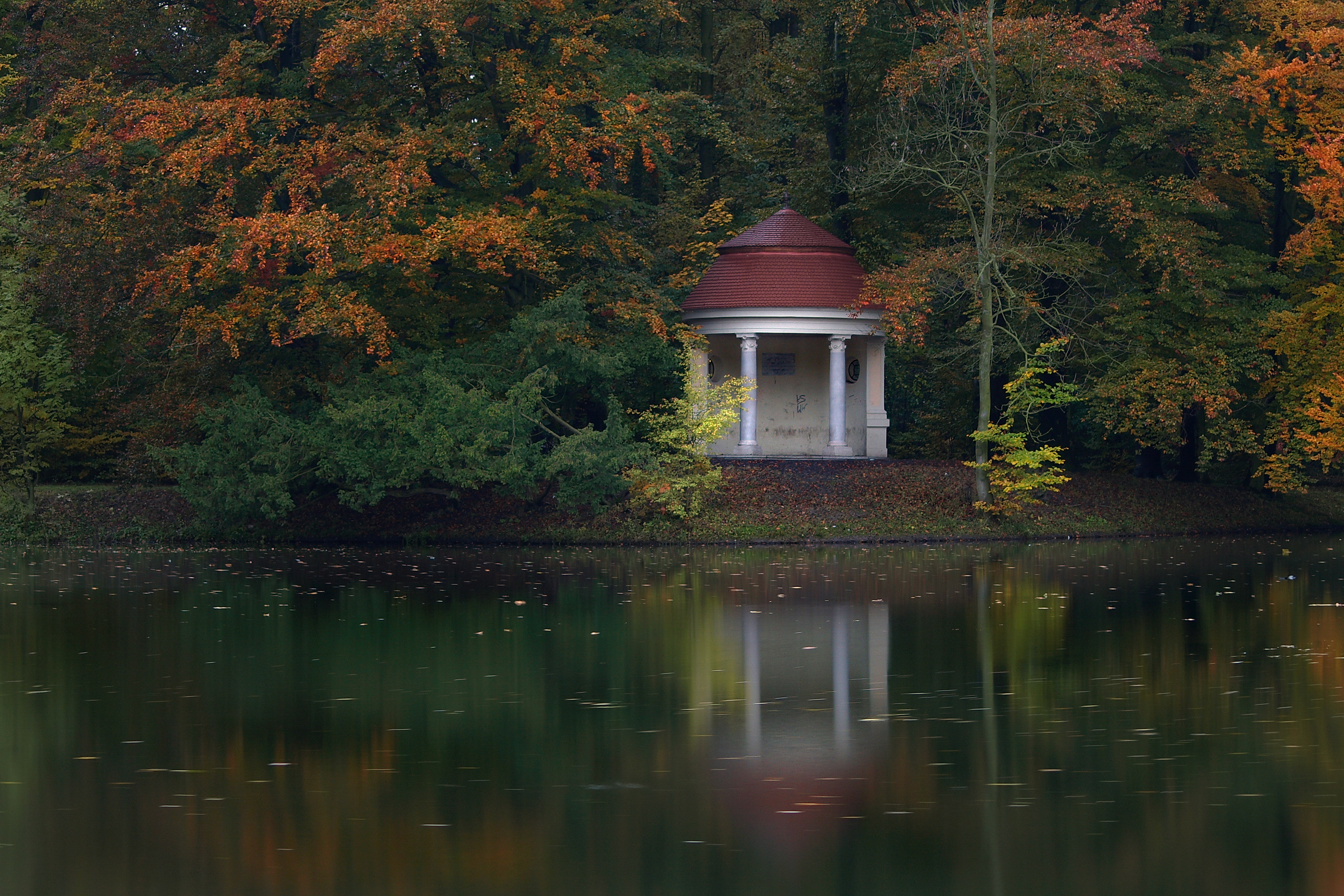
Juliusz Peppel Park, the largest public park in town

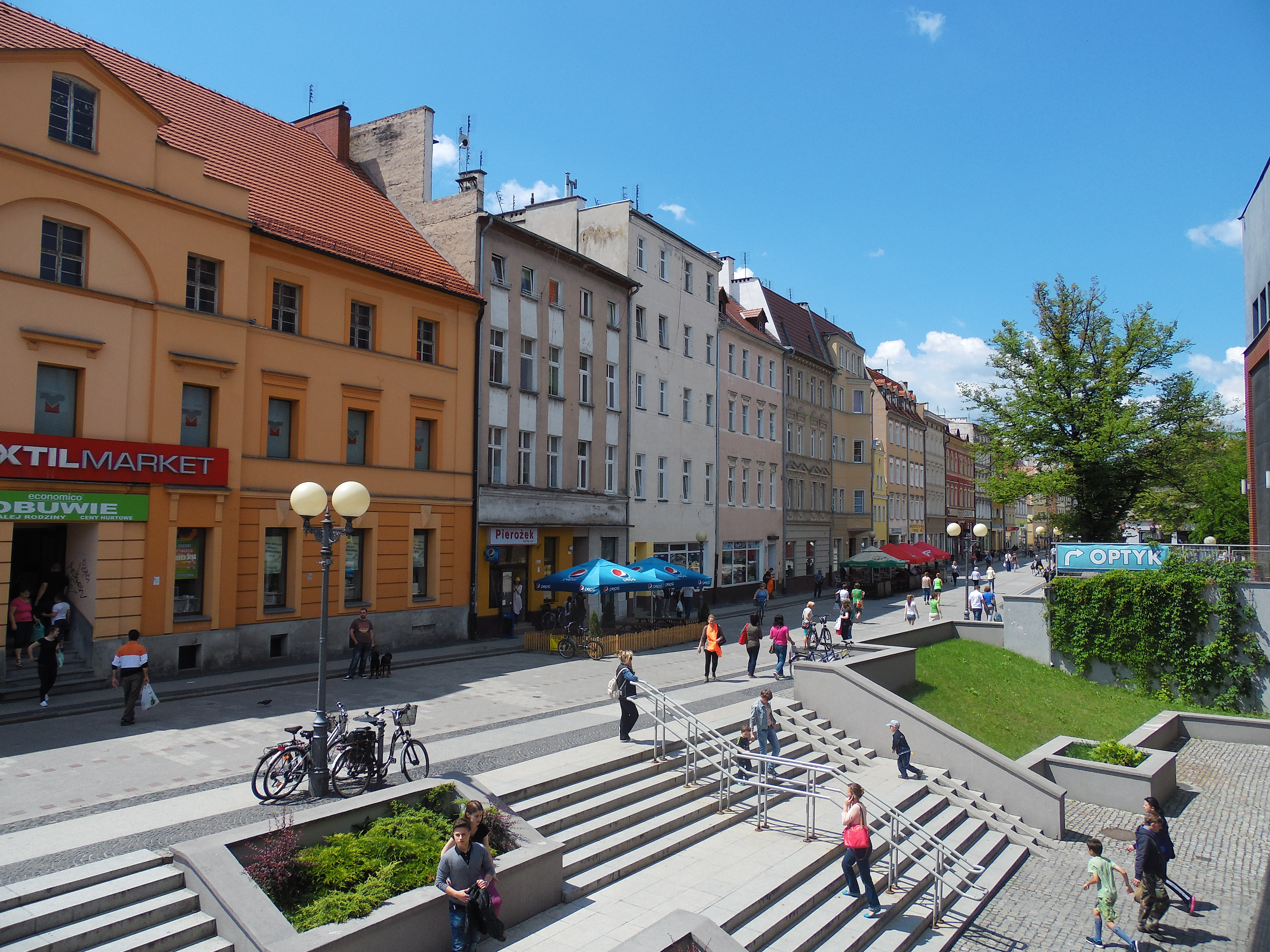
Long Street, main high street

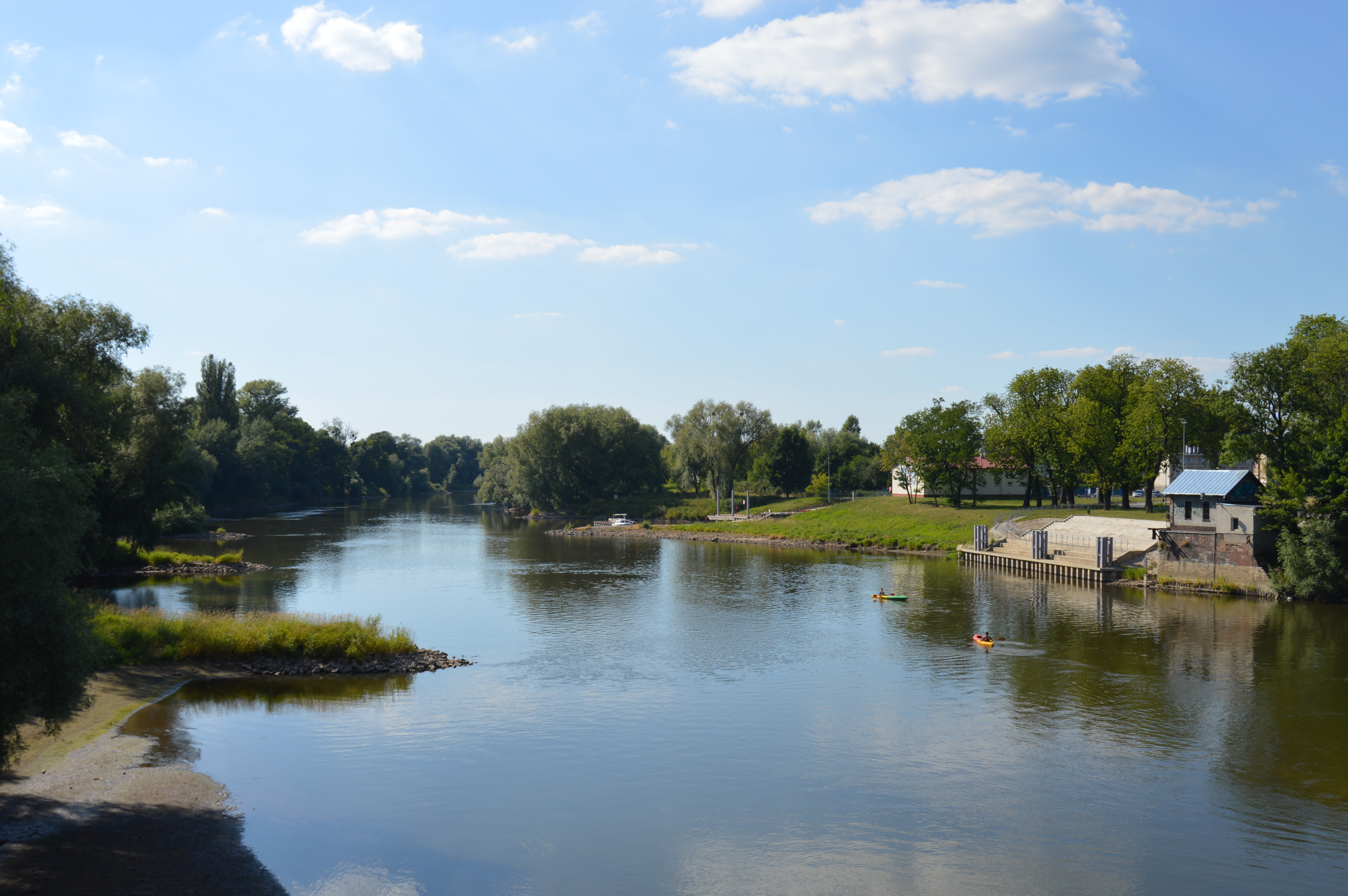
Marina by the River Oder

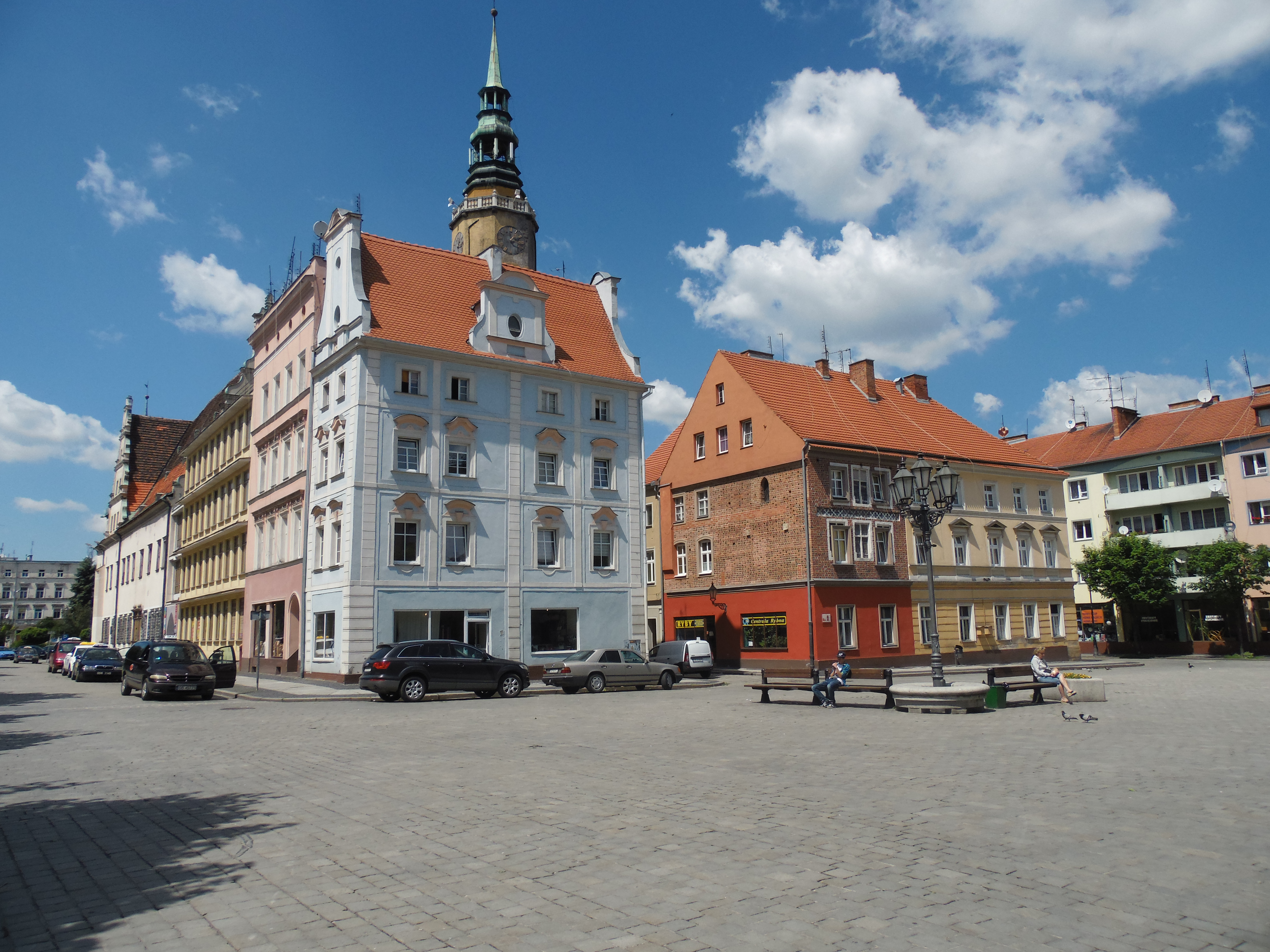
Town square and tower

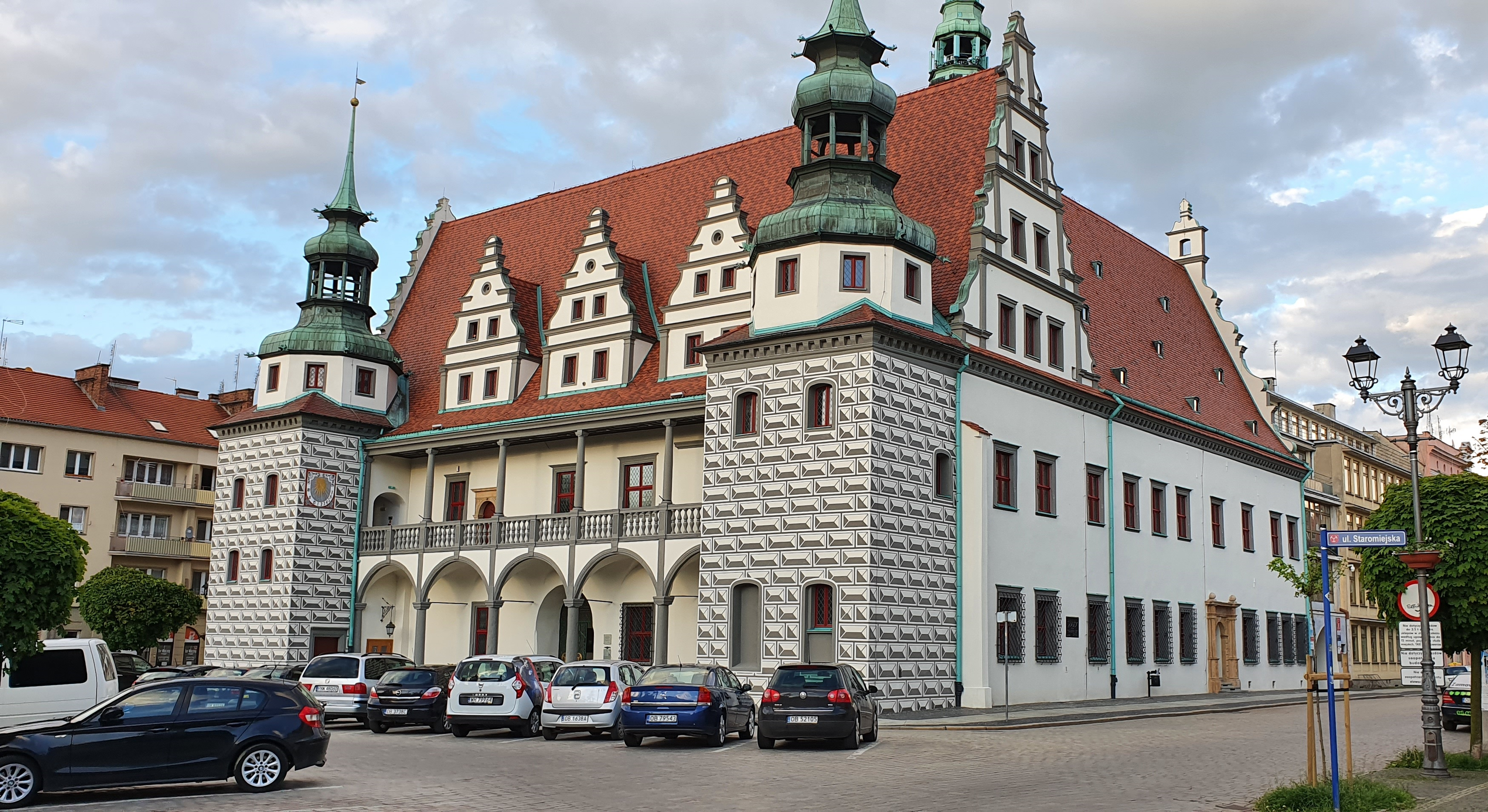
Town Hall

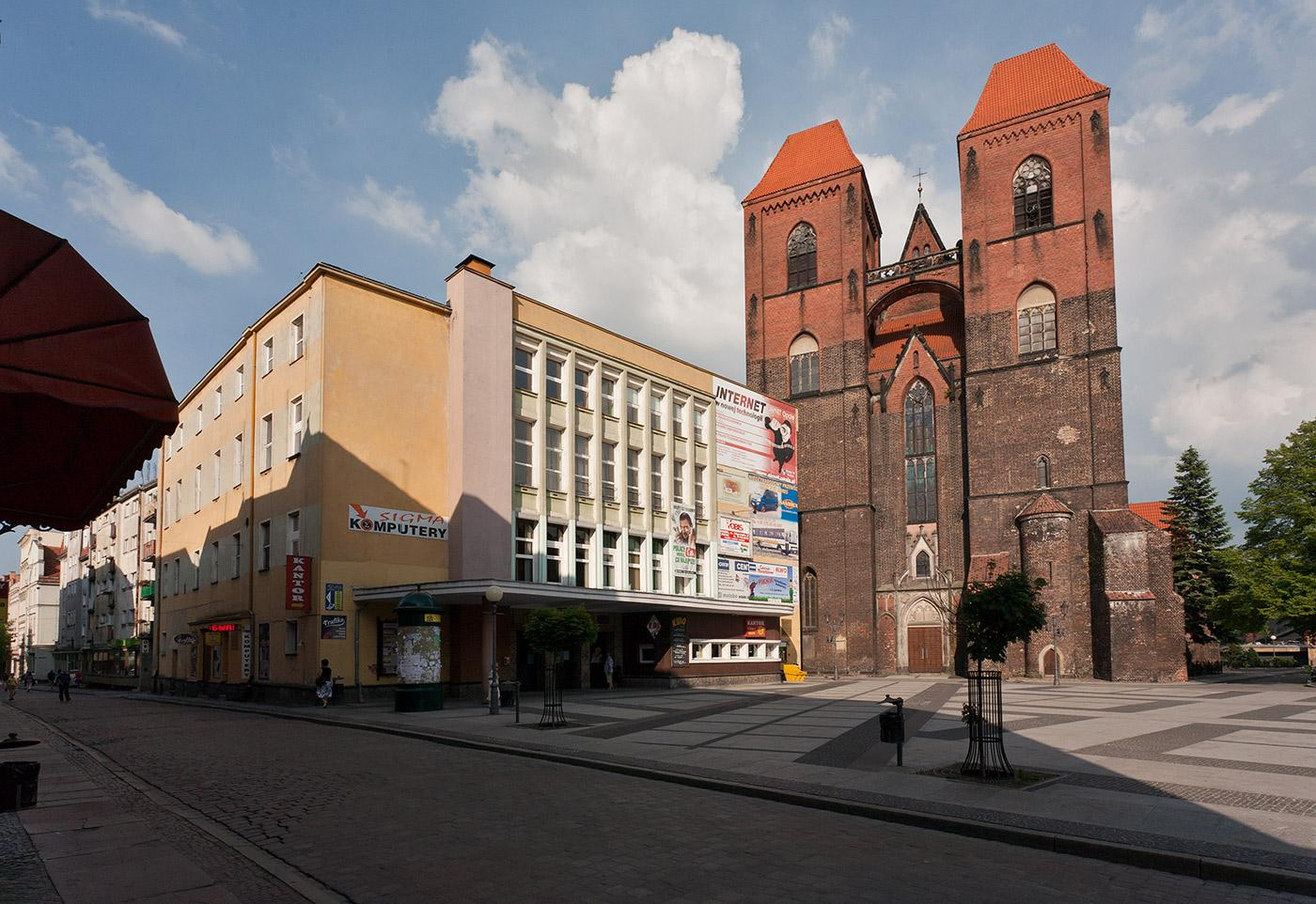
St. Nicholas Church and Brzeski Dom Kultury cultural centre

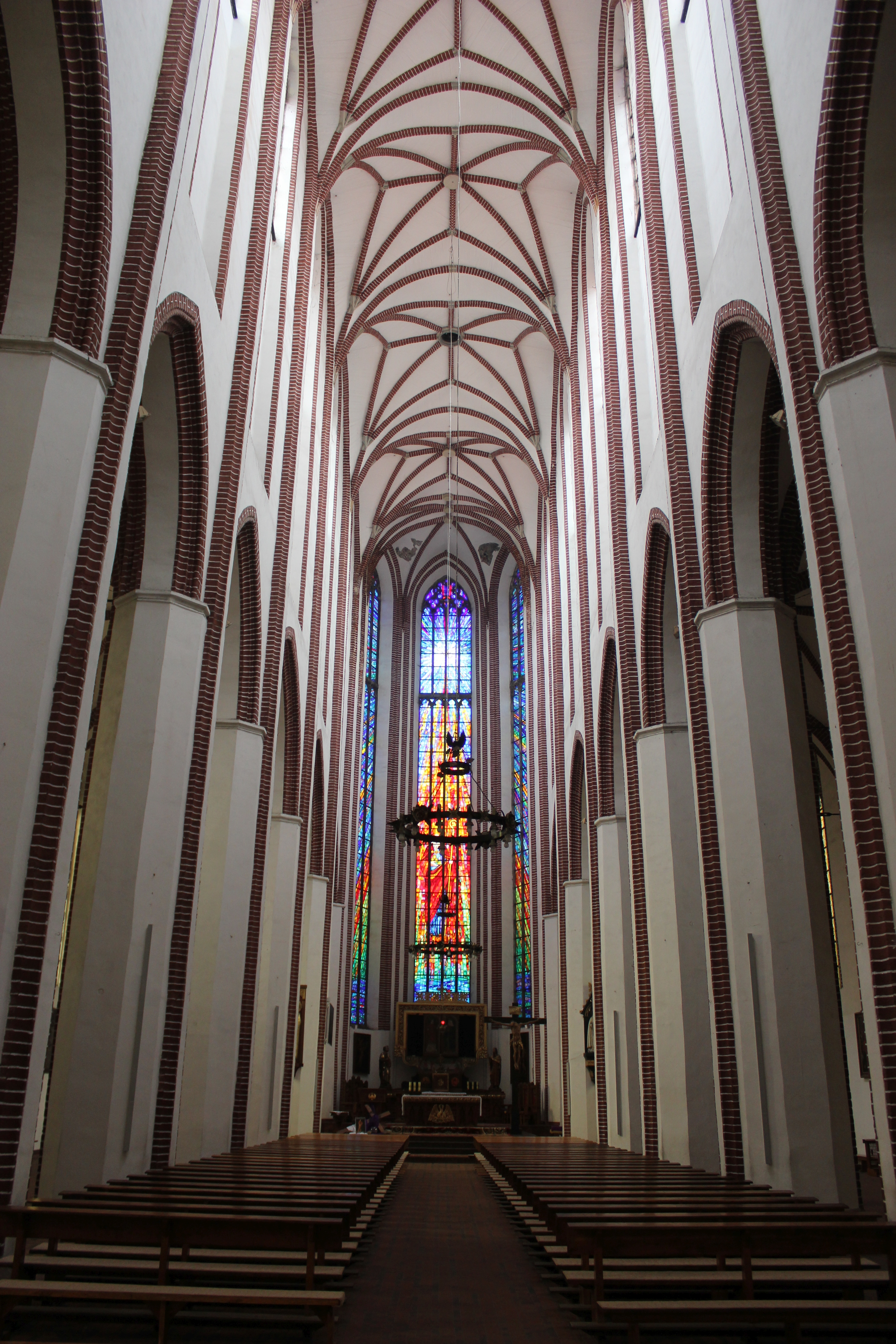
Interior of the church

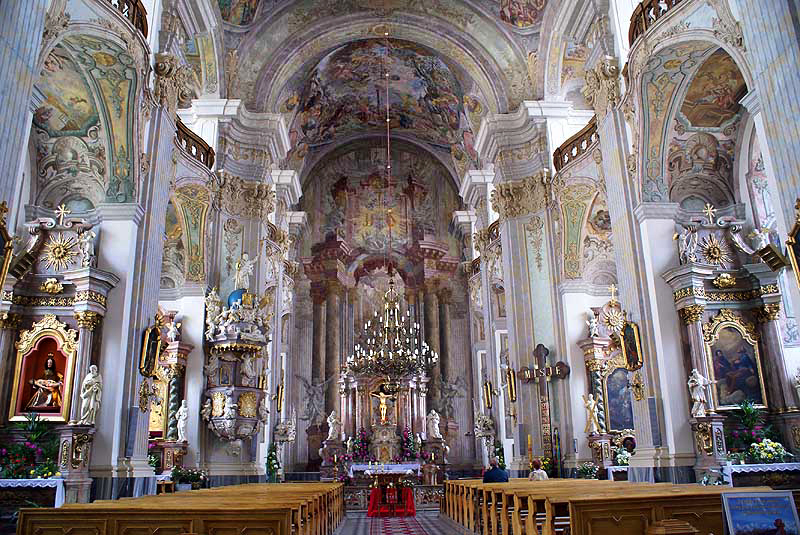
Interior of the Holy Cross Church

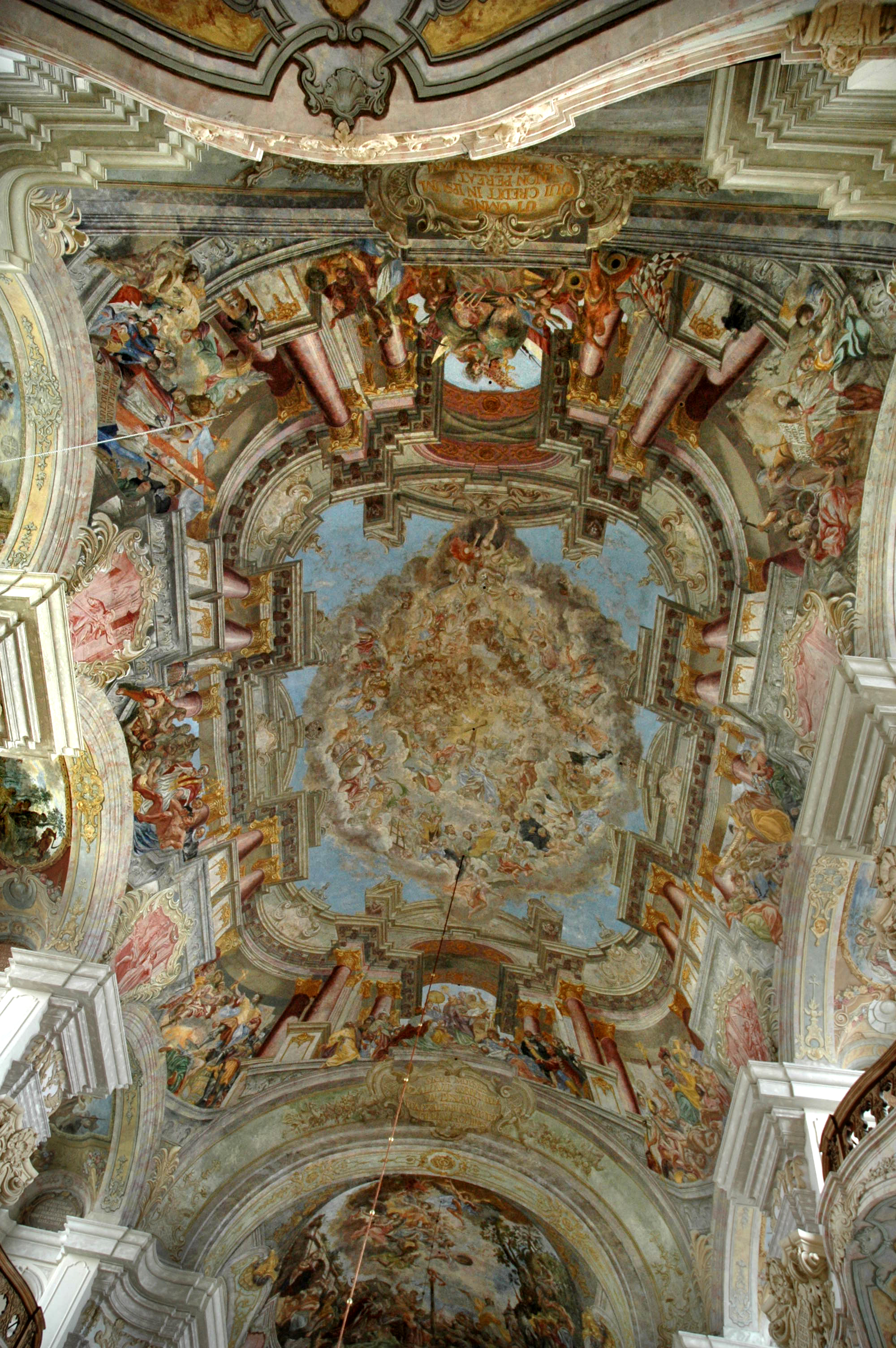
Church ceiling
