= Architecture of Poland =

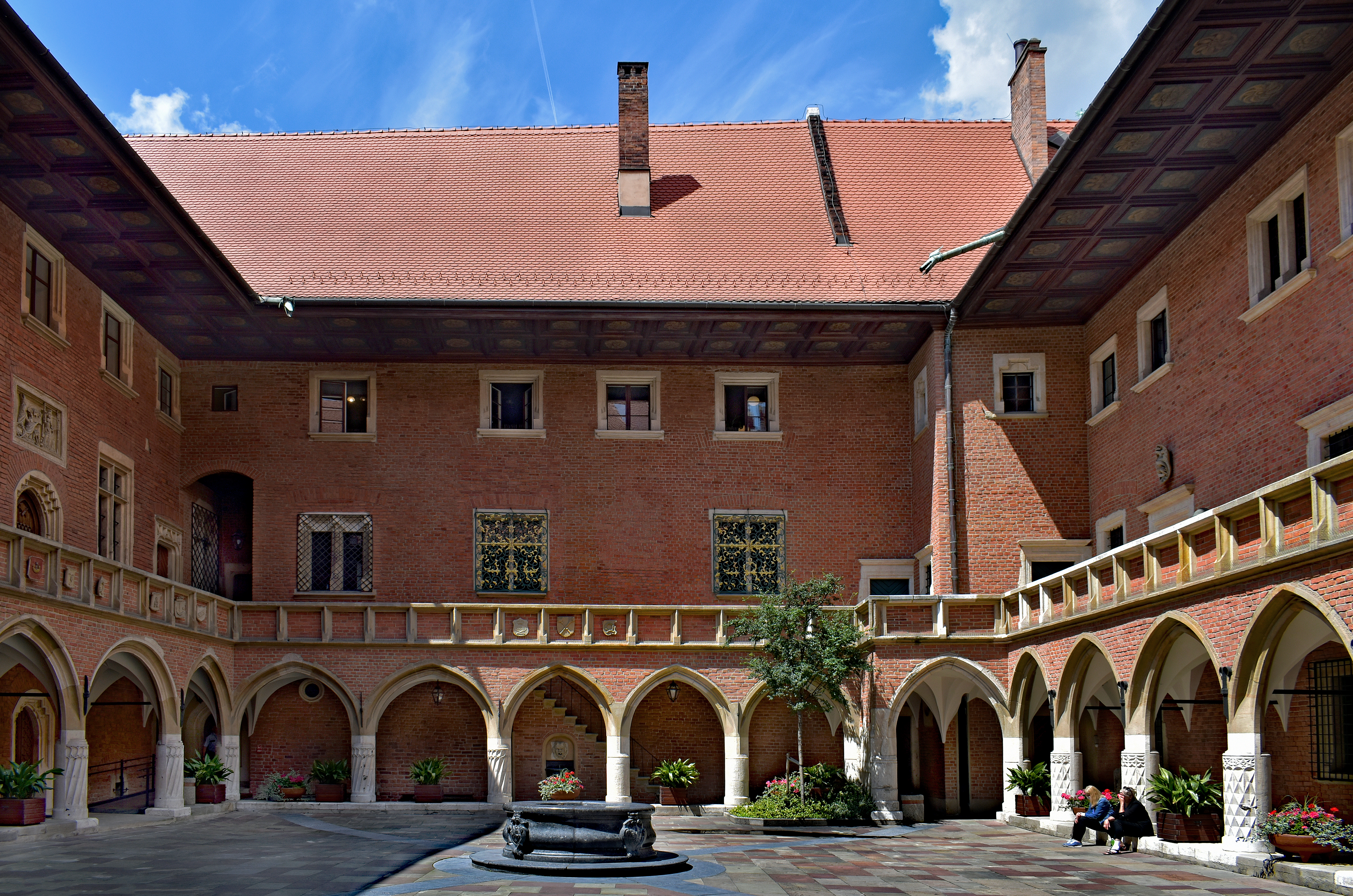
Brick Gothic is the most distinctive style for medieval Polish architecture, often associated with Poland and the Baltic Sea region

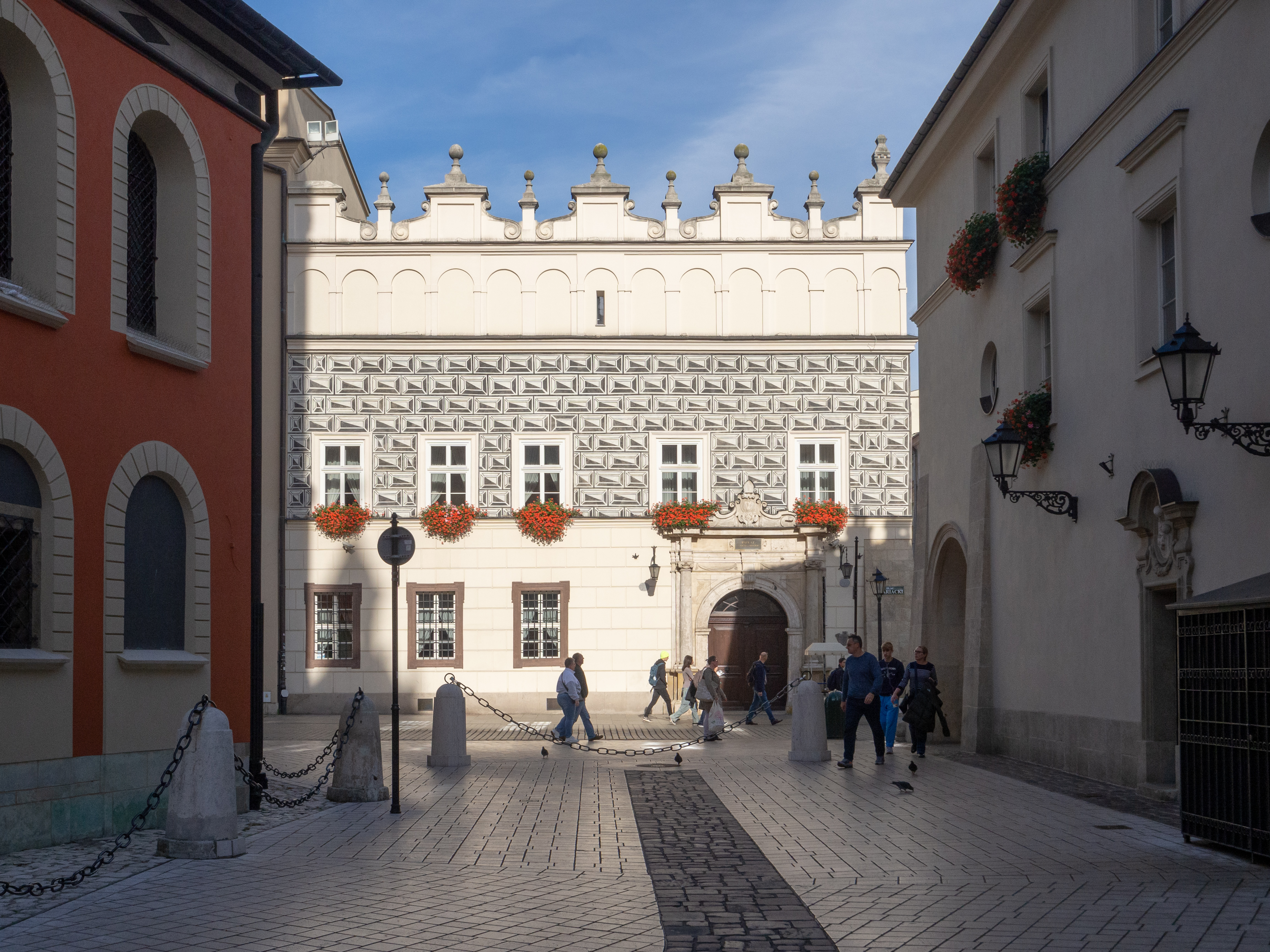
The decorated attics above the cornice is a typical feature of Polish Renaissance architecture from the 16th century

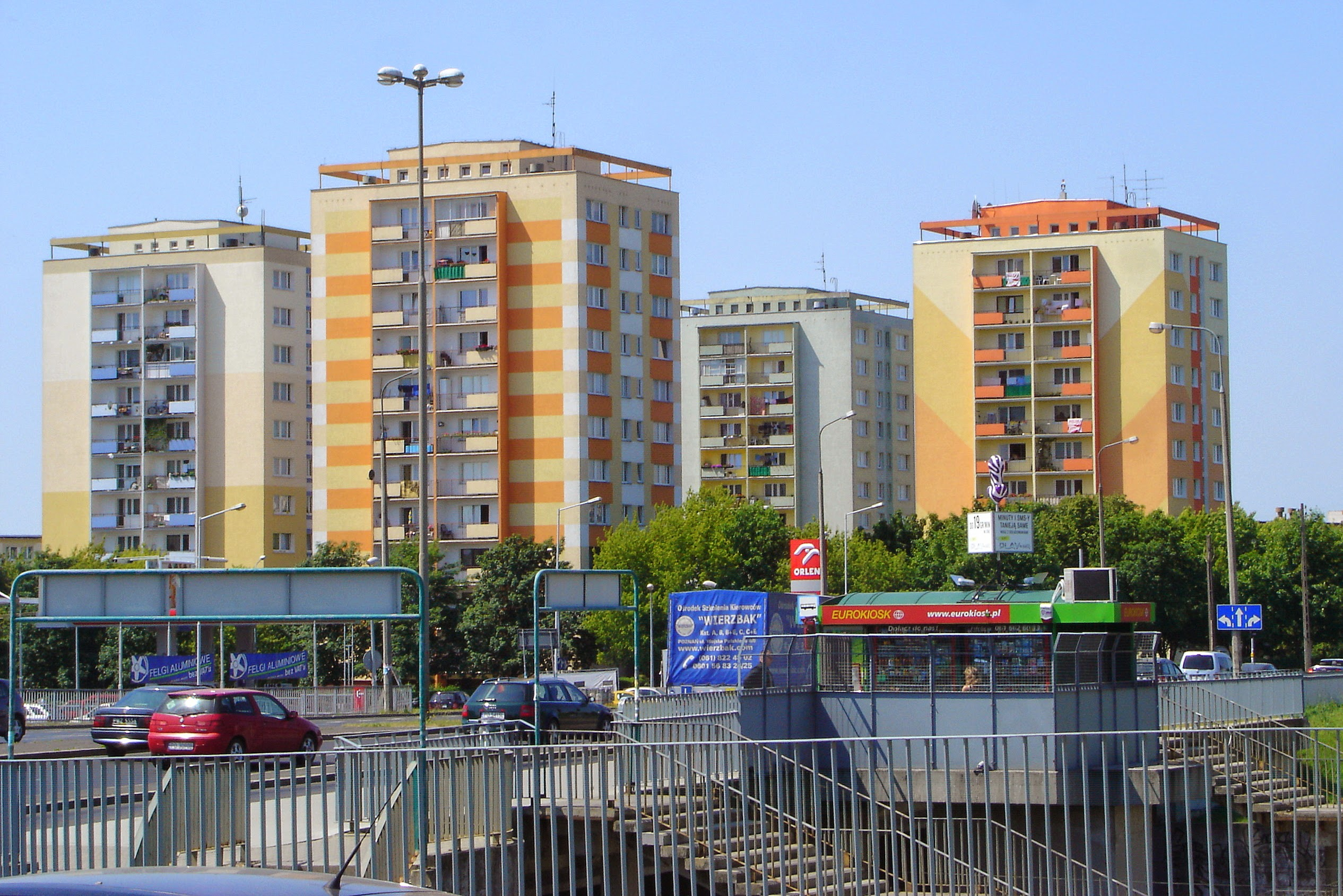
Functionalist and prefabricated tower blocks from the 1970s

The architecture of Poland reflects the country’s political, religious, and cultural development since 966 AD, when the Polish state first emerged. The country's architectural heritage is defined by a broad sequence of major European styles, each leaving a clear imprint on the country’s cities and landscapes, and the architectural forms and styles greatly differ between the various regions of Poland.

The Romanesque (10th and 11th century) and Gothic architecture (13th century) established Poland’s earliest monumental forms, in particular the Brick Gothic style which was utilised extensively in churches and castles during the Middle Ages and later in Gothic Revival. The Renaissance (early 16th century) introduced classical harmony and proportion, visible in planned urban layouts, arcaded courtyards, and façades with decorated attics above the cornice, which is the most recognisable feature of the Polish Renaissance. Notably, Mannerism and Northern Mannerism left a considerable legacy in built heritage across the country. Baroque architecture then became dominant (late 16th century), characterised by stucco decoration, ornamented interiors and palace complexes. Following the Partitions of Poland, under foreign rule, the late 18th and 19th century brought Neoclassicism, Eclecticism and industrial architecture.

In the 20th century, Poland’s architecture was shaped by modernism (functionalism), socialist realism, and extensive post-World War II reconstruction of major cities, especially Warsaw and Gdańsk. Modernist housing estates and public buildings became widespread between 1920 and 1939, while socialist realist projects emphasized monumental scale and ideological symbolism from 1949 until the mid-1950s. Between 1960 and 1989, prefabricated functionalist housing estates were the dominant form of architectural expression in which the form follows function. After 1989, largely controversial postmodernism became widespread before being succeeded by contemporary architecture in more recent years. At present, Poland leads in the adaptive reuse of industrial sites and in the revitalisation of its built heritage.

Several important works of Western architecture, such as the Wawel Hill, the Książ and Malbork castles, cityscapes of Toruń, Zamość, and Kraków are located in the country. Some of them are UNESCO World Heritage Sites. Now Poland is developing modernist approaches in design with architects like Daniel Libeskind, Karol Żurawski, and Krzysztof Ingarden.

== History ==
=== Pre-Romanesque and Romanesque architecture ===
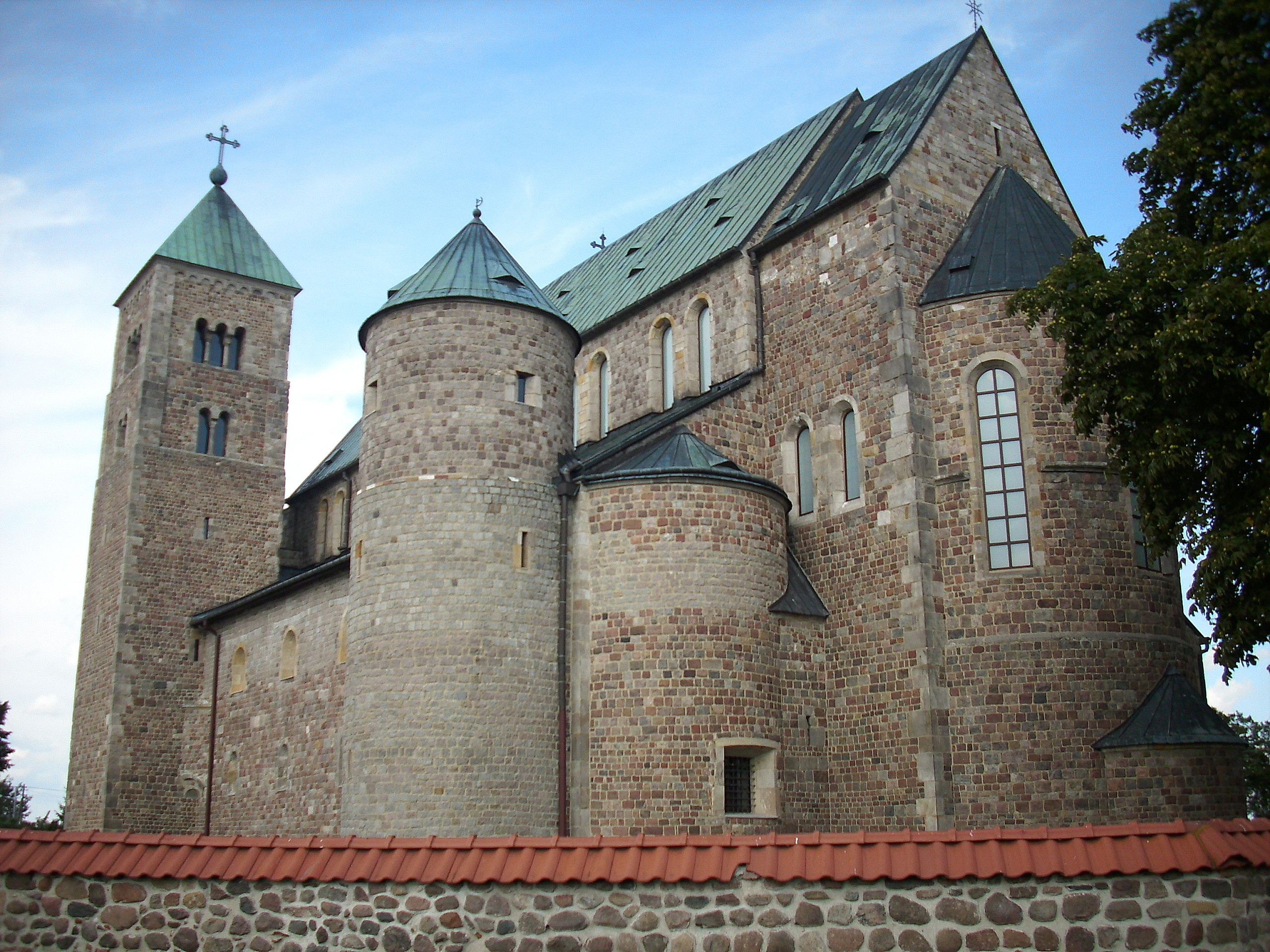
Tum Collegiate Church, 12th century

The oldest, Pre-Romanesque buildings were built in Poland after the Christianisation of the country but only few of them still exist today (palace and church complex on Ostrów Lednicki, the Rotunda of the Blessed Virgin Mary in the Wawel Castle).

The Romanesque architecture was then developed in the 12th and 13th centuries. The most significant buildings are the second cathedral in Kraków (only parts of it still exist in the current, third, gothic cathedral, e.g. the crypt), Tum Collegiate Church, Czerwińsk abbey, collegiate churches in Kruszwica and Opatów as well as the churches of St. Andrew in Kraków and of Blessed Lady Mary in Inowrocław. Smaller structures were also popular, like rotundas in Cieszyn and Strzelno.

Late Romanesque architecture is represented by the Cistercian abbeys in Jędrzejów, Koprzywnica, Sulejów and Wąchock as well as the Dominican church in Sandomierz and the ruins of Legnica castle chapel.

=== Gothic architecture ===
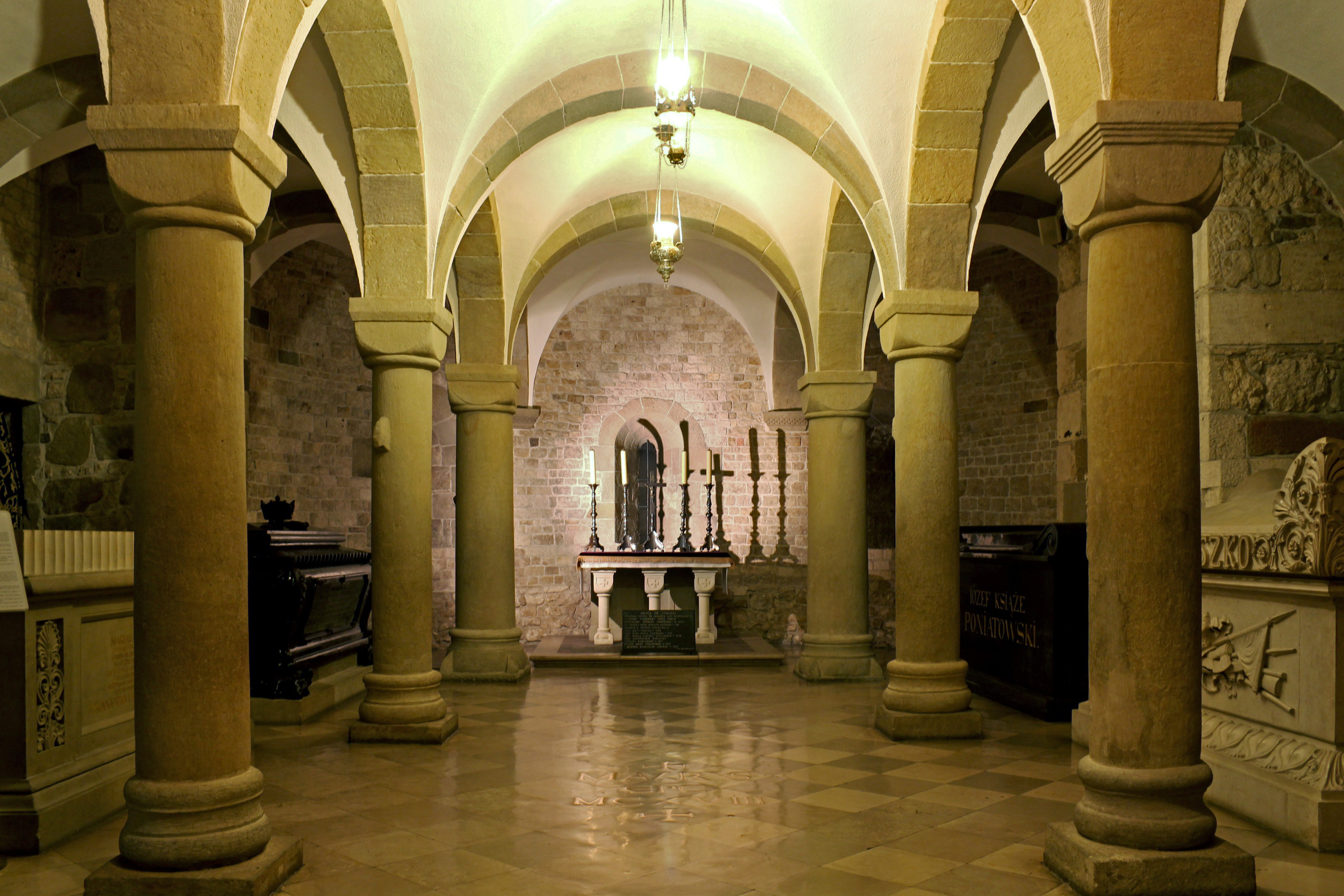
St. Leonard's Crypt at Wawel Cathedral, Kraków

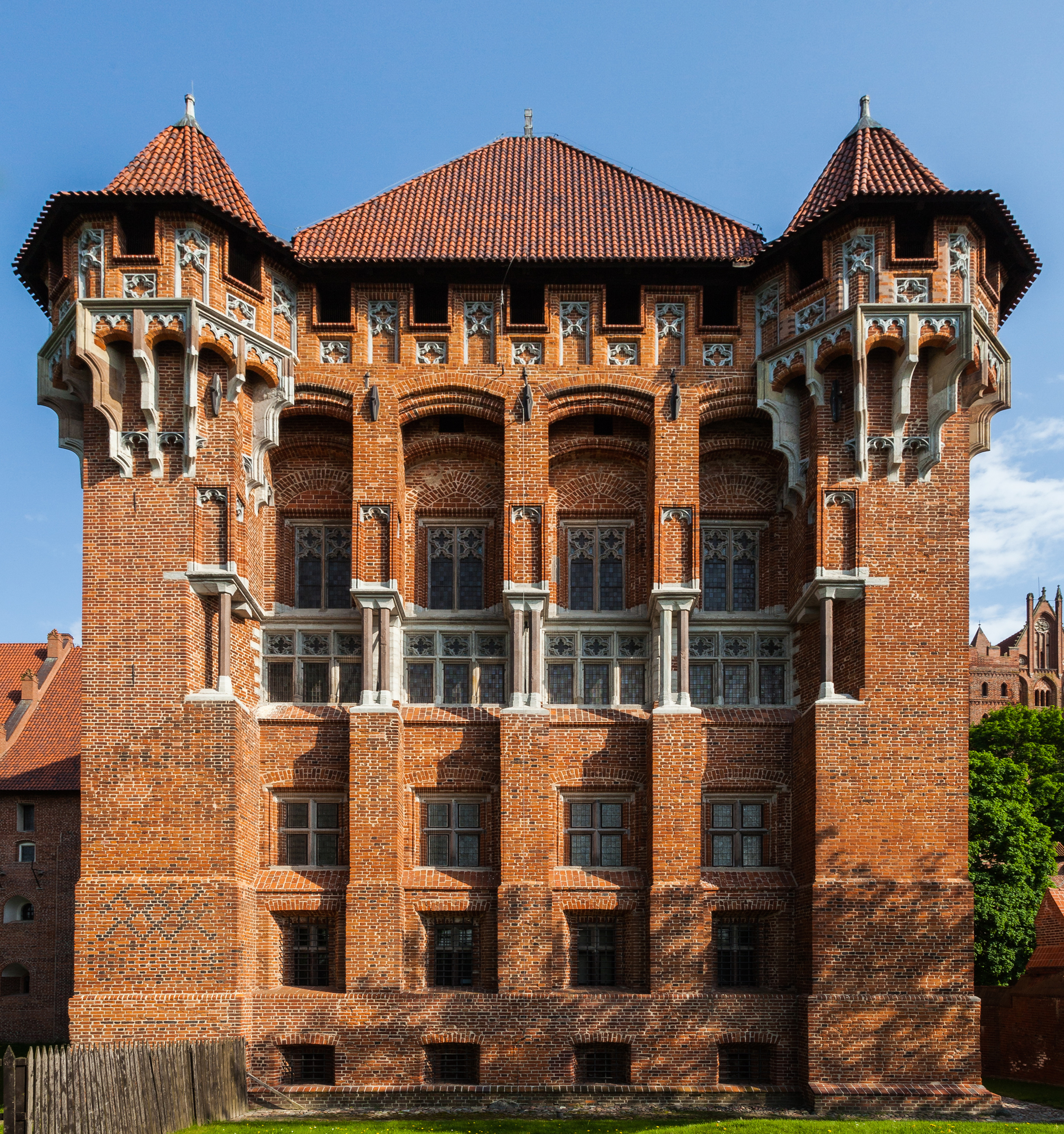
Malbork Castle, Brick Gothic, 13th century

The first Gothic structures in Poland were built in the 13th century in Silesia. The most important churches from this time are the cathedral in Wrocław and the Collegiate Church of the Holy Cross and St Bartholomew in the same city, as well as the St Hedwig's Chapel in the Cistercian nuns abbey in Trzebnica and the castle chapel in Racibórz. The Gothic architecture in Silesia was further developed in the 14th century in the series of parish churches in the most important cities of the region (churches of St. Mary Magdalene, St. Elizabeth, St Mary on the Sand and St Dorothea in Wrocław, St. Nicholas' Church in Brzeg, Saints Stanislaus and Wenceslaus Church in Świdnica, Saints Peter and Paul church in Strzegom). The most important secular building of the gothic period in Silesia is the Wrocław Town Hall, initially built in the 13th century and enlarged and rebuilt in later centuries, mainly in the late 15th century.

The 14th century is also the heyday of the Gothic in Lesser Poland, where such structures were built like the gothic Wawel Cathedral in Kraków, the series of basilical churches in the same city (churches of St. Mary, Holy Trinity, Corpus Christi and St. Catherine) and many hall churches outside the capital city (e.g. Wiślica, Szydłów, Stopnica and Sandomierz). In the same time the Greater Poland's cathedrals in Poznań and Gniezno as well as the Latin Cathedral in Lviv (now Ukraine) were built.

Many Gothic structures were also built in Royal Prussia before and after the incorporation of the region into the Polish Crown according to the Second Peace of Thorn (1466). The most important sights are the castles of the Teutonic Order in Malbork, Gniew and Radzyń Chełmiński and the town halls and churches of Toruń (town hall, the churches of St. John the Baptist and St. John the Evangelist and St. James the Greater), Chełmno, Pelplin, Frombork and Gdańsk (town hall and churches of St. Mary, St. Catherine and Holy Trinity).

Late Gothic is represented by such buildings like the Collegium Maius of the Jagiellonian University in Krakow or the St. Mary's Church in Poznań and the Corpus Christi Church in Biecz. Moreover, in the 1st half of the 16th century diamond vaults were popular, especially in Masovia (St Michael's Church in Łomża, the cloister of the St. Anne's Church in Warsaw) and in Royal Prussia (e.g. in the aforementioned churches of Gdańsk and in the St James’s Concathedral Basilica in Olsztyn).

There are also some examples of the post-Gothic architecture (germ. Nachgotik) from the 17th century, like the choir of the St. Hyacinth's Church in Warsaw or the Bernardine monastery in Przasnysz.

In the modern Poland there are also some examples of Gothic architecture of the former Duchy of Pomerania like the Kamień Pomorski Cathedral, Szczecin Cathedral and the St. Mary's Church in Stargard.

=== Renaissance ===
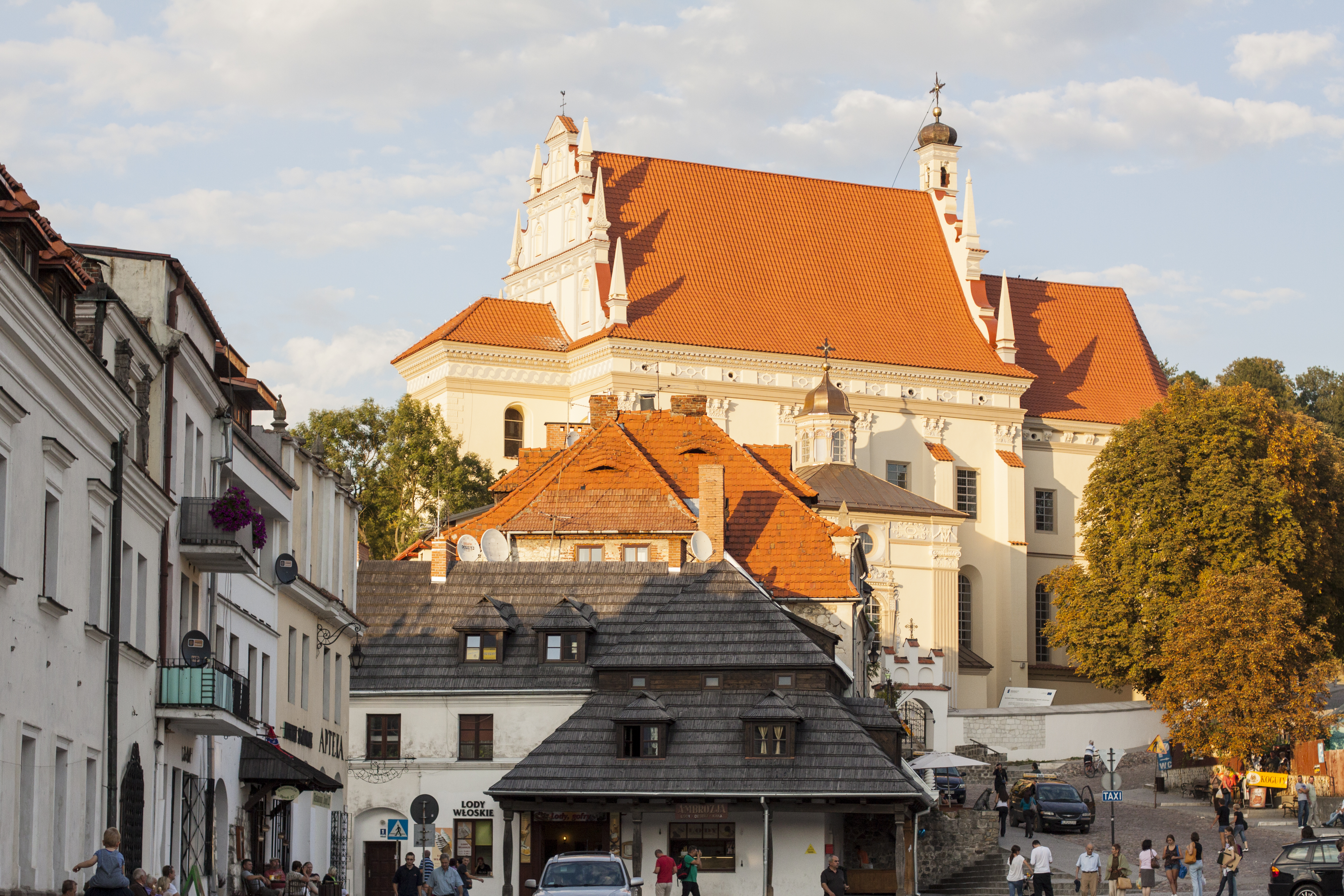
Church of St. John Baptist and St. Bartholomew in Kazimierz Dolny, 1610–1613

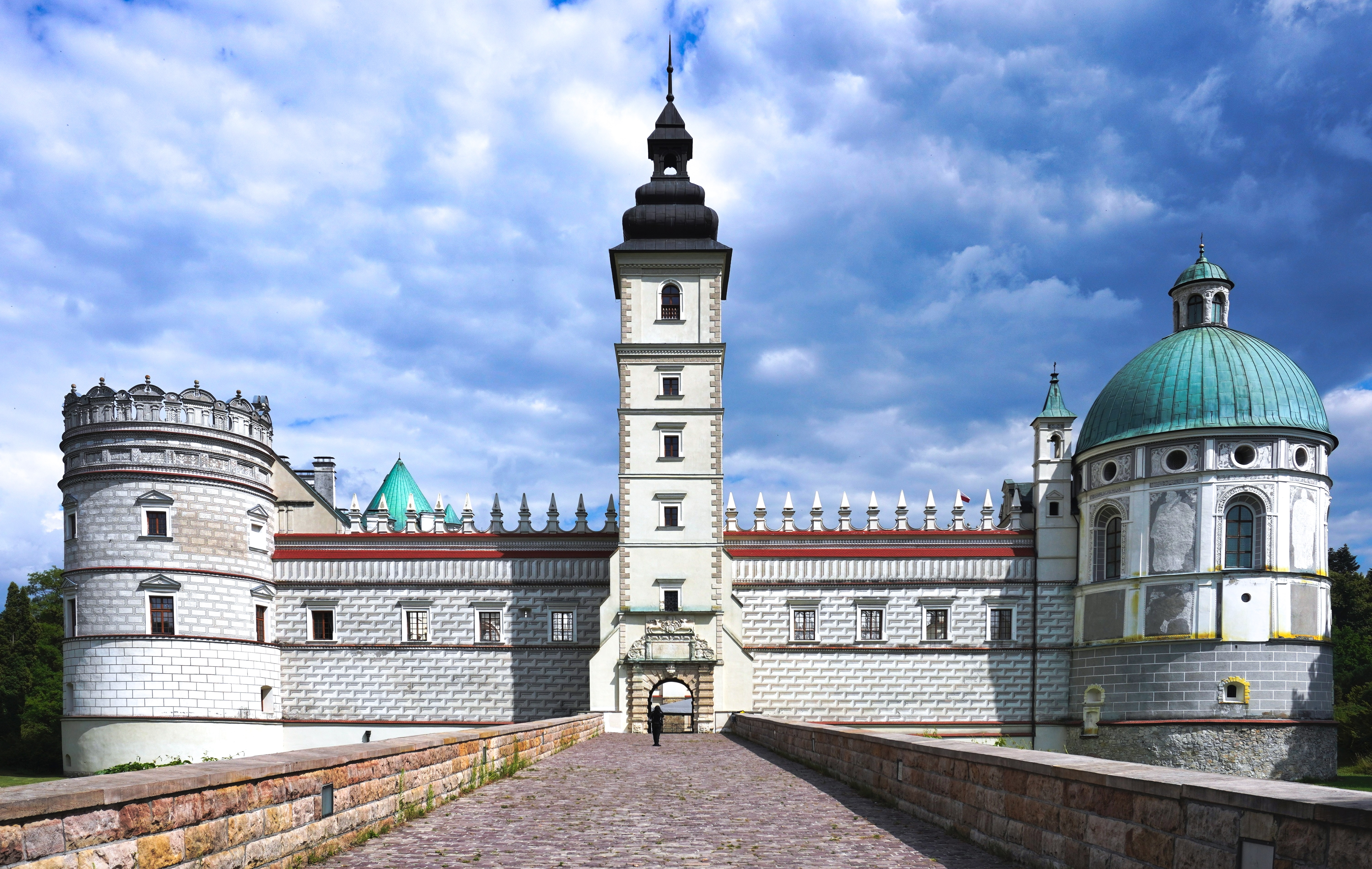
Krasiczyn Castle, 1631

The Renaissance came to Poland as a courtly fashion under King Sigismund I, who became familiar with this style in Buda, at the court of his Hungarian uncle. Sigismund invited Italian craftsmen from Buda to Kraków, where they created the first example of Italian Renaissance art in Poland, the Tomb of John I Albert in the Wawel Cathedral (1502–06) and remodelled in the new manner the Wawel Castle. Another masterpiece of this period is also the Sigismund's Chapel at the Wawel Cathedral.

In the following decades, Renaissance architecture was especially popular in secular architecture. Notable examples include the cloth hall in Krakow, numerous town halls (e.g. in Poznań, Tarnów, Sandomierz and Chełmno), town houses surrounding market squares (e.g. in Zamość, Kazimierz Dolny, Lublin, Warsaw and Lviv) and castles, such as Baranów Sandomierski Castle, Krasiczyn Castle and Krzyżtopór Castle.

In religious architecture Renaissance influences are evident in the Zamość Cathedral, the church of St. Bartholomew and John the Baptist in Kazimierz Dolny, the Bernardine churches of Lublin and Lviv (now Ukraine) numerous synagogues, including the Old Synagogue in Krakow and Zamość Synagogue. In Mazovia, a distinctive group of churches inspired by local Romanesque traditions was developed in towns such as Płock, Pułtusk, Brochów and Brok. Late mannierism from the time of the Counter-Reformation is represented by the Kalwaria Zebrzydowska calvary complex.

In northern Poland, Renaissance architecture developed under the influence of Dutch Mannierism. Prominent examples include the Great Armoury, Green Gate and Old Town City Hall in Gdańsk, as well as numerous town houses in Gdańsk, Toruń and Elbląg (such as the Jost von Kampen house in Elbląg).

Within the borders of present-day Poland, there are also significant Renaissance buildings originally constructed in the lands of the then Holy Roman Empire. Key examples include the castle in Szczecin, the castle and the town hall in Brzeg and the parish church in Żórawina.

=== Baroque architecture ===
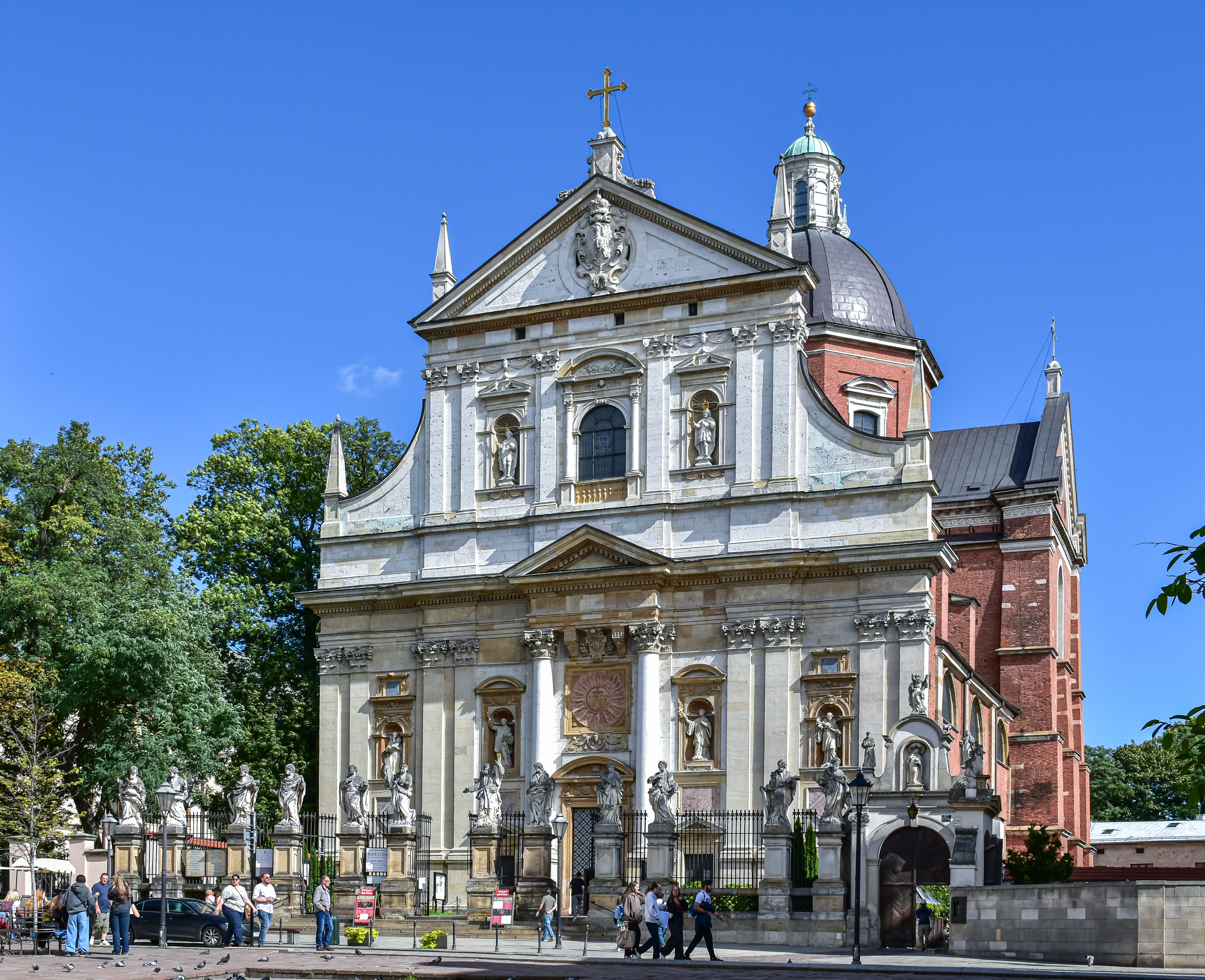
Church of Saints Apostles Peter and Paul in Kraków, 1619

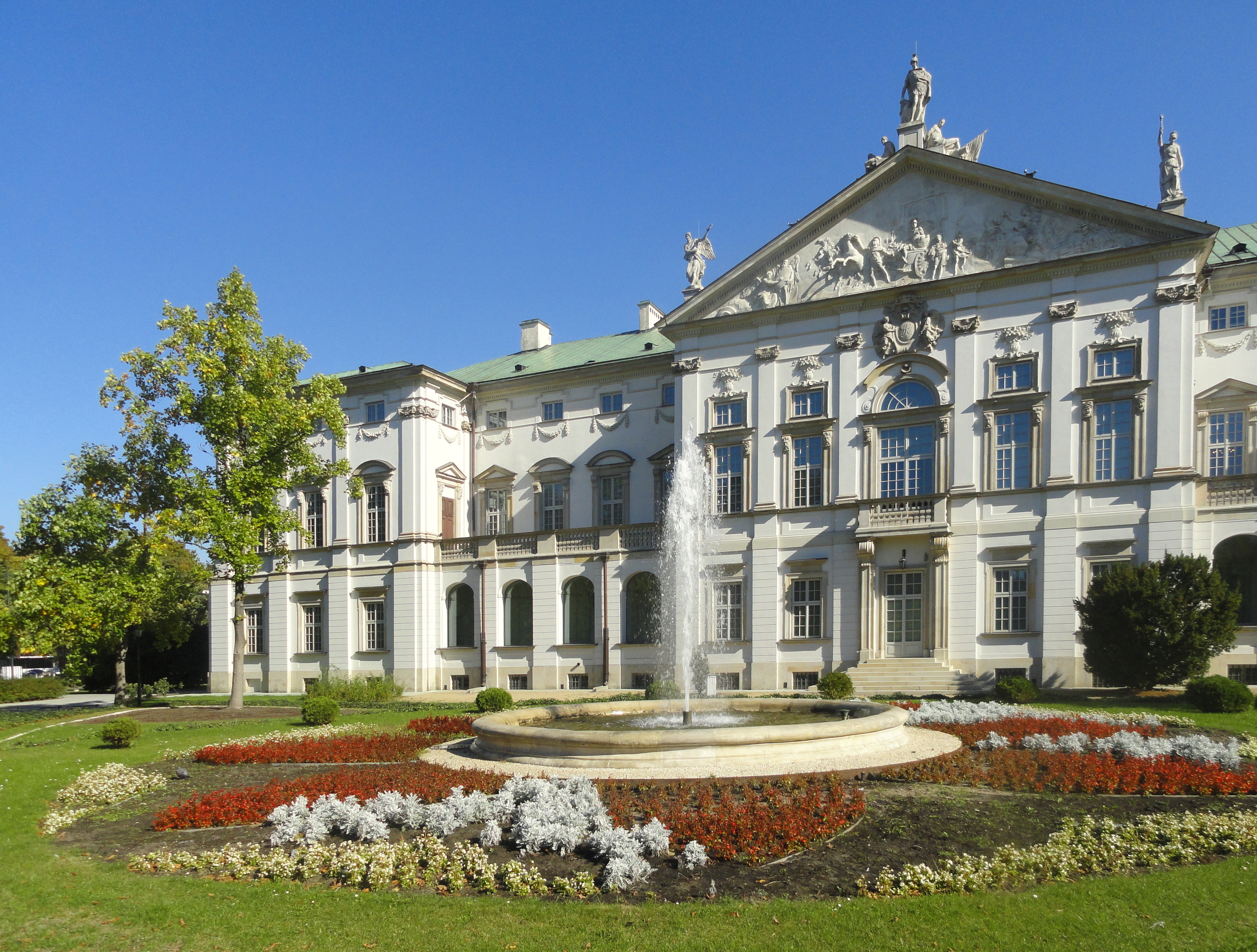
Krasiński Palace in Warsaw, 1695

The early Baroque in Poland was dominated by the Roman influences (the jesuite churches in Nesvizh, Krakow and Lviv, as well as the Camaldolese Monastery in Kraków). In the second half of the 17th century the influences of the Dutch Baroque architecture were also important thanks to the Tylman van Gameren (Krasiński Palace and St. Kazimierz Church in Warsaw, St. Anne's Church in Kraków, Royal Chapel in Gdańsk).

The most important structures of the Polish late Baroque were built in the former Eastern Borderlands, like the churches of St. Peter and St. Paul and St. Johns in Vilnius (now Lithuania), the St. George's Cathedral and the Dominican Church in Lviv (now Ukraine) as well as the Basilian Church and Monastery in Berezwecz (now Belarus) and the Saint Sophia Cathedral in Polotsk (now Belarus). Other key buildings of this period are the Piarists Church and the Church of the Conversion of St. Paul in Krakow, the Visitationist Church in Warsaw, the Greater Poland's abbeys in Głogówko near Gostyń and in Ląd as well as the Święta Lipka pilgrimage church in Warmia. Moreover, one of the most outstanding examples of Polish Baroque Jewish architecture is the Great Synagogue in Włodawa.

The secular Baroque architecture in Poland is represented by the Ujazdów Castle, Royal Castle and Wilanów Palace in Warsaw, Palace of the Kraków Bishops in Kielce as well as Branicki Palace in Białystok. Other important structures are also the palaces in Radzyń Podlaski, Rogalin and Rydzyna. In Royal Prussia the most important example is the Abbot's Palace in Oliwa (district of Gdańsk).

In modern Poland there are also important examples of the Baroque architecture in Silesia, which was then a part of the Habsburg monarchy. They include i.a. the main building of the University of Wrocław, the Protestant Churches of Peace in Świdnica and Jawor, the former Protestant (now Catholic) Exaltation of the Holy Cross Church in Jelenia Góra, the Cistercian monasteries in Lubiąż, Krzeszów and Henryków as well as the churches by Kilian Ignaz Dientzenhofer in Legnica (Church of St. John the Baptist built together with Christoph Dientzenhofer) and in Legnickie Pole.

=== Neoclassicism ===
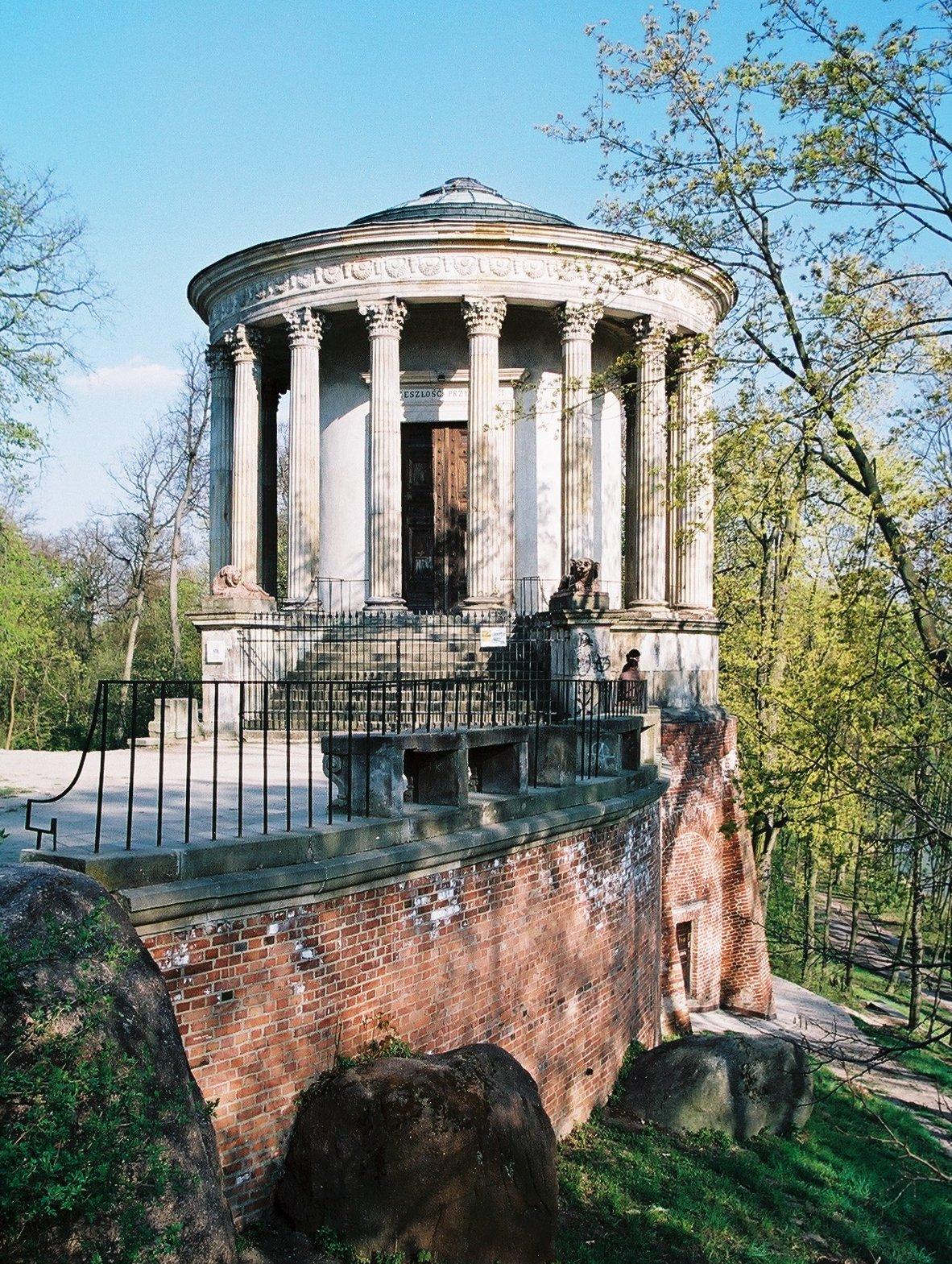
Temple of the Sibyl in Puławy by Piotr Aigner, 1801

Neoclassicism dominated Polish architecture during the second half of the 18th and first third of the 19th century as a manifestation of Enlightenment rationalism. New stylistics came from France, Italy, and partly from Germany as a reflection of general admiration only for the newly discovered Greco-Roman antiquity. The most important structures from this period are the palaces On the Isle and Królikarnia in Warsaw by Domenico Merlini, the Lutheran Holy Trinity Church in the same city by Szymon Bogumił Zug and the cathedral in Vilnius (now Lithuania) by Wawrzyniec Gucewicz.

Late neoclassicism, which was chronologically connected with the end of the Napoleonic Wars and capture of the former Duchy of Warsaw by the Russian Empire in 1815, was characterized by significant volumes of construction, large representative buildings, which set a new, large scale of squares and streets of Warsaw like the Saxon Palace. The leading architect of the late neoclassicism in Poland is Italian Antonio Corazzi. His main buildings in Warsaw include Staszic Palace, the buildings on the Bank Square and the Grand Theatre. Other important architects were Piotr Aigner (the palace and the pavilions in Puławy landscape garden, St. Alexander's Church in Warsaw, Presidential Palace) and Jakub Kubicki (Belvedere Palace in Warsaw).

Apart from Congress Poland, worth mentioning are also the Raczyński Library in Poznań (designed probably by Charles Percier and Pierre-François-Léonard Fontaine) and the Wybrzeże Theater in Gdańsk (after the World War II reconstructed in modern form).

=== Style revivals ===
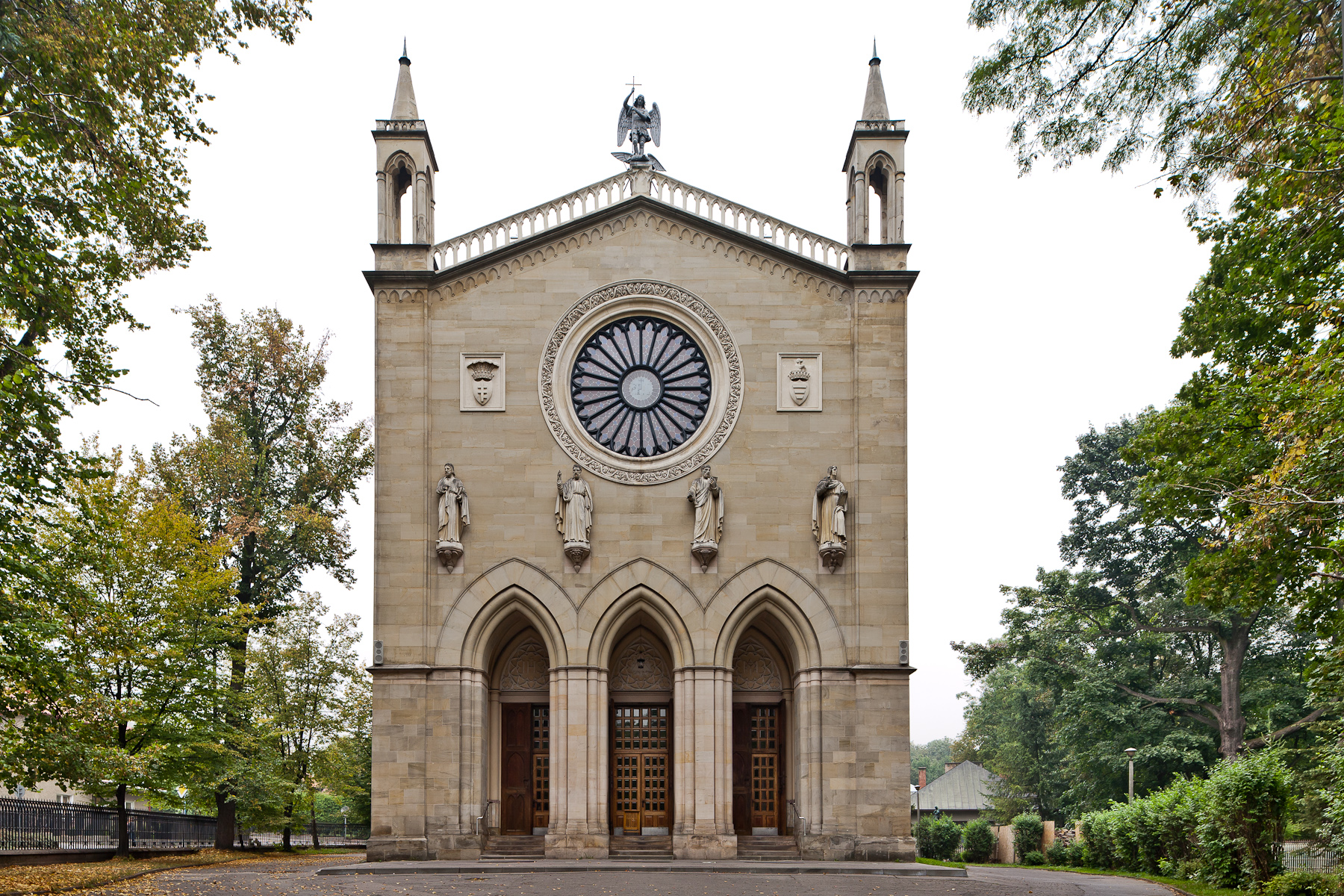
Neo-Gothic Church of St. Martin of Tours in Krzeszowice, 1844

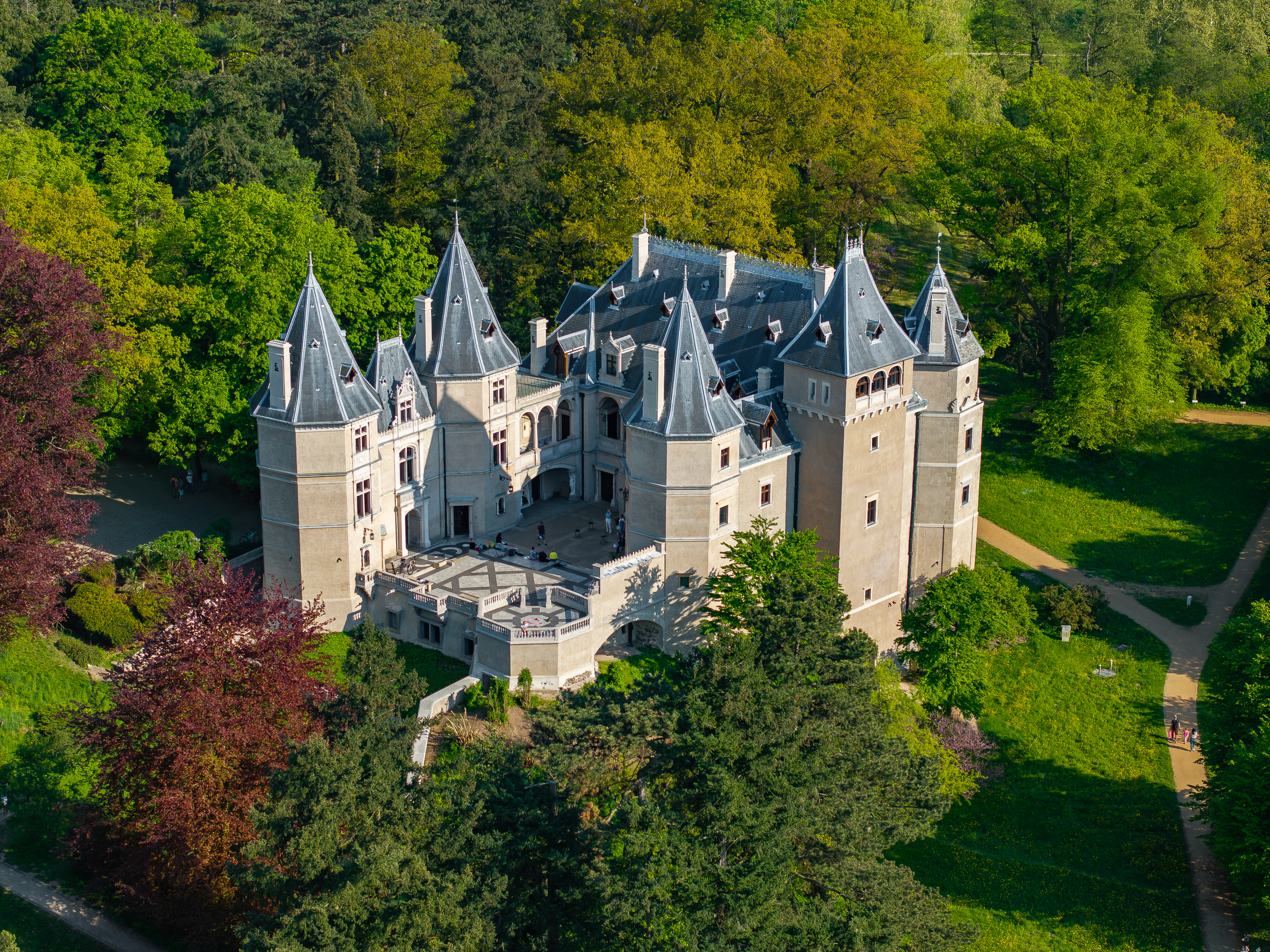
Gołuchów Castle near Poznań, rebuilt in Renaissance Revival style, 1885

The territory of the former Polish state remained divided between Prussia (Germany), Russia, and the Austrian (Austro-Hungarian) Empire and developed unevenly.

The architecture of Kraków and Galicia at that time was oriented towards the Viennese model. The experience of Vienna Ring Road was successfully applied in Kraków where Planty Park was created. Stylistically, it was an eclecticism dominated by Neo-Gothic (Collegium Novum of the Jagiellonian University) and Neo-Renaissance (Słowacki Theatre). Similar stylistics dominated also in Lviv (Lviv Opera, Lviv Polytechnic and the building of the Diet of Galicia and Lodomeria, now housing the University of Lviv), Warsaw (National Museum of Ethnography, Warsaw Polytechnic, Zachęta National Gallery of Art, Bristol Hotel) and Łódź (Izrael Poznański Palace).

In the church architecture, the most important was Neo-Gothic, promoted by architects like Józef Pius Dziekoński (Karol Scheibler's Chapel in Łódź, St. Florian's Cathedral in Warsaw, Białystok Cathedral, Radom Cathedral), Konstanty Wojciechowski (Częstochowa Cathedral), Jan Sas-Zubrzycki (St. Joseph's Church in Krakow) and Teodor Talowski (Church of Sts. Olha and Elizabeth in Lviv, Church of St. Mary in Ternopil).

Apart from Polish architects, also some important German and Austrian architects were active in the partitioned Poland, e.g. Karl Friedrich Schinkel (St. Martin's Church in Krzeszowice, the Kórnik Castle, the Radziwiłł Palace in Antonin), Franz Schwechten (Imperial Castle in Poznań and the Lutheran Church in Łódź), Friedrich Hitzig (Kronenberg Palace in Warsaw, demolished in 1962), Theophil Hansen (House of military invalids in Lviv, now Ukraine), Heinrich von Ferstel (Lutheran Church in Bielsko Biała) and Fellner & Helmer (Goetz Palace in Brzesko, Hotel George and Noble Casino in Lviv, theaters in Bielsko-Biała, Cieszyn and Toruń).

Within the borders of the modern Poland are also important examples built in at the time Prussian Silesia and Prussian Pomerania, like the Chrobry Embankment (germ. Hakenterrasse) in Szczecin and the works of Karl Friedrich Schinkel (town hall in Kołobrzeg, Kamieniec Ząbkowicki Palace), Friedrich August Stüler (Royal Palace of Wrocław, St. Barbara's Church in Gliwice) and Alexis Langer (St. Mary's Church in Katowice, St. Michael Archangel's Church in Wrocław).

In the era of capitalism, many factory owners' villas and palaces are built, as well as numerous workers' housing estates and industrial buildings.

==== Art Nouveau and Folk Architecture ====
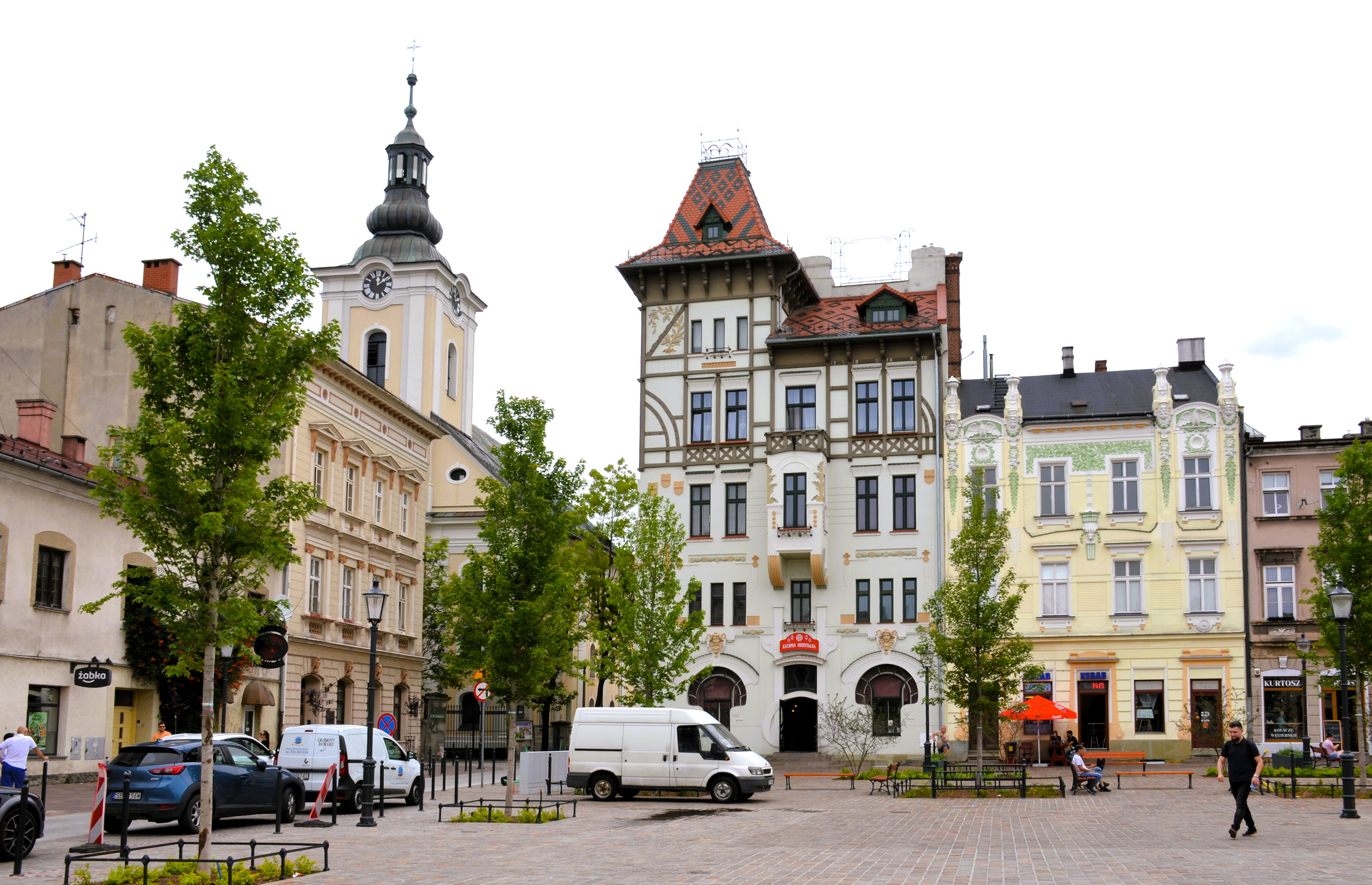
Frog House (centre) in Bielsko-Biała, 1903

Art Nouveau emerged as an attempt to abandon stylization and eclecticism, invent a new architectural style that would meet the spirit of the time. The most important centre of this style was Galicia, where many buildings were built under the influence of the Vienna Secession. The most important architects were Franciszek Mączyński in Krakow (Palace of Art, House Under the Globe, Basilica of the Sacred Heart of Jesus) and Władysław Sadłowski in Lviv (Lviv railway station, Lviv's Philharmonic, Industrial School). Moreover, in Krakow important are also the interiors designed by Stanisław Wyspiański in the House of the Krakow Medical Society and by Józef Mehoffer in the House Under the Globe.

In Bielsko-Biała some architects direct from Vienna were active, like Leopold Bauer (Saint Nicholas' Cathedral, house at 51 Stojałowskiego Street) and Max Fabiani (house at 1 Barlickiego Street). Other important examples in the city include also the so-called Frog House.

In Congress Poland the Art Nouveau is represented by e.g. the Leopold Kindermann's Villa and the Poznanski's Mausoleum in Łódź, the bank building at 47 Sienkiewicza Street in Kielce and the early-modernist Eagles House in Warsaw.

Polish architects from the 1890s were also discovering folk motives. The leading figure of this trend was Stanisław Witkiewicz, the founder of the Zakopane Style. Folk-inspired were also many World War I Eastern Front cemeteries in Galicia, many of them designed by Dušan Jurkovič.

== Modern architecture ==
=== Interwar period ===
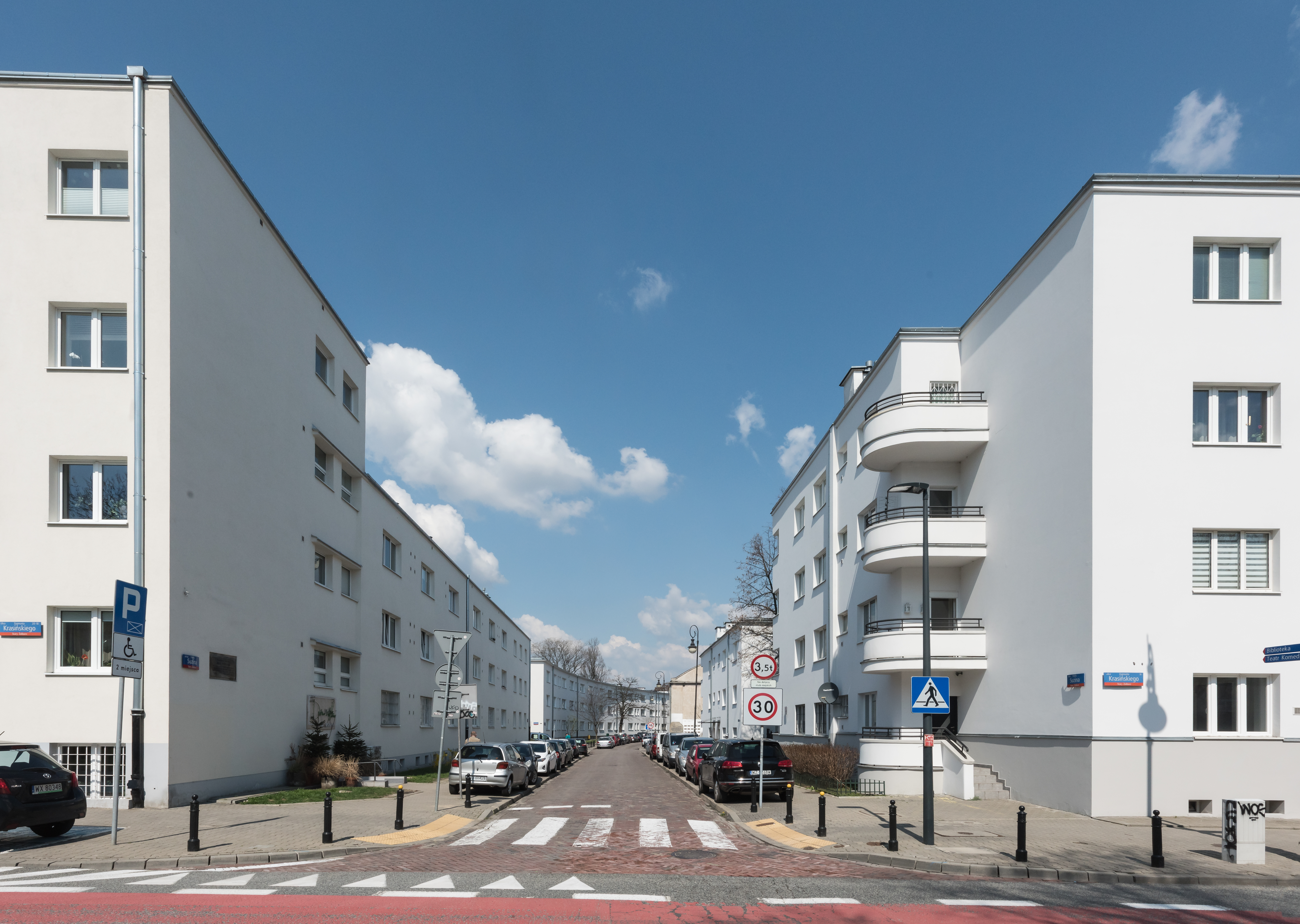
WSM housing estate in Żoliborz, north Warsaw, 1920s

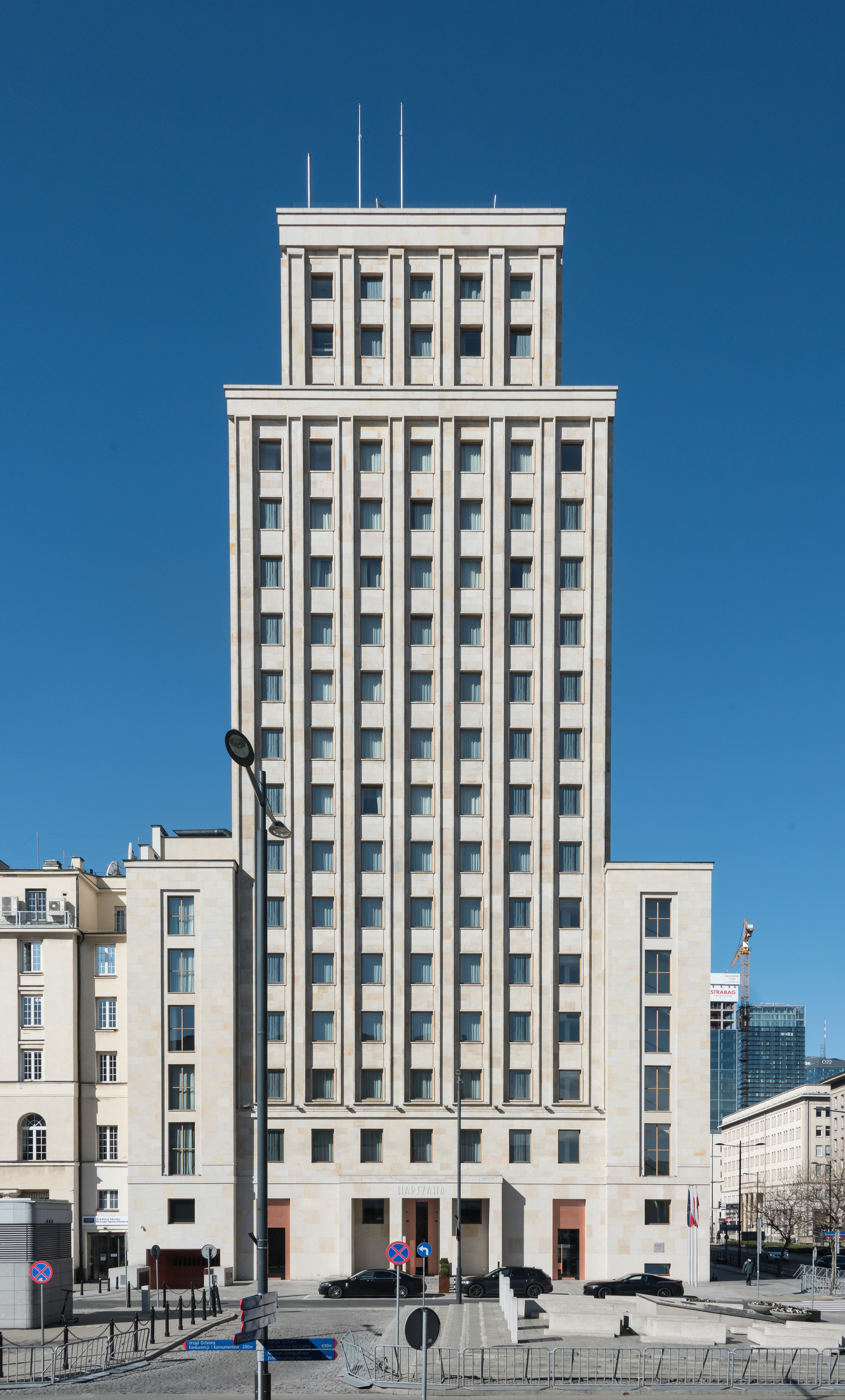
Prudential House, 1933

Poland's regaining of independence marked a new era in art, where modern architecture developed on a large scale. In its early phase, it often combinined achievements of functionalism with elements of classicism. The most important architects of this period include Adolf Szyszko-Bohusz (PKO BP Building on Wielopole Street in Krakow), Marian Lalewicz (Polish Geological Institute in Warsaw, Bank Building at 50 Nowogrodzka Street in Warsaw, PKP Polskie Linie Kolejowe headquarters in Targowa Street in Warsaw), Bohdan Pniewski (Patria guesthouse in Krynica-Zdrój, court at 127 Solidarności Avenue in Warsaw) and Wacław Krzyżanowski (AGH University of Science and Technology, Jagiellonian Library in Krakow). Other notable examples include also the buildings of the Polish Parliament (Sejm) in Warsaw and the Silesian Parliament in Katowice.

Important were also influences of the Polish folk art and the Expressionist architecture, clearly visible in the works of Jan Koszczyc Witkiewicz (e.g. Warsaw School of Economics), in the Polish pavilion at International Exhibition in Paris (1925) or in the St. Roch's Church in Białystok. These tendencies can also be observed in the town hall in Stanisławów (today Ivano-Frankivsk, Ukraine) as well as in the building at 6 Inwalidów Square in Kraków, inspired by the Chilehaus.

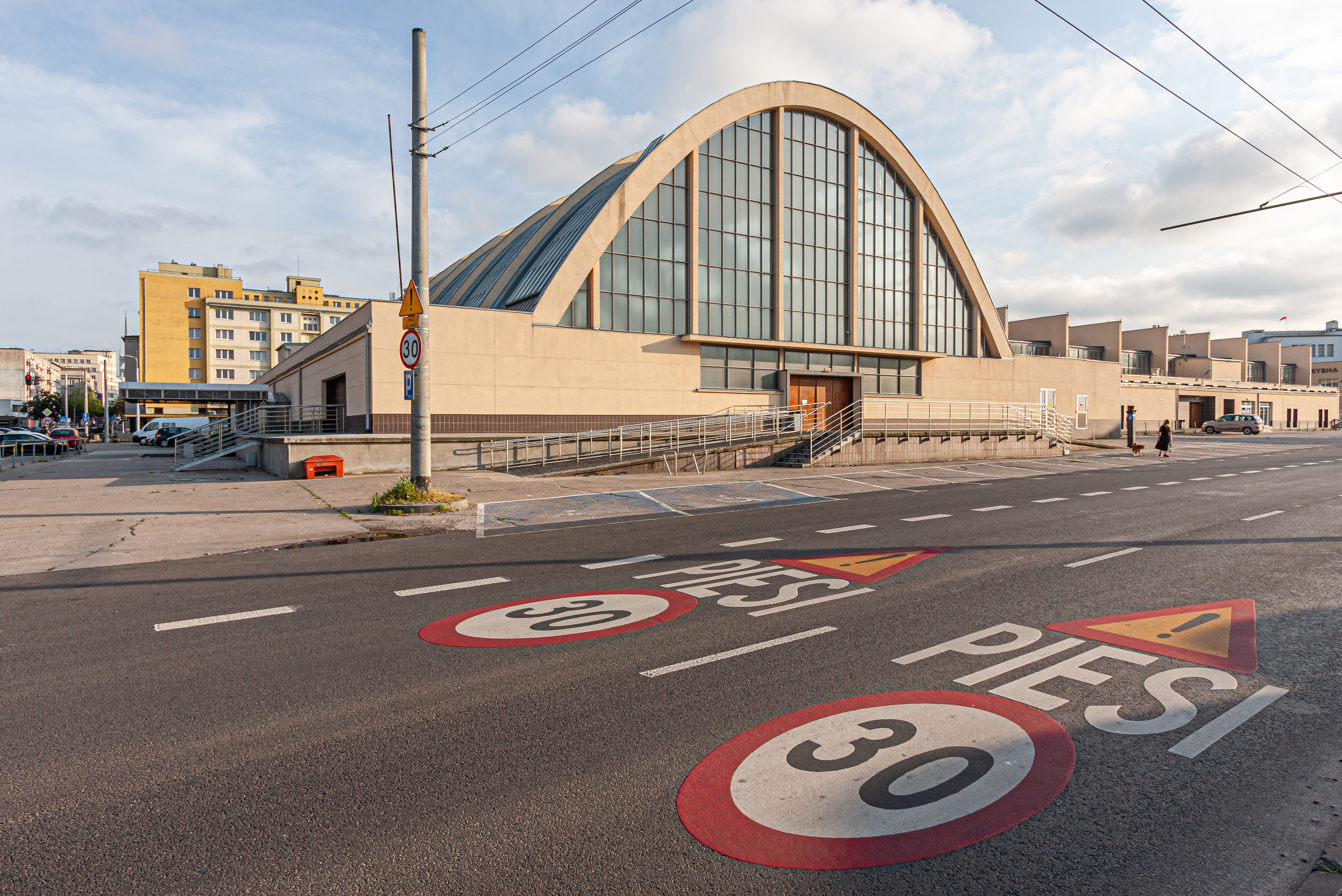
City Market Hall in Gdynia, 1938

Examples of Polish constructivism and international style include numerous housing complexes and modern residential houses built by architects Barbara Brukalska and Stanisław Brukalski (own house at 8 Niegolewskiego Street in Warsaw, WSM housing estate in Żoliborz, Warsaw), Bohdan Lachert (own house at 9 Katowicka Street in Warsaw), Józef Szanajca, Helena and Szymon Syrkus (WSM housing estate in Rakowiec, Warsaw) or Juliusz Żórawski (houses at 28 Puławska Street, 3 Przyjaciół Avenue and 34/36 Mickiewicza Street, Warsaw). Similar avant-garde buildings and housing estates were also erected in other cities, such as the Monwiłł-Mirecki housing estate in Łódź.

Large-scale construction investments also took place in rapidly developing modern cities such as the seaport of Gdynia, Katowice, and Stalowa Wola. Key examples in Gdynia include the BGK housing complex as well as the buildings of the ZUS and the Department of Nautical Science of the Gdynia Maritime University. In Katowice, important projects included the former Silesian Parliament building and the Silesian Museum (destroyed in World War II) as well as the so-called Skyscraper. Other early skyscrapers include the Prudential House in Warsaw.

=== German modernism ===
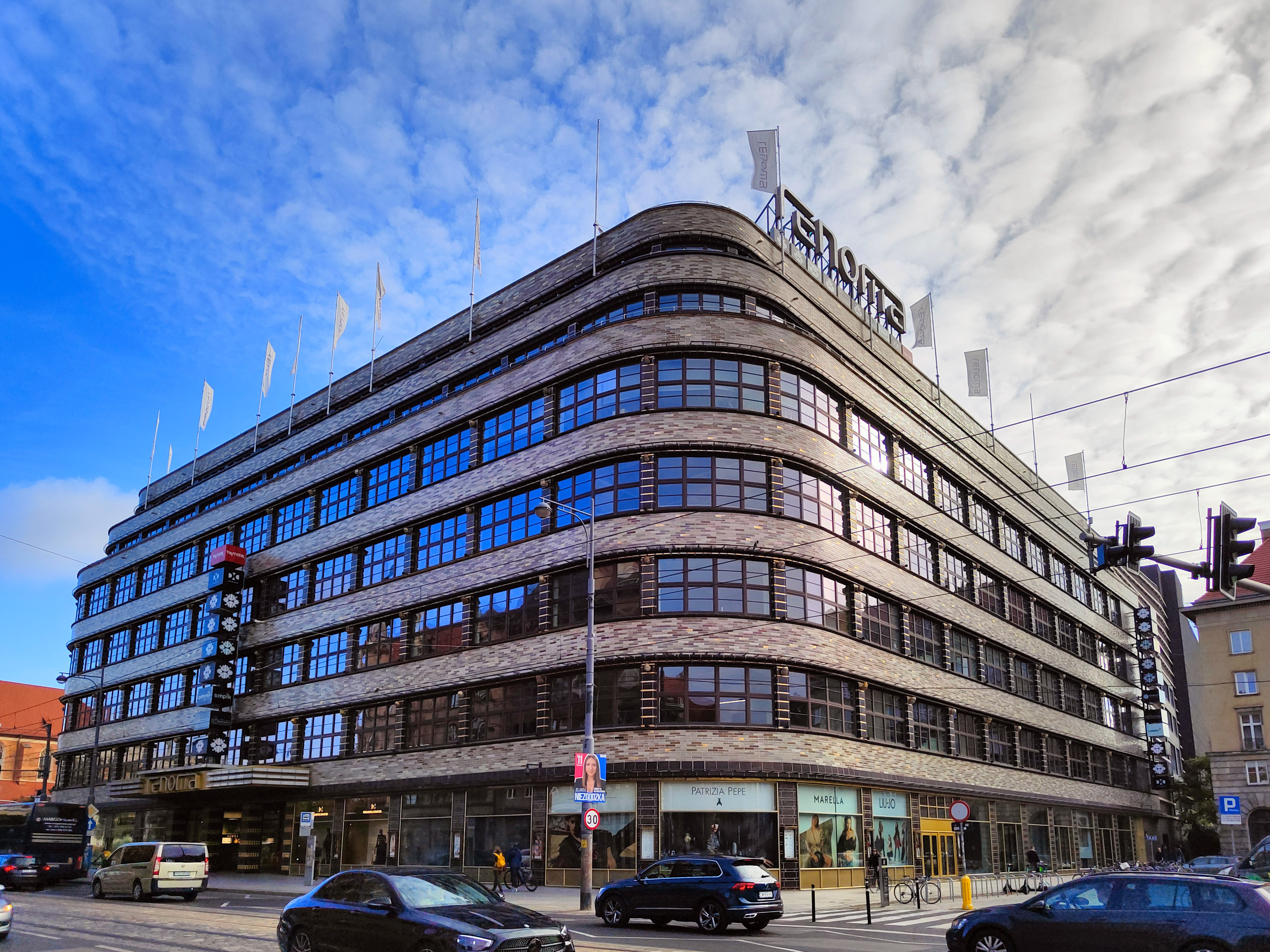
Renoma Department Store, Wrocław, 1930

Famous examples in modern Poland also include the works of German architects in Silesia, like Hans Poelzig (office building at 38-40 Ofiar Oświęcimskich Street and the Four Domes Pavilion in Wrocław), Max Berg (Centennial Hall in Wrocław), Dominikus Böhm (St Joseph's Church, Zabrze), Erich Mendelsohn (Jewish Tahara house in Olsztyn, department stores in Gliwice and Wrocław) or Hans Scharoun (the Ledigenheim at WUWA housing estate in Wrocław).

In the former Free City of Danzig Brick expressionist architecture gained popularity, represented by such works like the building of the health insurance company in the 27 Wałowa Street.

There are also some buildings built in the Nazi Germany or during the German occupation of Poland in the General Government like the Regierungspräsidium in Wrocław (now the headquarters of the Lower Silesian Voivodeship Sejmik) or the Przegorzały Castle (germ. Schloss Wartenberg) in Kraków.

=== After 1945 ===
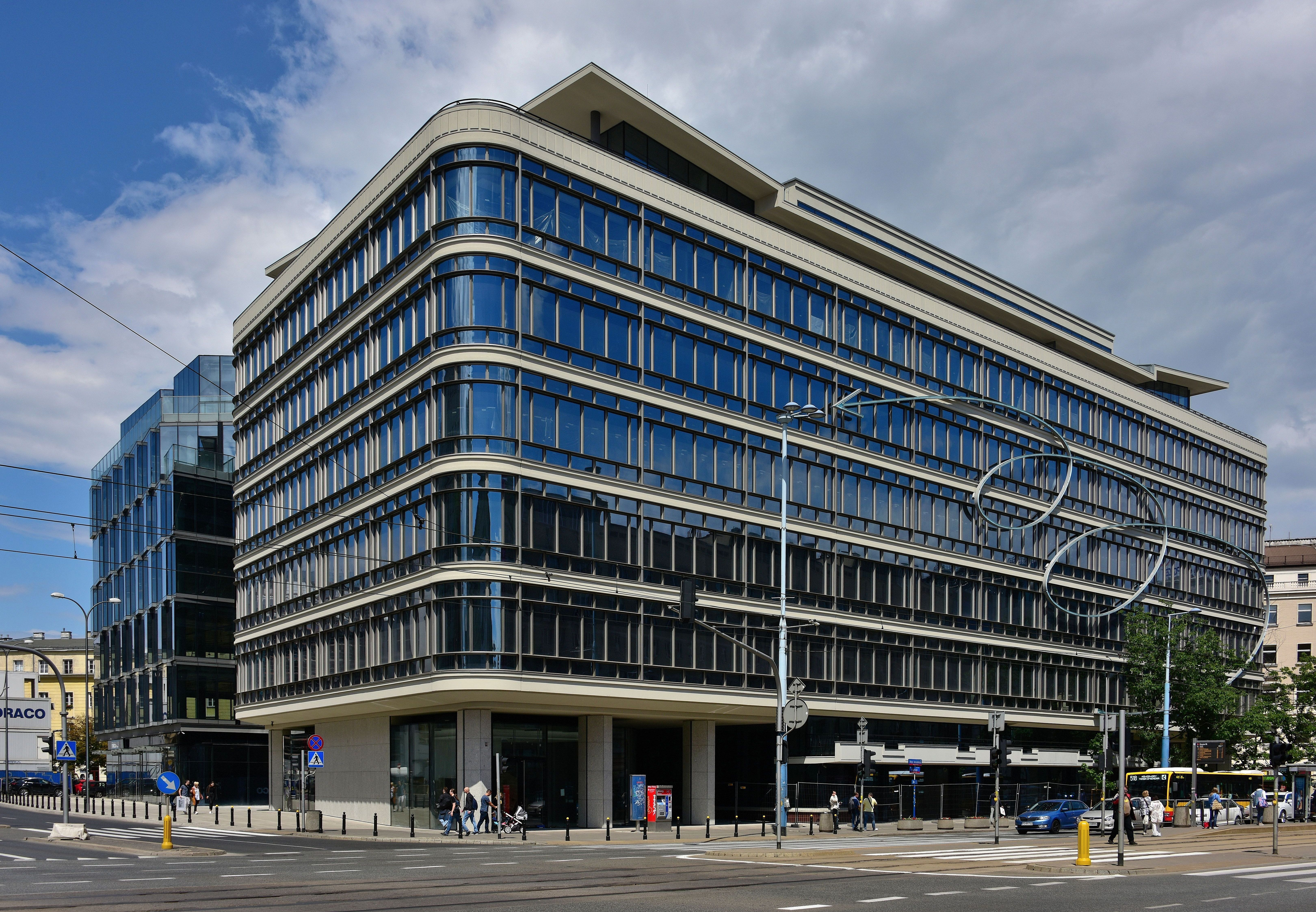
Central Department Store in Warsaw, 1952

Reconstruction of cities and historic monuments after the war had a diverse character. Notable examples of cultural restitution are the reconstructions of the old towns in Warsaw and Gdańsk. However, reconstruction of buildings in the Recovered Territories was strongly influenced by political aims of eradicating architecture perceived as German, and Prussian in particular.

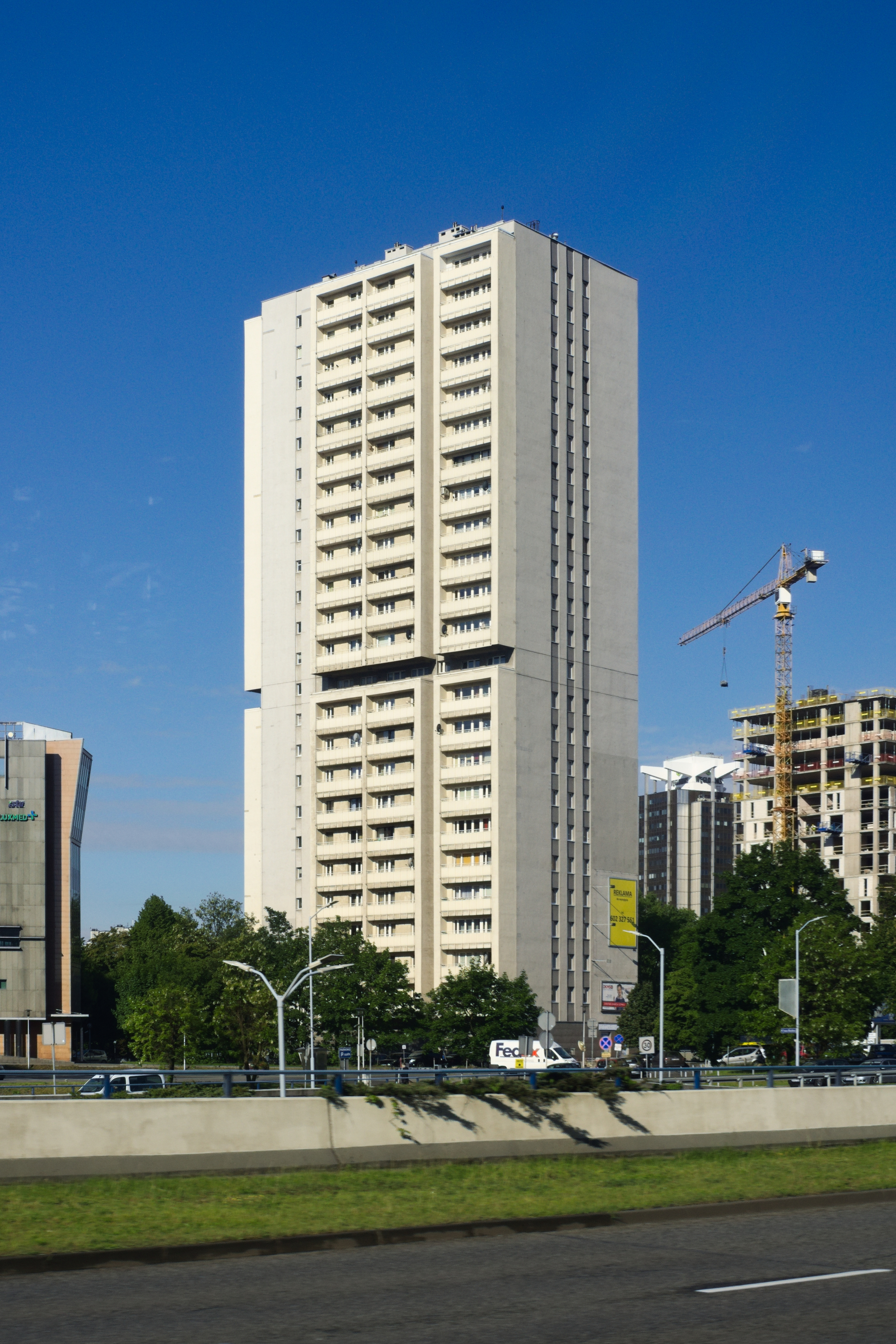
Haperowiec tower block, Katowice, 1970

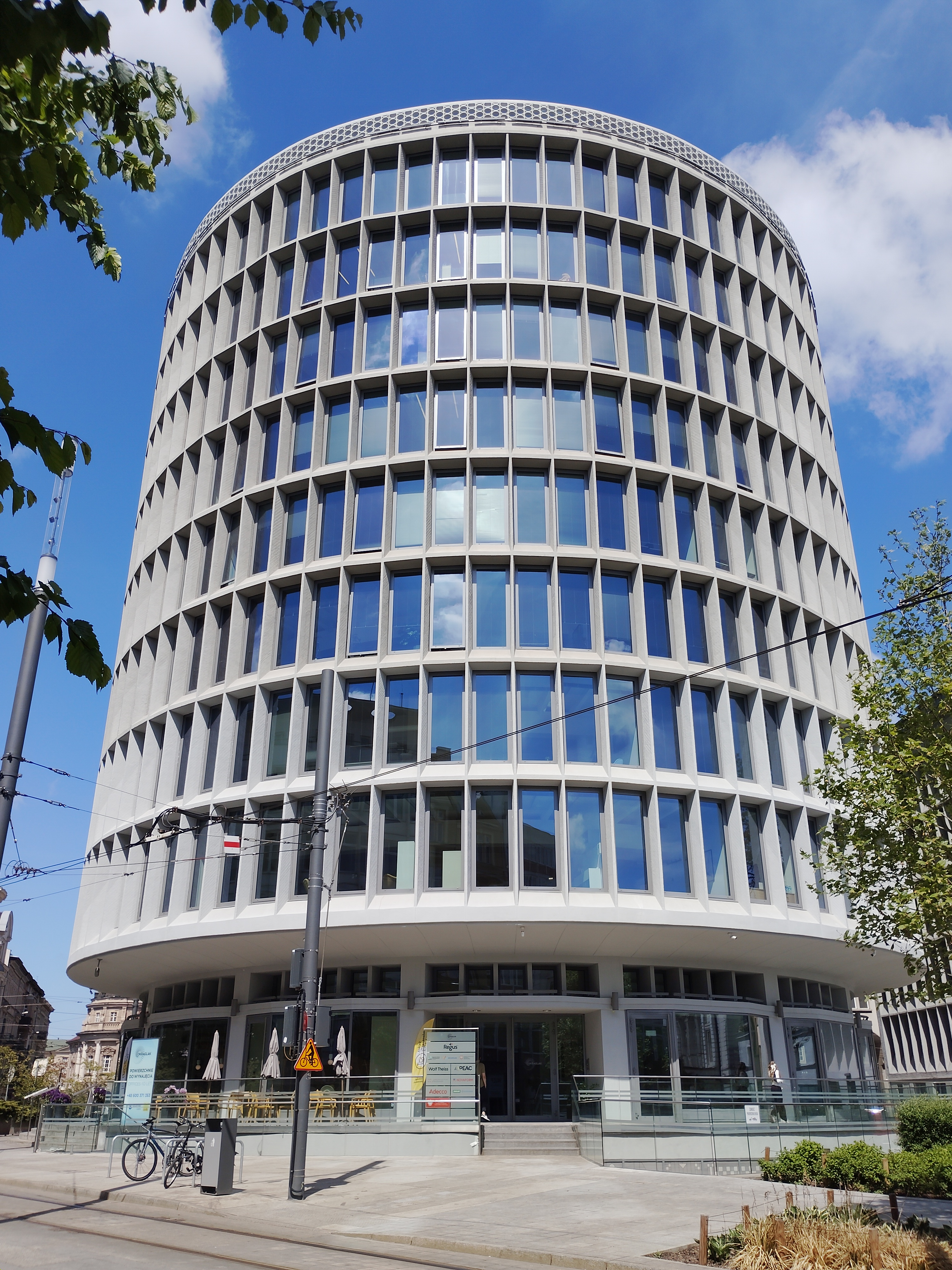
Okrąglak Department Store in Poznań, 1954

In the immediate post-war period, avant-garde architecture was initially developed. Key examples of this period include the Central Department Store in Warsaw, the Okrąglak Department Store in Poznań and the Central Statistical Office building in Warsaw. However, it was interrupted between 1949 and 1956 by the era of socialist realist. The most prominent examples of the so-called Stalinist neoclassicism are the Palace of Culture and Science by Lev Rudnev, the former Communist Party headquarters building and the Marszałkowska Dzielnica Mieszkaniowa housing estate in Warsaw as well as the planned city of Nowa Huta (initially an independent city, now part of Krakow).

After the end of socialist realism, architects could again develop the International Style. Key examples include the Biprocemwap Building, the Kijów Cinema and the Cracovia Hotel in Kraków, Ściana Wschodnia in Warsaw, railway stations in Warsaw (Centralna, Ochota, Śródmieście, Powiśle, Stadion, Wschodnia), Spodek in Katowice and the Church of Divine Mercy in Kalisz. Important examples of post-war modernism were also created at that time in mountain resorts, such as the complex of sanatoriums in Ustroń, the Main Pump Room in Krynica-Zdrój, as well as the Tadeusz Hołdys High-Mountain Meteorological Observatory on Śnieżka.

Brutalist architecture is represented by the Mezonetowiec and Plac Grunwaldzki housing estate in Wrocław, the Bunkier Sztuki Gallery of Contemporary Art, the Arka Pana Church and the former Hotel Forum in Kraków, the "hammer" (młotek) building at 8 Smolna Street in Warsaw as well as by the residential unit Superjednostka (inspired by the Unité d'habitation) and the railway station (demolished and partially rebuilt in 2010–12) in Katowice.

The growing demand for housing during the communist era led also to the construction of numerous large-scale housing estates. Among the most notable are Nowa Huta in Kraków and the Plac Grunwaldzki in Wrocław, as well as Koło II in Warsaw by Helena and Szymon Syrkus, the Osiedle Za Żelazną Bramą in Warsaw, the Falowiec in Gdańsk, the Osiedle Tysiąclecia in Katowice as well as the housing estates Przyczółek Grochowski (Warsaw), Osiedle Słowackiego (Lublin) by Oskar Nikolai Hansen and Zofia Garlińska-Hansen.

Furthermore, a notable example of the transplantation of Western early high-tech architecture to Poland is the French Embassy in Warsaw, designed by Bernard Zehrfuss (1967–71).

=== After 1989 ===
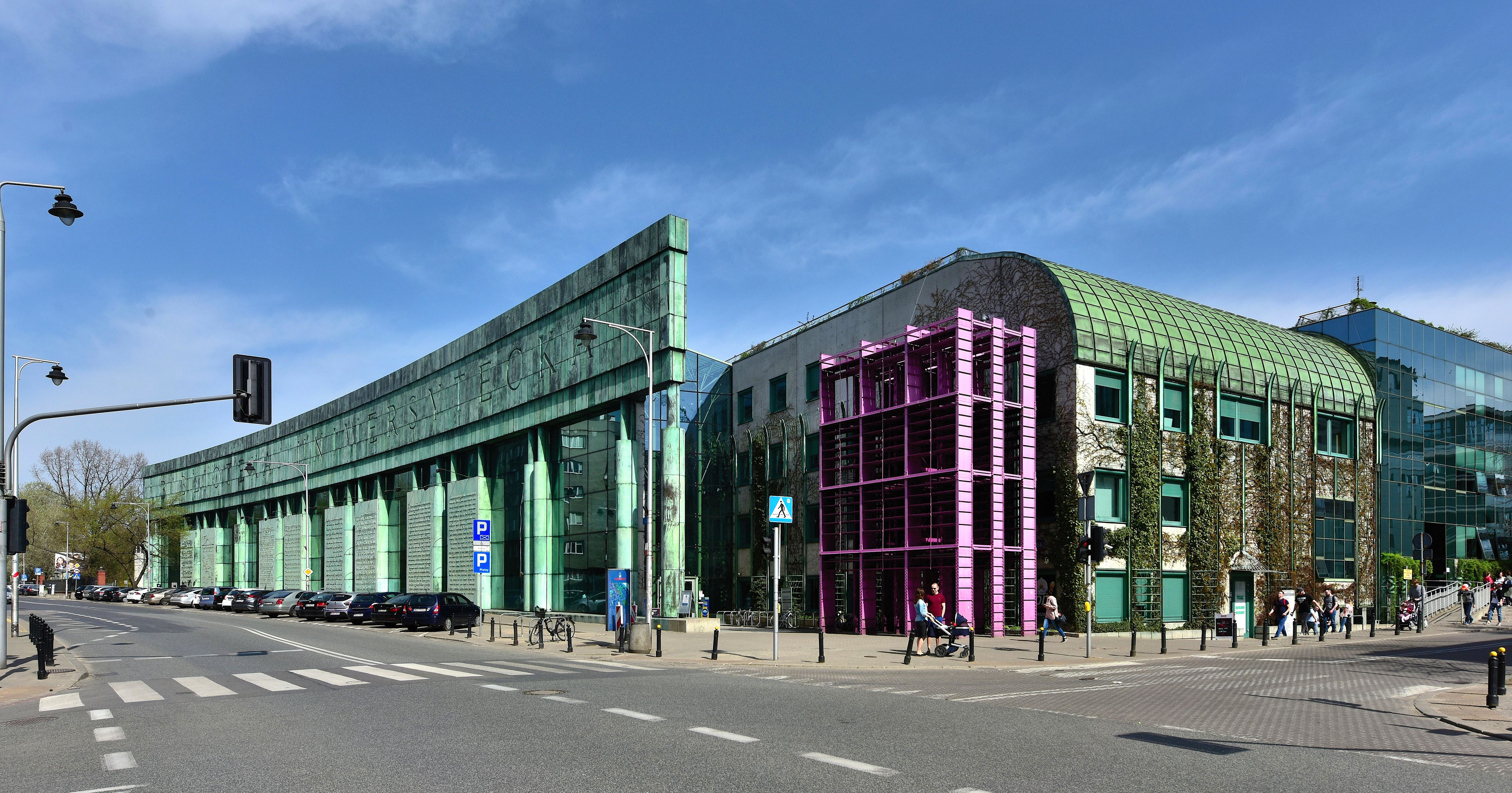
Warsaw University Library, 1998

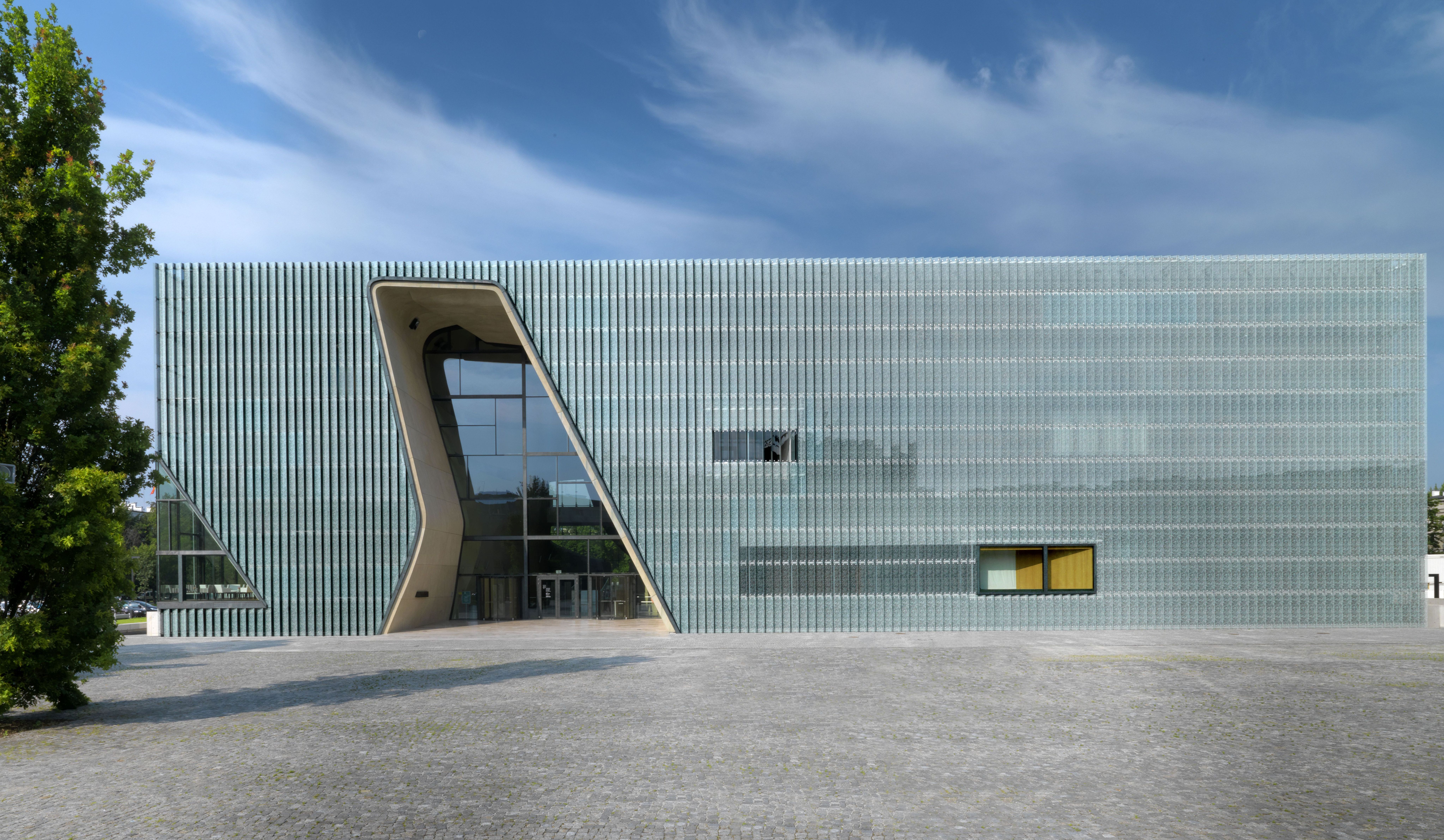
POLIN Museum of the History of Polish Jews in Warsaw, 2013

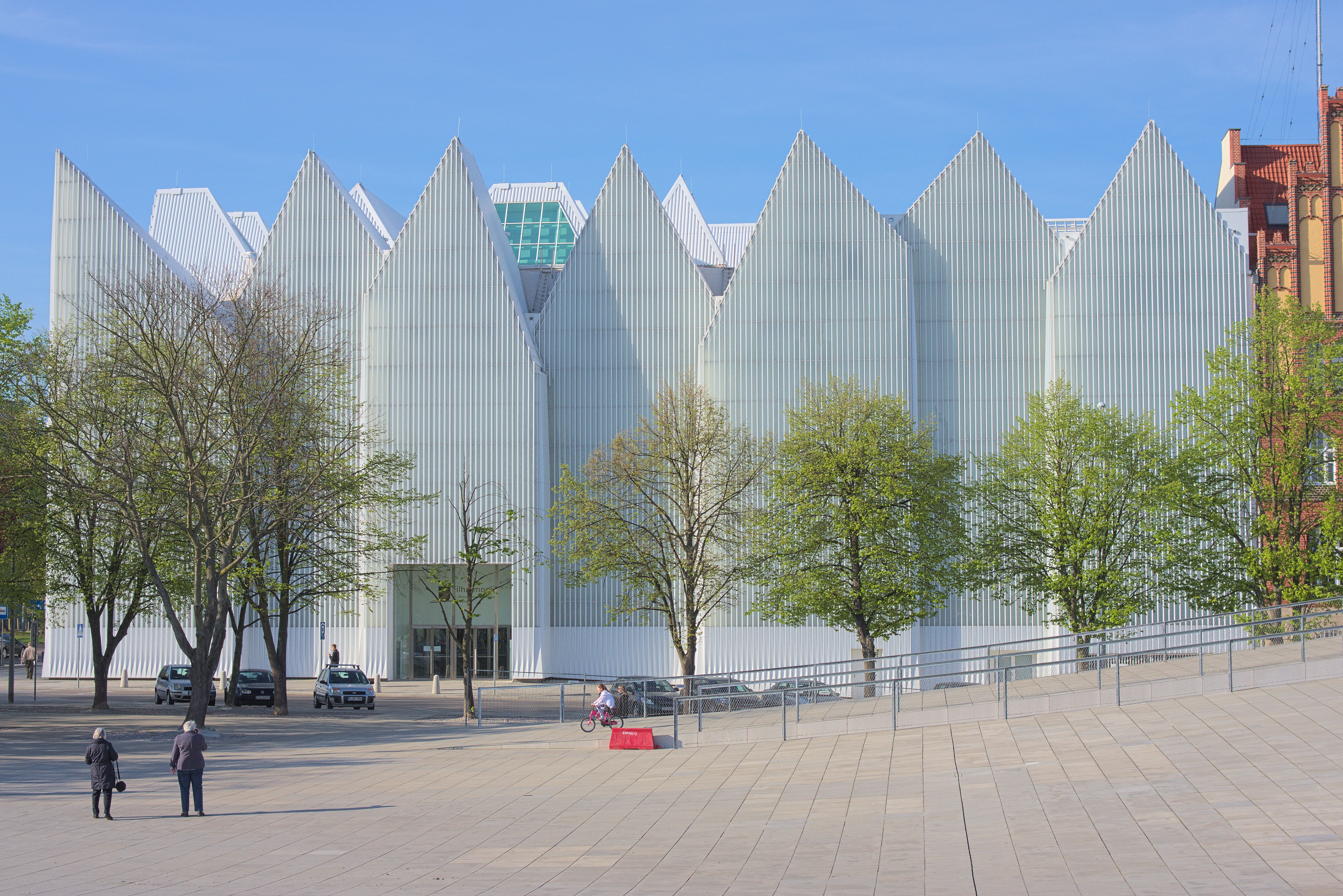
Szczecin Philharmonic, 2014

Among the most prominent contemporary Polish architects are Ryszard Jurkowski (Home Army Museum in Krakow), the post-modernists Marek Budzyński (Church of the Ascension of Christ, Warsaw University Library and the Supreme Court in Warsaw), Romuald Loegler (Centrum E housing estate and Batowice Cemetery Chapel, both in Kraków), and Dariusz Kozłowski (Salesian Society Seminary in Krakow), as well as the neo-modernists like Stefan Kuryłowicz (The Focus and Plac Unii in Warsaw, National Forum of Music in Wrocław), JEMS (Agora headquarters and the Browary Warszawskie mixed-use complex in Warsaw, International Congress Centre in Katowice), Krzysztof Ingarden (Wyspiański Pavilion and ICE Krakow Congress Centre, both in Krakow), and Zbigniew Maćków (Silver Tower Center in Wrocław). In recent years, a significant increase in construction of cultural buildings has also been observed — including Museum of the History of Polish Jews in Warsaw, Taduesz Kantor Museum in Kraków (Ośrodek Dokumentacji Sztuki Tadeusza Kantora Cricoteka), Museum of the Solidarity and Museum of the Second World War in Gdańsk, National Forum of Music in Wrocław, and Szczecin Philharmonic.

Since the creation of the Third Polish Republic, some prominent international architects have completed high-profile projects in Poland, among them Arata Isozaki (Manggha), Norman Foster (Metropolitan and Varso), Daniel Libeskind (Złota 44) and Helmut Jahn (Cosmopolitan Twarda 2/4). There are also other international architects who have contributed to the development of Polish architecture, among them Kohn Pedersen Fox with Warsaw Financial Center, Larry Oltmanns/SOM with Rondo 1, Jürgen Mayer with Hotel Park Inn in Kraków, Rainer Mahlamäki with Museum of the History of Polish Jews, Renato Rizzi with Shakespearian Theatre in Gdańsk, Riegler Riewe Architekten with Silesian Museum, MVRDV with Bałtyk in Poznań and Concordia Design in Wrocław, as well as Estudio Barozzi Veiga with Szczecin Philharmonic, which in 2015 was awarded the European Union Prize for Contemporary Architecture.

== Vernacular architecture ==
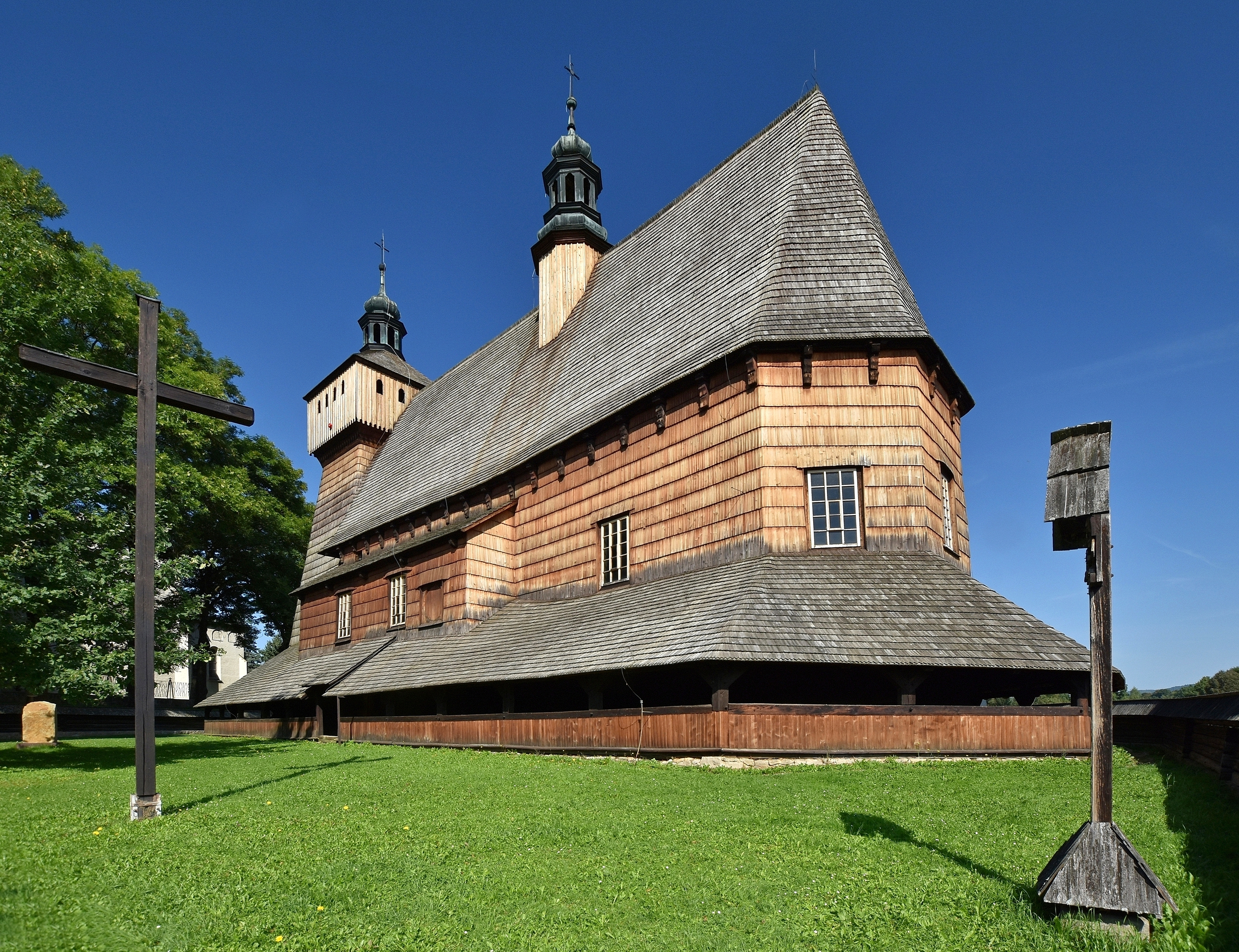
Church of the Assumption of Holy Mary in Haczów, after 1459

Vernacular architecture of Poland includes many wooden Roman Catholic churches and tserkvas (Orthodox and Eastern Catholic churches) in the southeastern Carpathians, some of them dating from the 14th and 15th century (e.g. churches of the Assumption of Holy Mary Church in Haczów, of the St. Michael Archangel in Dębno, of the All Saints in Blizne and of the St. Leonard in Lipnica Murowana). Other examples include wooden synagogues of the Polish–Lithuanian Commonwealth, however most of them were destroyed during the World War II.

== Architecture schools in Poland ==
University	Department	Location
Politechnika Gdańska	Wydział Architektury	Gdańsk
Politechnika Poznańska	Wydział Architektury	Poznań
Politechnika Wrocławska	Wydział Architektury	Wrocław
Politechnika Warszawska	Wydział Architektury	Warsaw
Politechnika Śląska	Wydział Architektury Politechniki Śląskiej	Gliwice
Politechnika Rzeszowska	Wydział Budownictwa, Inżynierii Środowiska i Architektury	Rzeszów
Politechnika Krakowska	Wydział Architektury	Kraków
Politechnika Lubelska	Wydział Budownictwa i Architektury	Lublin
Politechnika Łódzka	Instytut Architektury i Urbanistyki Wydziału Budownictwa, Architektury i Inżynierii Środowiska PŁ	Łódź
Politechnika Białostocka	Wydział Architektury	Białystok
Uniwersytet Artystyczny w Poznaniu	Wydział Architektury i Wzornictwa	Poznań
Uniwersytet Technologiczno-Przyrodniczy w Bydgoszczy	Wydział Budownictwa, Architektury i Inżynierii Środowiska	Bydgoszcz
Zachodniopomorski Uniwersytet Technologiczny w Szczecinie	Wydział Budownictwa i Architektury	Szczecin
Politechnika Świętokrzyska	Wydział Budownictwa i Architektury	Kielce
Państwowa Wyższa Szkoła Zawodowa	Instytut Architektury	Racibórz
Państwowa Wyższa Szkoła Zawodowa	Wydział Nauk Technicznych	Nysa
Państwowa Wyższa Szkoła Zawodowa	Instytut Nauk Technicznych	Nowy Targ

== Literature and sources ==
- Tadeusz Dobrowolski, Sztuka polska, Warszawa 1970.
- Tadeusz Dobrowolski, Władysław Tatarkiewicz (ed.), Historia sztuki polskiej vol. I-III, Kraków 1965.
- Marek Walczak, Piotr Krasny, Stefania Kszysztofowicz-Kozakowska, Sztuka Polski, Kraków 2006.
- Adam Miłobędzki, Zarys dziejów architektury w Polsce, Warszawa 1978.
- Zygmunt Świechowski, Sztuka polska. Romanizm, Warszawa 2005.
- Szczęsny Skibiński, Katarzyna Zalewska-Lorkiewicz, Sztuka polska. Gotyk, Warszawa 2010.
- Mieczysław Zlat, Sztuka polska. Renesans i manieryzm, Warszawa 2008.
- Zbigniew Bania [et al.], Sztuka polska. Wczesny i dojrzały barok (XVII wiek), Warszawa 2013.
- Zbigniew Bania [et al.], Sztuka polska. Późny barok, rokoko, klasycyzm (XVIII wiek), Warszawa 2016.
- Jerzy Malinowski [ed.], Sztuka polska. Sztuka XIX wieku (z uzupełnieniem o sztukę Śląska i Pomorza Zachodniego), Warszawa 2016.
- Stefania Krzysztofowicz-Kozakowska, Sztuka II RP, Olszanica 2013.
- Stefania Krzysztofowicz-Kozakowska, Sztuka w czasach PRL, Olszanica 2016.
- Stefania Krzysztofowicz-Kozakowska, Sztuka od roku 1989, Olszanica 2020.
- Anna Cymer, Architektura w Polsce 1945–1989, Warszawa 2019.

== See also ==
- List of Polish architects
- Architecture of Warsaw
- Residential architecture in Poland
- List of tallest buildings in Poland
- Wooden synagogues of the former Polish–Lithuanian Commonwealth
- Vernacular architecture of the Carpathians
- Silesian architecture
- Association of Polish Architects
