= Focus (Warsaw) =

Office building in Warsaw, Poland

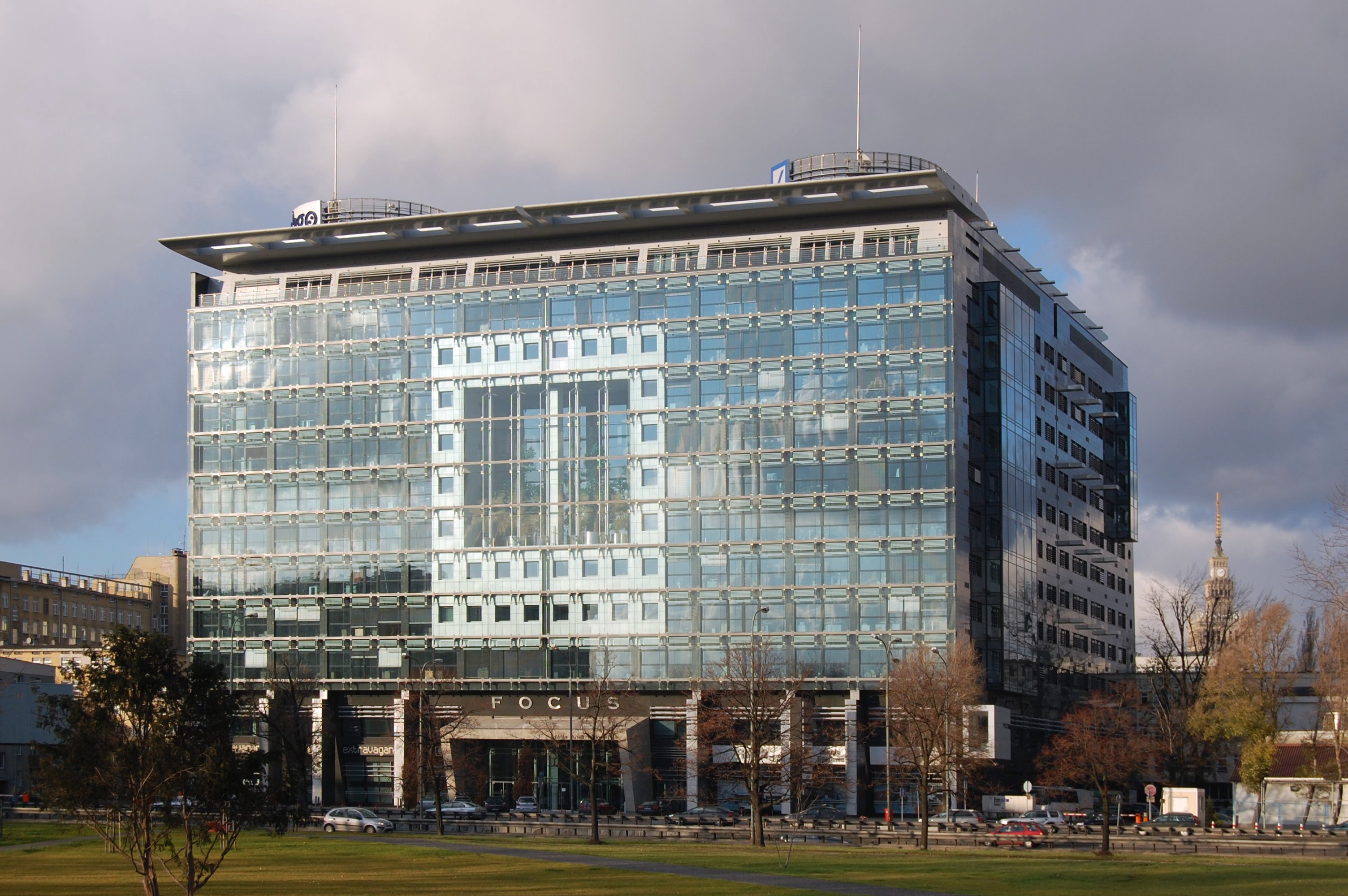
- The Focus in 2007.

General information
- Type: Office building
- Location: Warsaw, Poland, 26 People's Army Avenue
- Coordinates: 52°13′04″N 21°00′29″E
- Construction started: 1998
- Completed: 2001

Height
- Tip: 49.4 m

Technical details
- Floor count: 12
- Floor area: 54,289 m²

Design and construction
- Architect: Stefan Kuryłowicz

The Focus, also known as Focus Filtrowa, is an office building in Warsaw, Poland, located in the district of Downtown, at 26 People's Army Avenue. It was opened in 2001.

== History ==
The building was designed by architect Stefan Kuryłowicz, and built between 1998 and 2001.

== Characteristics ==
The Focus is an office building, located at 26 People's Army Avenue. The building has a shape of a rectangular cuboid with the base of 67 m × 65.2 m, and a height of 49.4 m. It has 12 storeys and a total height of 49.9 m, and the total floor area of 54,289 m^{2}. Additionally it has 3 underground storeys containing car parks.

Each wall of the building was designed in a different architectural style, and inside, the building has 4 different self-sufficient sections.

The front wall includes a 4-storey-tall indoor garden, with a view on the Mokotów Field. The front wall is covered in two layers of a curtain wall, which provides thermal and sound isolation.

In the building also includes an atrium, which with its asymmetrical composition, contrasts with the building's front façade. It is covered in a glass roof, and connected with an indoor garden.

Since 2016, on the building's roof is placed an apiary.

The building houses the embassies of Iceland, and Norway, and the headquarters of Deutsche Bank Polska.
