= Brzeg Town Hall =

Coordinates: 50.8617°N 17.4694°E

Ratusz Brzeski (Brzeg Town Hall)
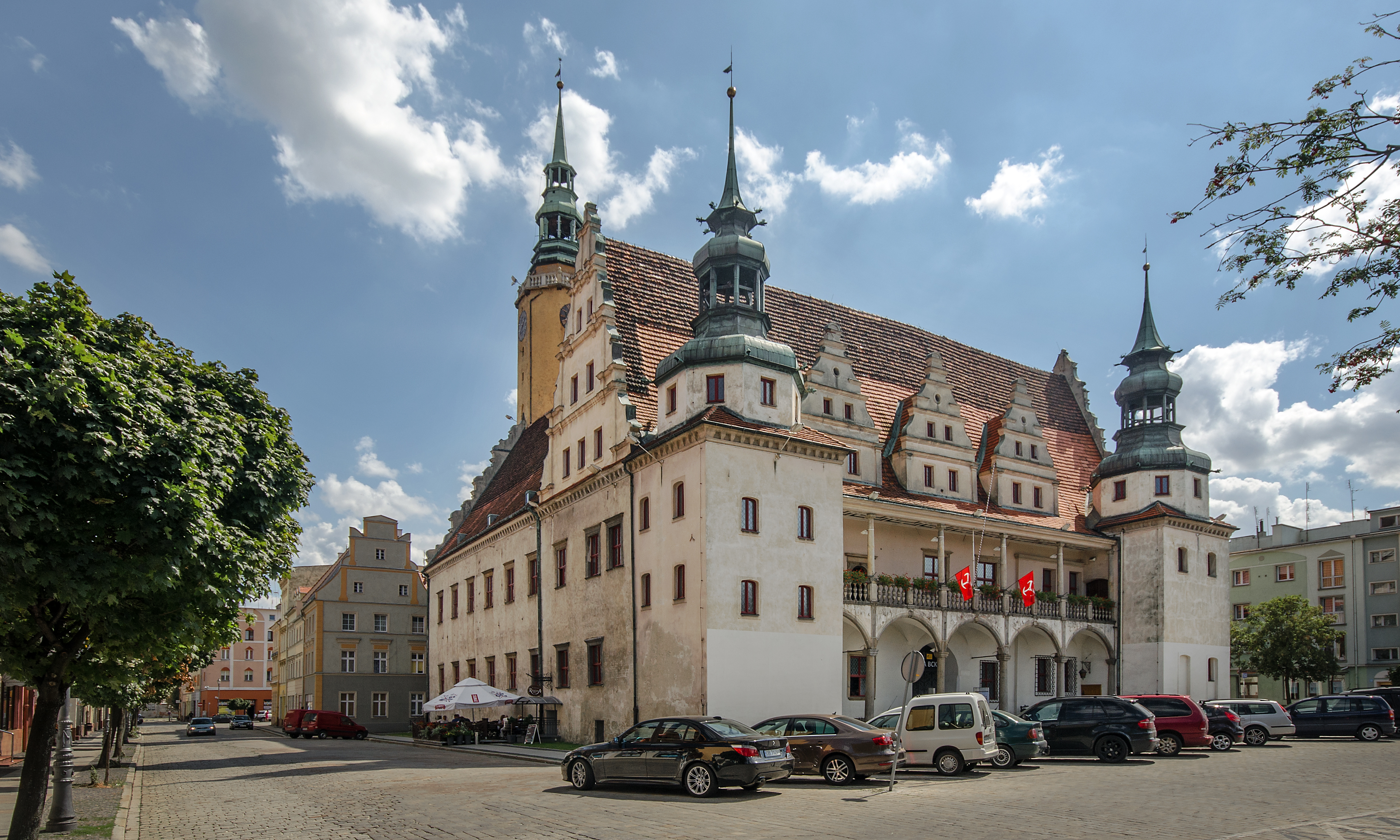
- Brzeg Town Hall
- Interactive map of the Ratusz Brzeski (Brzeg Town Hall) area

General information
- Type: Town hall, museum
- Architectural style: Renaissance
- Location: Brzeg, Poland
- Current tenants: Brzeg City Council
- Construction started: 1569
- Completed: 1577
- Owner: Brzeg City

Design and construction
- Architect: Bernard Niuron

Brzeg Town Hall is a Renaissance building designed by Bernard Niuron built between 1569 and 1577. It is considered to be one of the most important Renaissance monuments in Poland. In addition to its role as the seat of the municipal government of Brzeg, the building houses several other institutions.

== History ==
The first building housing the municipal government in Brzeg already existed in the fourteenth century but was burned down in the town's great fire during the reign of George II of Brieg. The present town hall was built between 1569 and 1577. It was designed by the Italian architect Bernardo Niuron, assisted by the Italian builder Giacomo Parr, who have been also involved in the construction of the Brzeg Castle. In later years, the building underwent minor alterations in some of its rooms, which were adapted for administrative purposes. In 1926, a Renaissance gate, from one of the Brzeg townhouses, was added to the southern façade. The Voivodeship Conservation Orders of 25 November 1949 and 10 January 1964 listed the town hall as a heritage monument.

== Architecture ==
The town hall is a Renaissance structure built in the town square, surrounded by an inner courtyard of townhouses. It has two storeys and a saddle roof. The most interesting part of the building is its western side. In the corner there are two quadrangular towers with tented roofs and roof lanterns. Between them spans a five-axis loggia, with semicircular arches on the ground floor. Over the loggia there is another level with windows, which are separated from the mansard roof by a cornice. Fragments of the façade are covered with sgraffito decorations from the seventeenth-century. There is a four-sided central tower with an octagonal cupola topped with a balustrade and two roof lanterns. The interiors have been preserved with halls and corridors of the original design, most notably the Hall of Councillors with its wall paintings and fine ceiling. The Stropowa Hall has a larch ceiling from 1646. Currently, the town hall functions as the seat of the city and several other institutions.

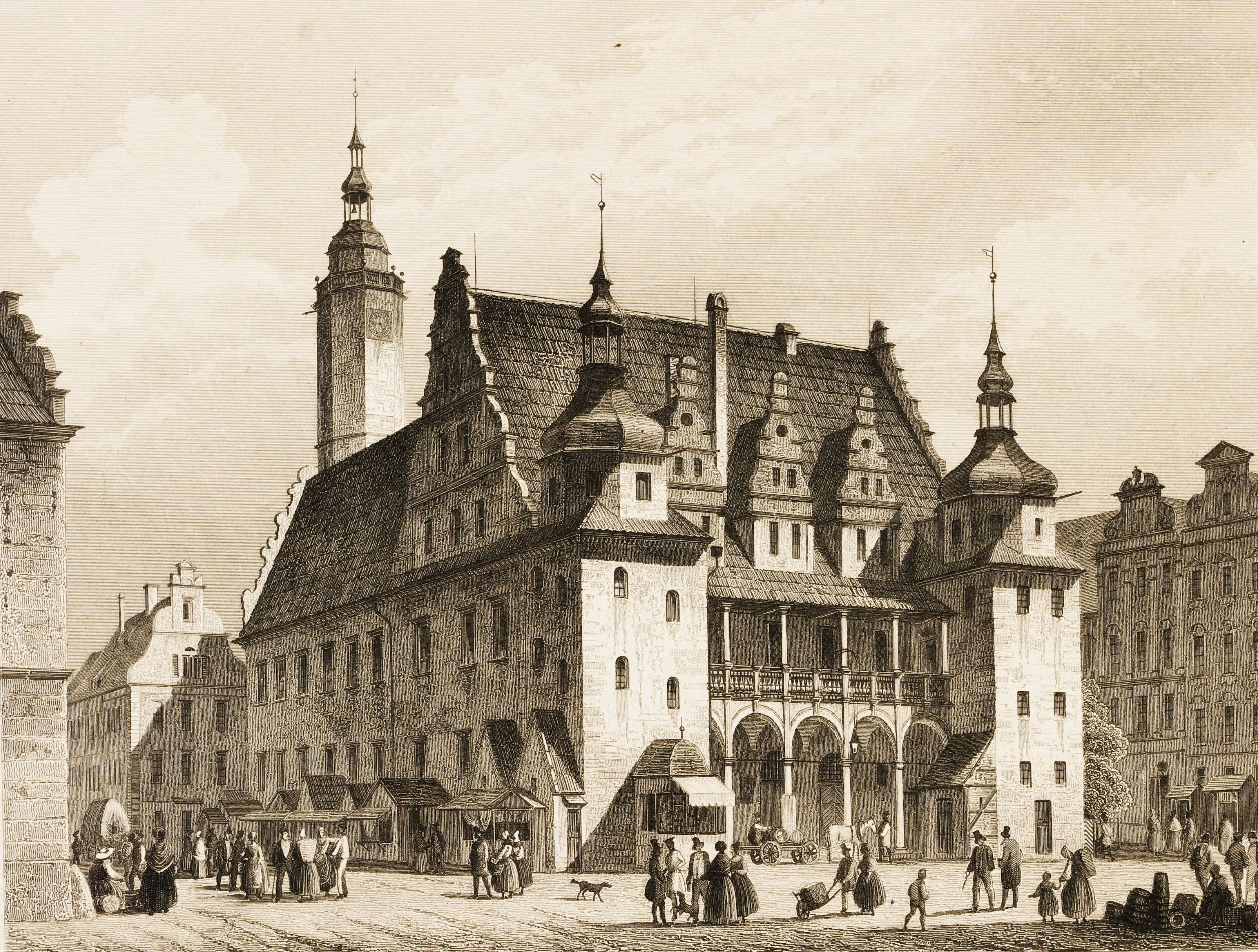
Town hall in 1852

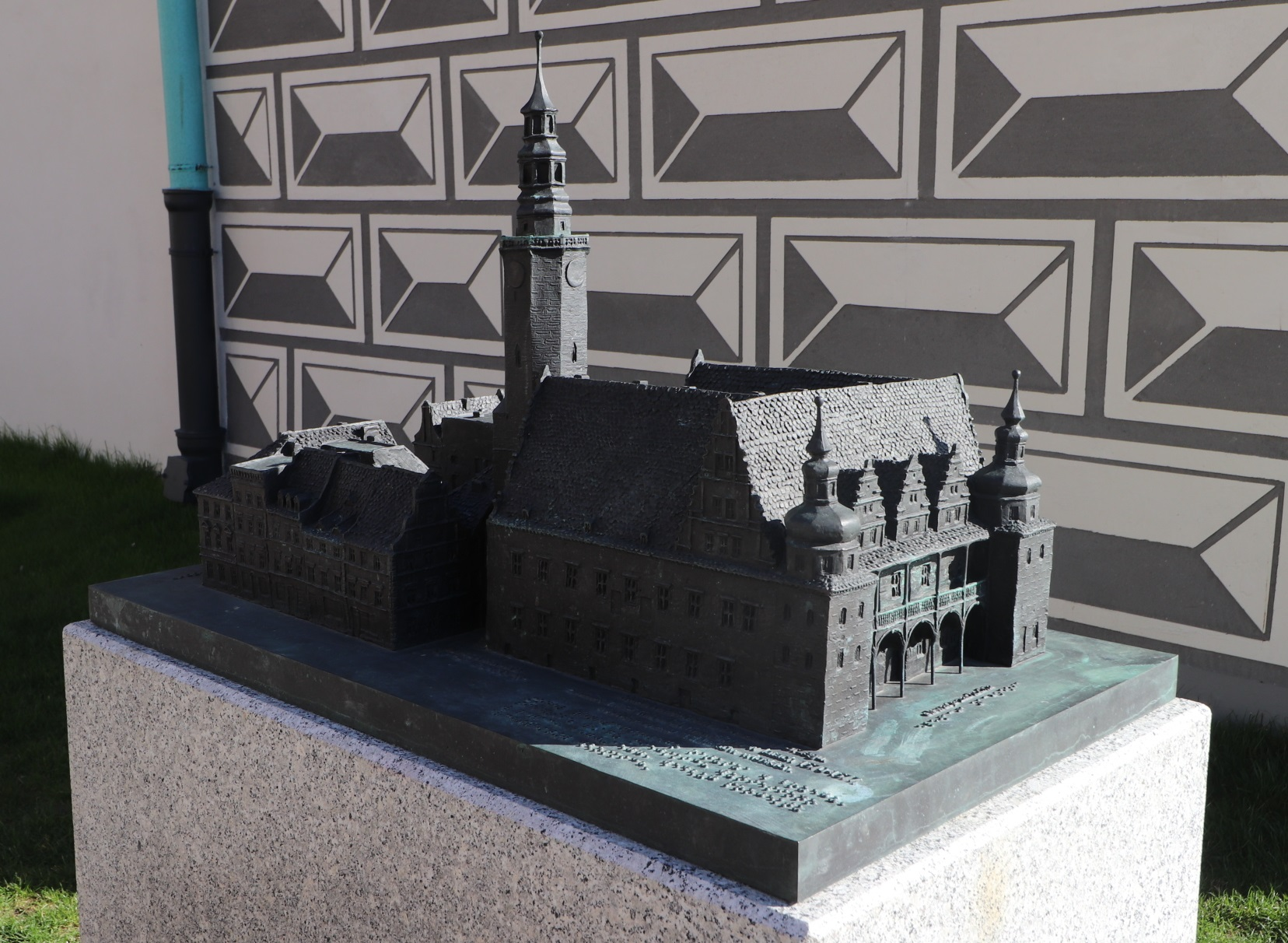
Brzeg town hall model

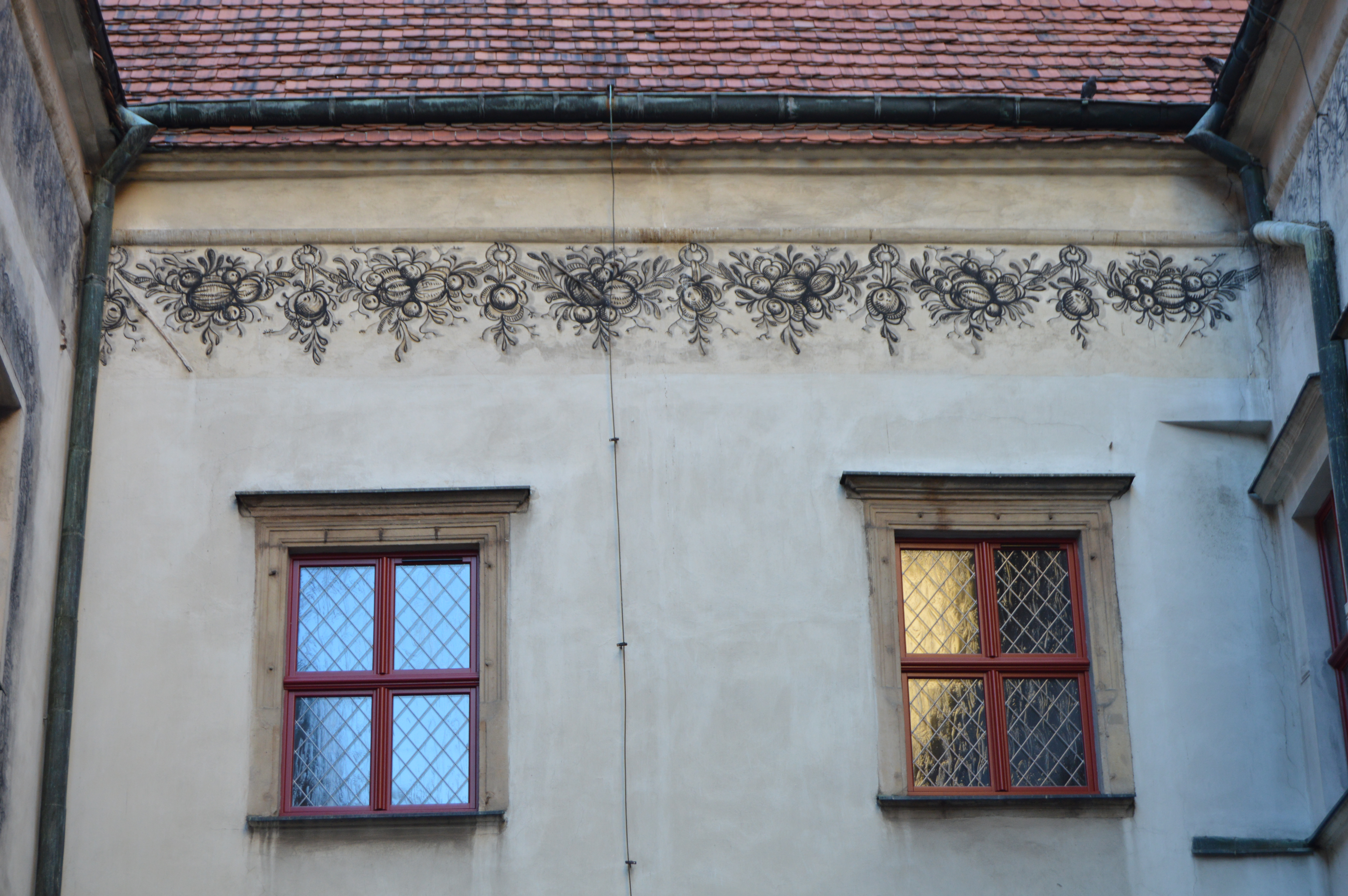
Sgraffiti in the inner courtyard
