= Jan Koszczyc Witkiewicz =

Polish architect and conservator

Jan Witkiewicz Koszczyc (16 March 1881 – 26 October 1958) was a Polish architect and conservator.

He was born in Rudamina (Urdomin) and died in Warsaw.
