= Frog House =

Art Nouveau house in Bielsko-Biała, Poland

Coordinates: 49°49′25.8″N 19°3′5.4″E

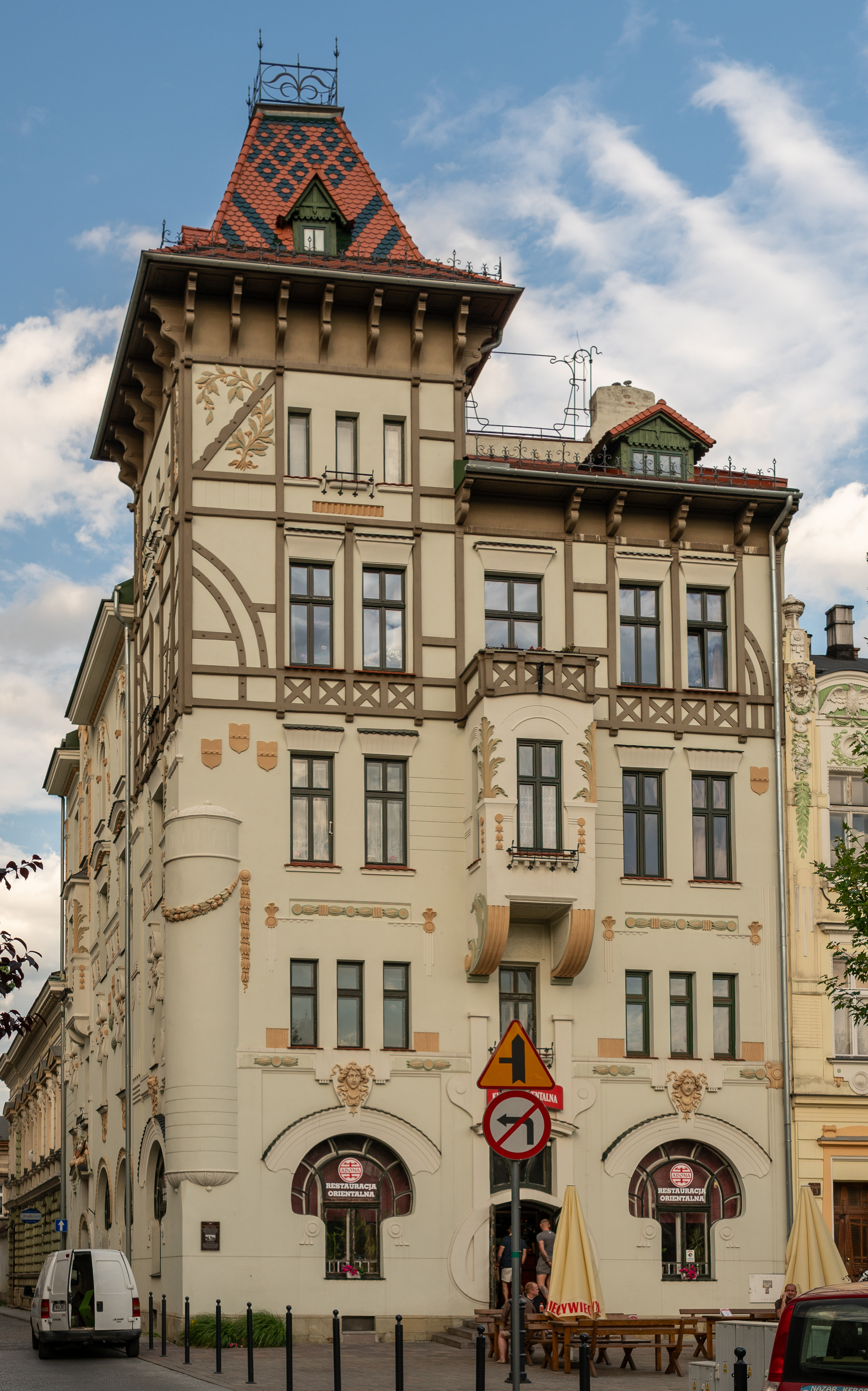
The Frog House

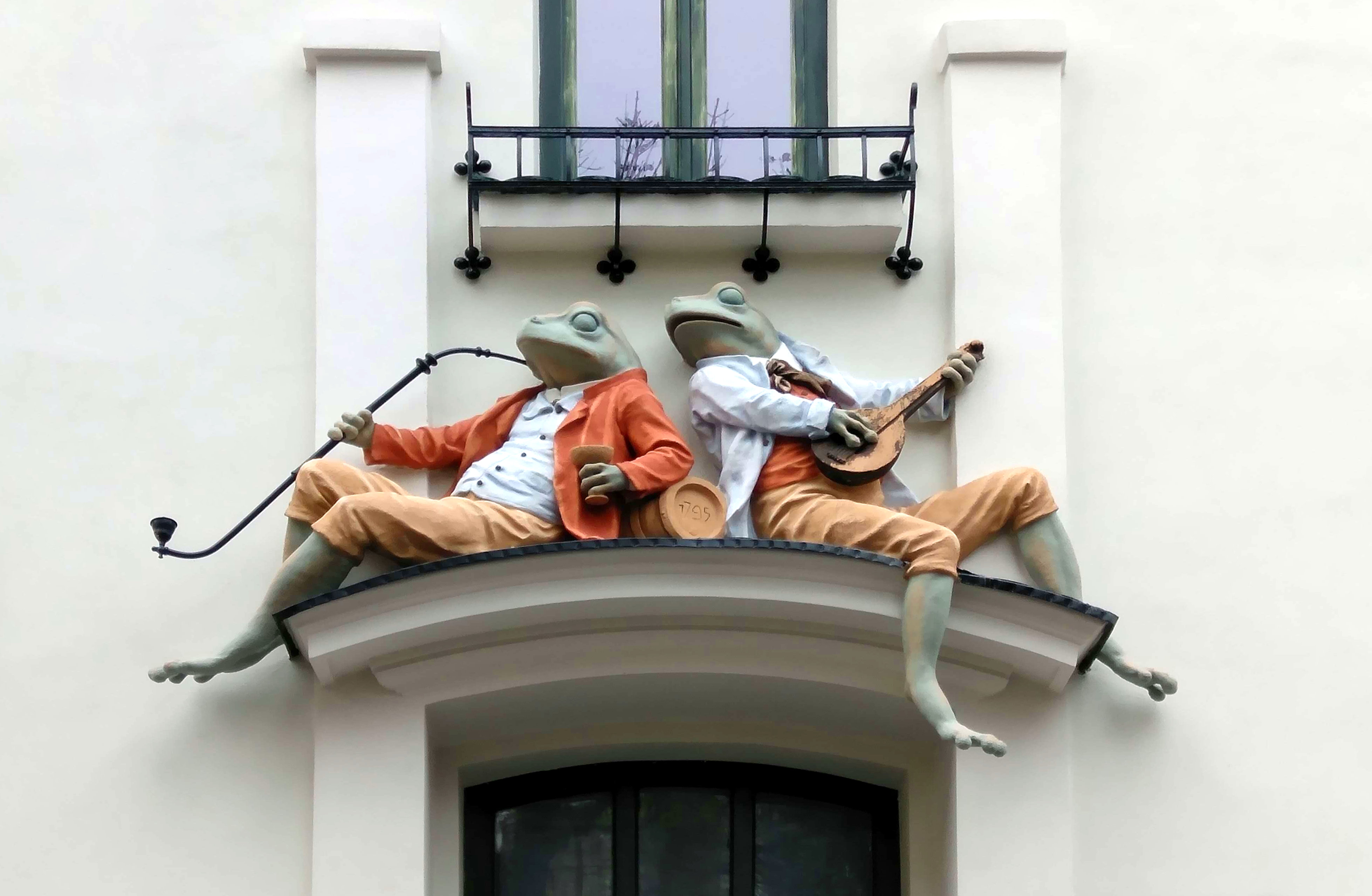
Frogs

Frog House (Polish: kamienica Pod Żabami) is an example of Art Nouveau architecture in the city of Bielsko-Biała, in southern Poland's Silesia Province. It features two frogs seated over the entrance, one smoking a pipe and the other playing a mandolin, while beetles roam freely over the walls.

The Frog House stands on Bielsko-Biała's Polish Army Square (plac Wojska Polskiego).

The building was renovated in 2020.
