= Stonegate =

Stonegate or Stone Gate(s) may refer to:

== Businesses ==
- Stonegate Bank, United States
- Stonegate Pub Company, United Kingdom

== Film ==
- The Stone Gate, a 1992 romance in Croatian

== Places ==
=== England ===
- Stonegate (York), a historic street
- Stonegate, East Sussex
  - Stonegate railway station
- Stonegate, Scarborough, a location in North Yorkshire

=== United States ===
- Stonegate, Colorado
- Stonegate, Fort Worth, Texas
- StoneGate Christian Academy, Irving, Texas
- Stonegate Village, California, in El Dorado County
- Stonegate, a neighborhood of Davis, California
- Stonegate, a neighborhood of Irvine, California
- Two Stone Gates, landmarks in Los Angeles, California

=== Elsewhere ===
- Stone Gate, a landmark in Zagreb, Croatia
- Stonegate-Queensway, a neighbourhood of Toronto, Canada

== See also ==
- Stanegate, a disused road in northern England
- Stonegate Elementary School (disambiguation), various American schools
- Stonegate Mansion, Fortworth, Texas, US
- Stoneygate, a suburb of Manchester, England
