= City gate =

Gate set within a city wall

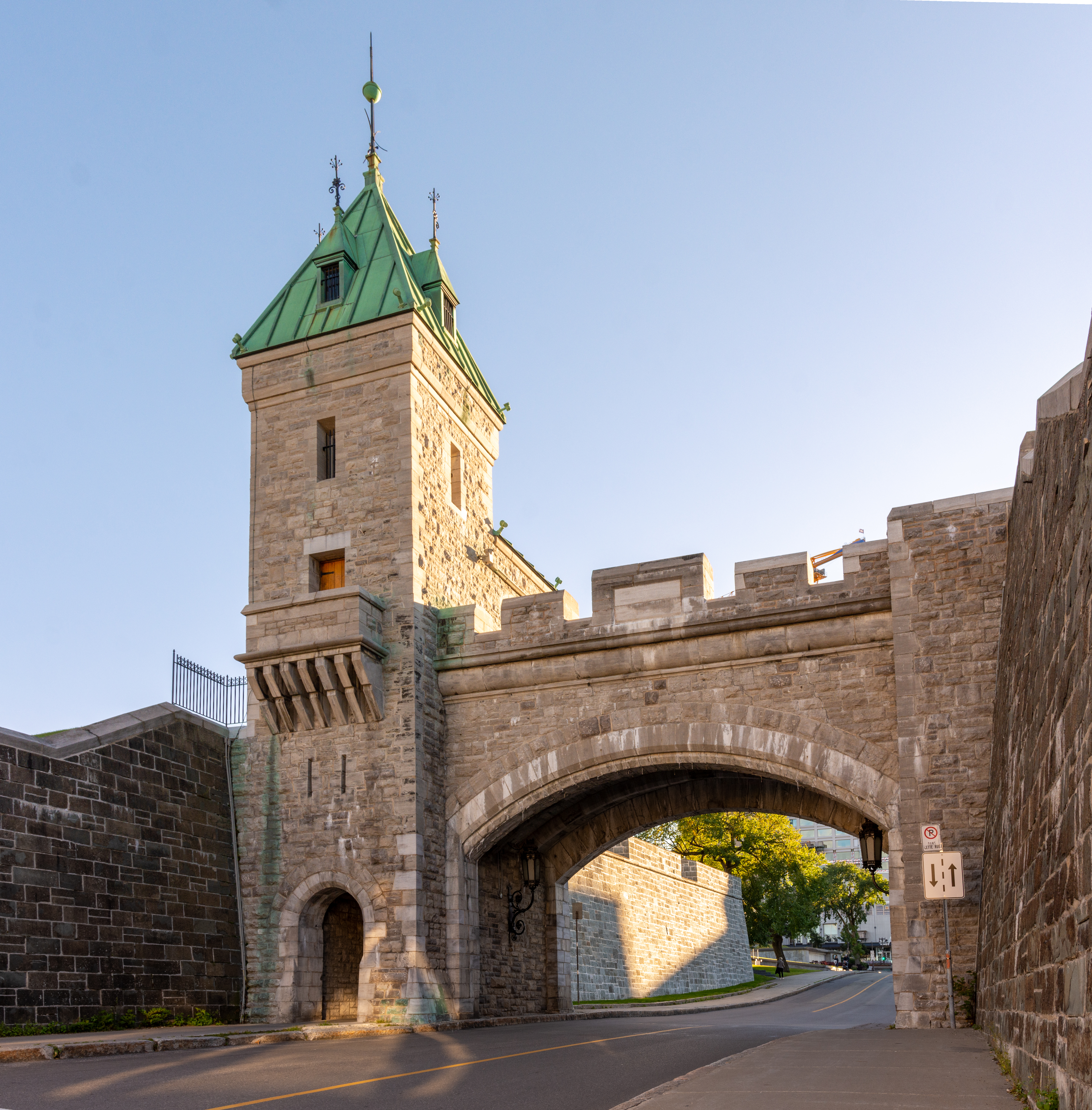
Kent Gate is a city gate at the ramparts of Quebec.

A city gate is a gate which is, or was, set within a city wall. It is a type of fortified gateway.

== Uses ==
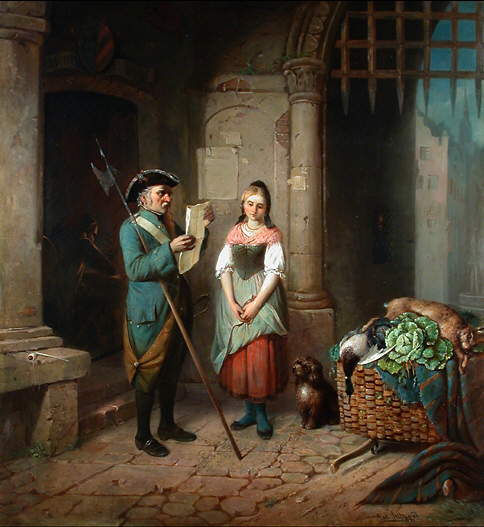
Depiction of a guard checking a salesperson's papers at a city gate

City gates were traditionally built to provide a point of controlled access to and departure from a walled city for people, vehicles, goods and animals. Depending on their historical context they filled functions relating to defense, security, health, trade, taxation, and representation, and were correspondingly staffed by military or municipal authorities. The city gate was also commonly used to display diverse kinds of public information such as announcements, tax and toll schedules, standards of local measures, and legal texts. It could be heavily fortified, ornamented with heraldic shields, sculpture or inscriptions, or used as a location for warning or intimidation, for example by displaying the heads of beheaded criminals or public enemies.

Notably in Denmark, many market towns used to have at least one city gate mostly as part of the city's fortifications, but during the Age of Absolutism their functions become closely linked to the collection of customs, the so-called octroi, which from 1660 onwards was charged to the market town's coffers. When absolutism in Denmark came to an end after the revolutions of 1848, gate consumption was abolished in 1852, and since then the city gates also began to disappear. Medieval Danish city gates are found today only in Vesterport, Faaborg, and Mølleporten, Stege, as well as in Flensburg, today in Germany.

Further city gates, in one form or another, can be found across the world in cities dating back to ancient times to around the 19th century. Many cities would close their gates after a curfew each night.

With increased stability and freedom, many walled cities removed such fortifications as city gates, although many still survive; albeit for historic interest rather than security. Many surviving gates have been heavily restored, rebuilt or new ones created to add to the appearance of a city, such as Bab Bou Jalous in Fes. With increased levels of traffic, city gates have come under threat in the past for impeding the flow of traffic, such as Temple Bar Gate in London which was removed in the 19th century.

== Examples ==
=== Africa ===
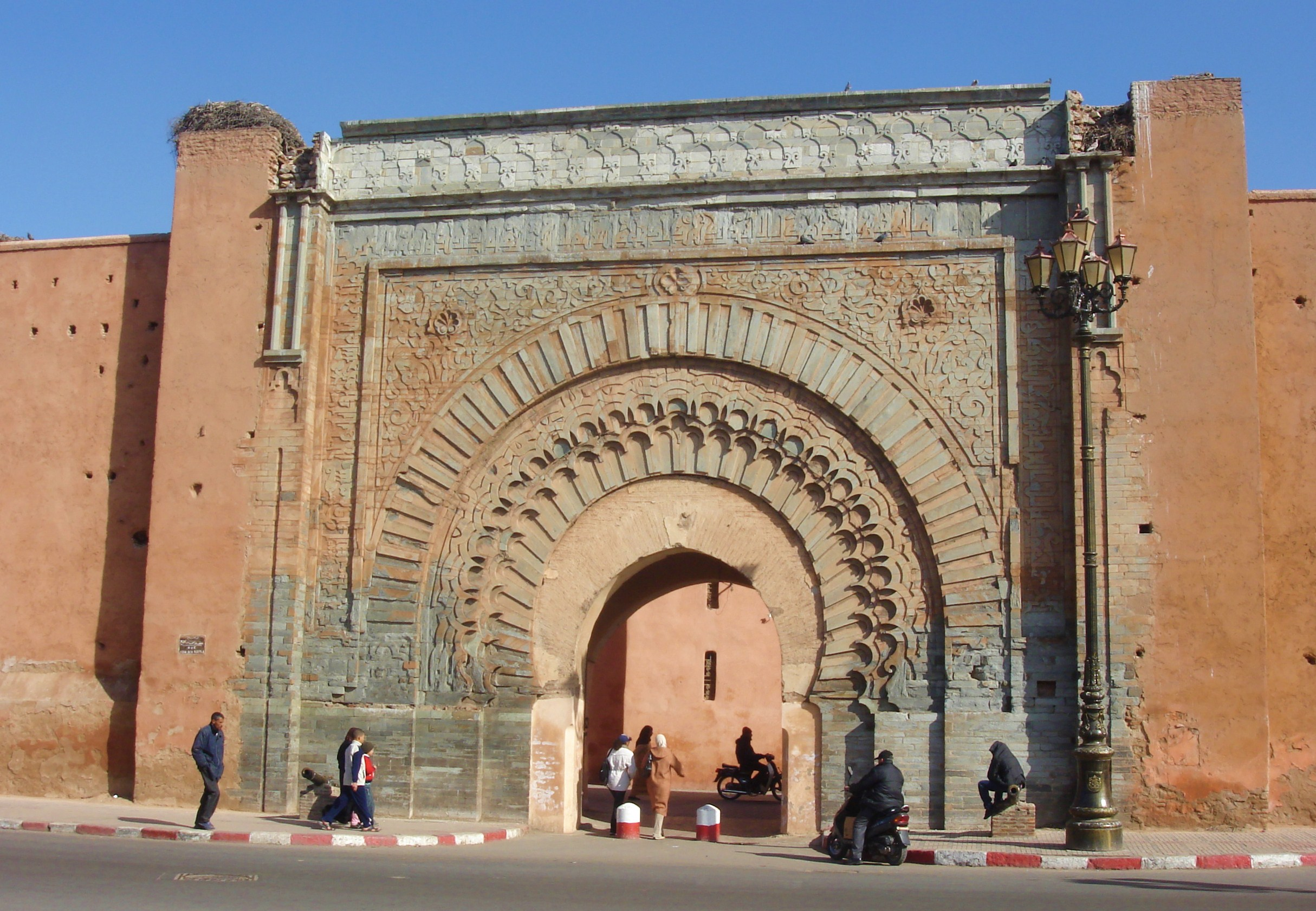
Bab Agnaou is a city gate in Marrakesh.

- Egypt: Gates of Cairo
- Morocco:
  - Bab Agnaou in Marrakesh
  - Gates of Fez

=== Asia ===
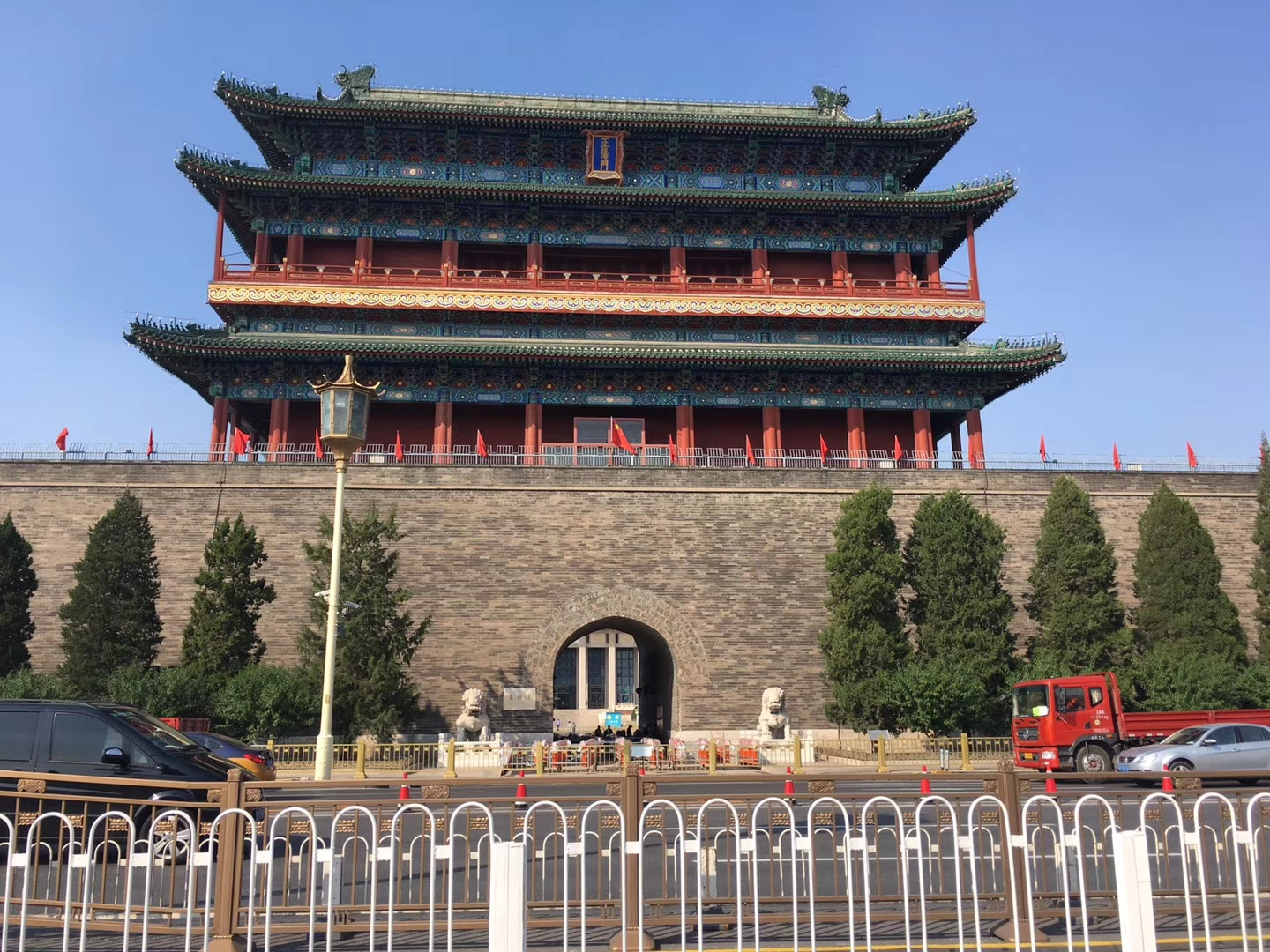
Zhengyangmen is a city gate in Beijing.

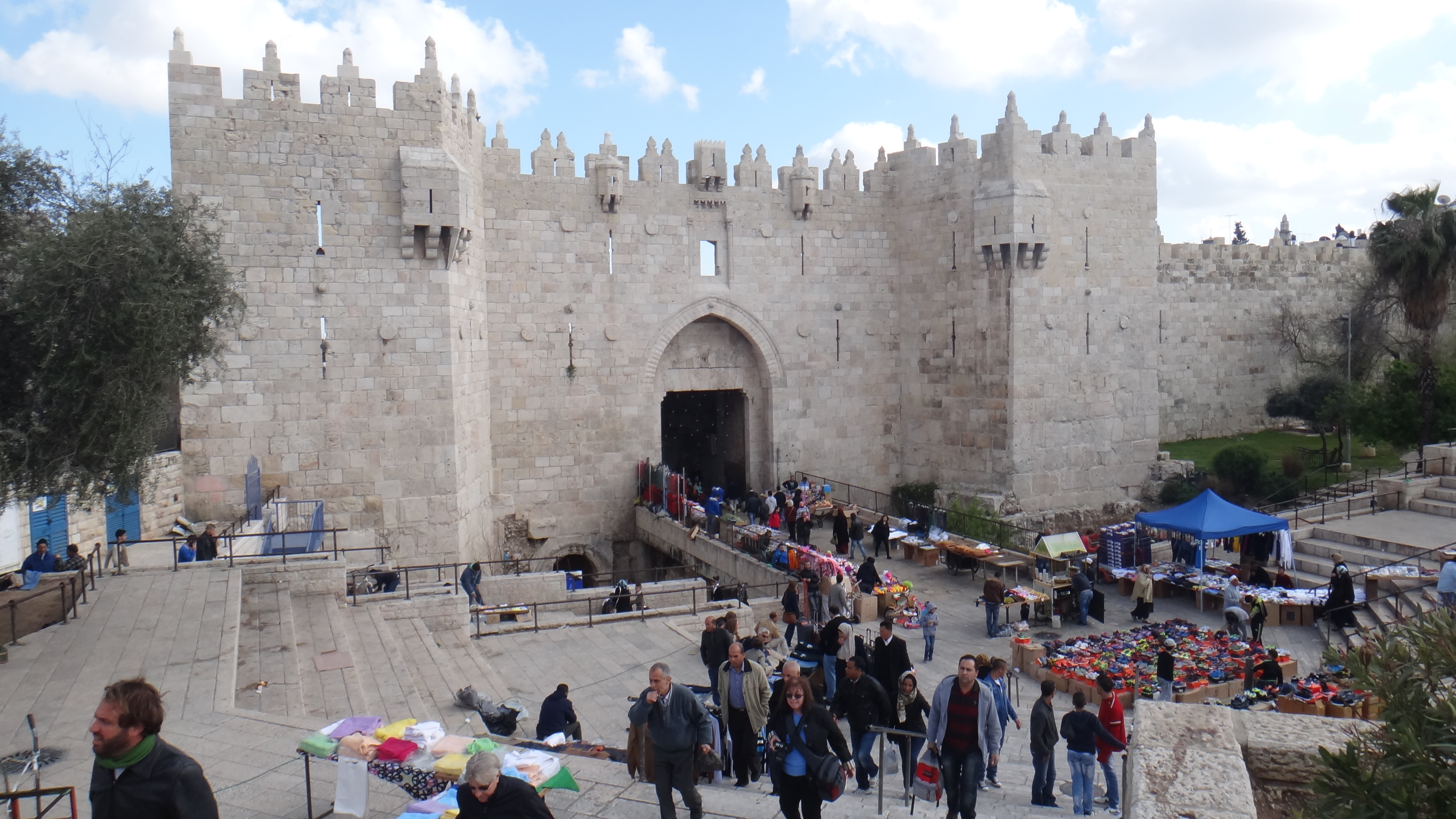
Damascus Gate is one of several gates of the Old City of Jerusalem.

- Bangladesh
  - Dhaka Gate in Dhaka
  - City Gate, Chittagong
- China
  - Zhengyangmen and Deshengmen in Beijing
  - Gate of China in Nanjing
  - city gate of Jianshui
- Cyprus: Famagusta Gate in Nicosia
- India
  - Gateway of India in Mumbai (Maharashtra)
  - Walled city of Jaipur in Jaipur (Rajasthan)
  - Walled city and gates of Aurangabad in Aurangabad (Maharashtra)
  - Walled city of Kota in Kota (Rajasthan)
  - Teen Darwaza in Bhadra Fort, Ahmedabad
- Iraq: Ishtar Gate, Hillah
- Iran
  - Qur'an gate (Shiraz)
  - Nowbar gate (Tabriz).
- Israel: Gates in Jerusalem's Old City Walls
- Japan: Rashomon Gate, Kyoto
- Macau: Portas do Cerco - border gate for Macau with neighbouring Zhuhai
- Pakistan: Walled City of Lahore
- Philippines: Gates of Intramuros
- South Korea: Seoul's city gates, including: Namdaemun and Dongdaemun
- Taiwan: North gate of Taipei
- Yemen: Bab al Yemen of Sanaa

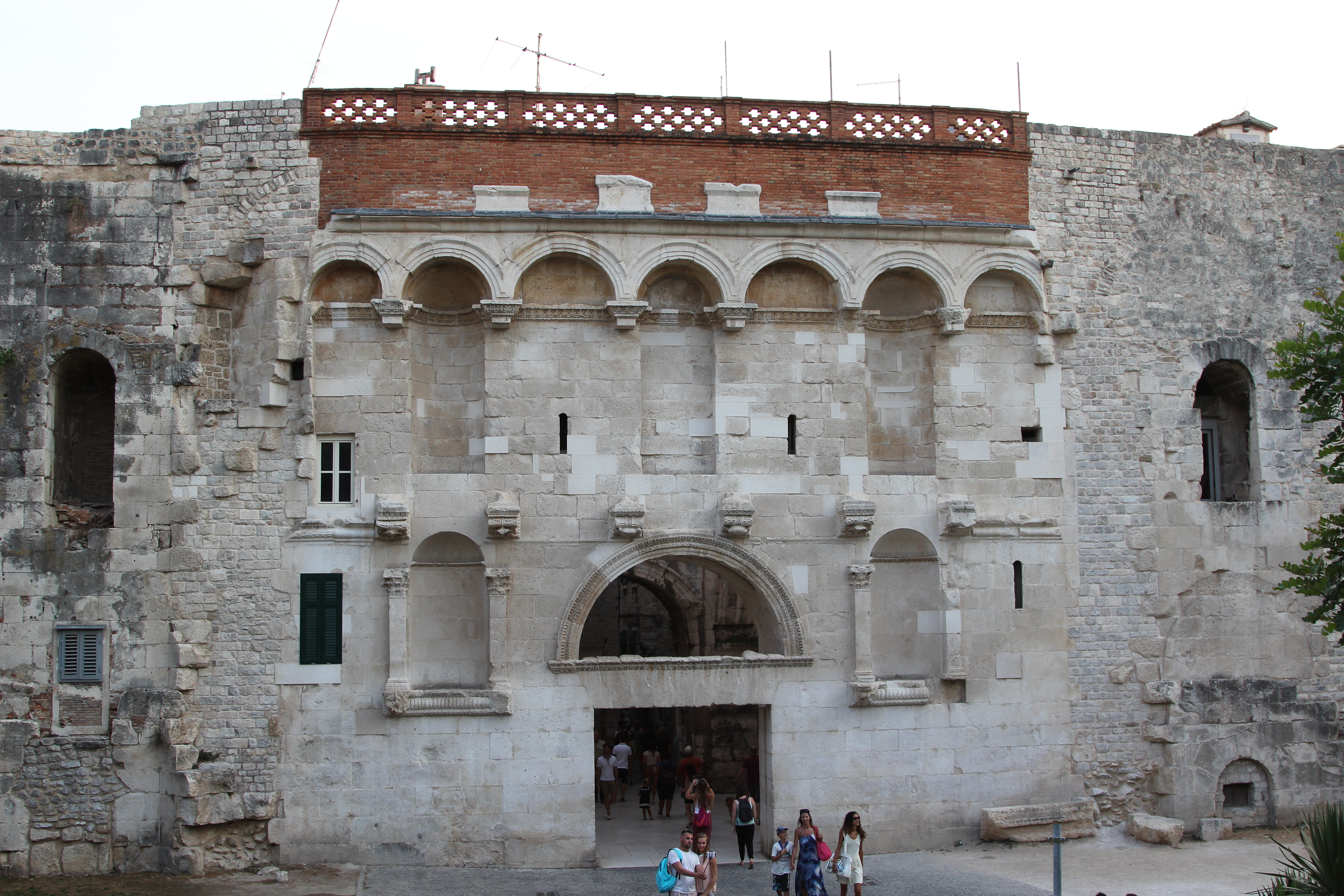
Golden Gate of Diocletian's Palace in Split

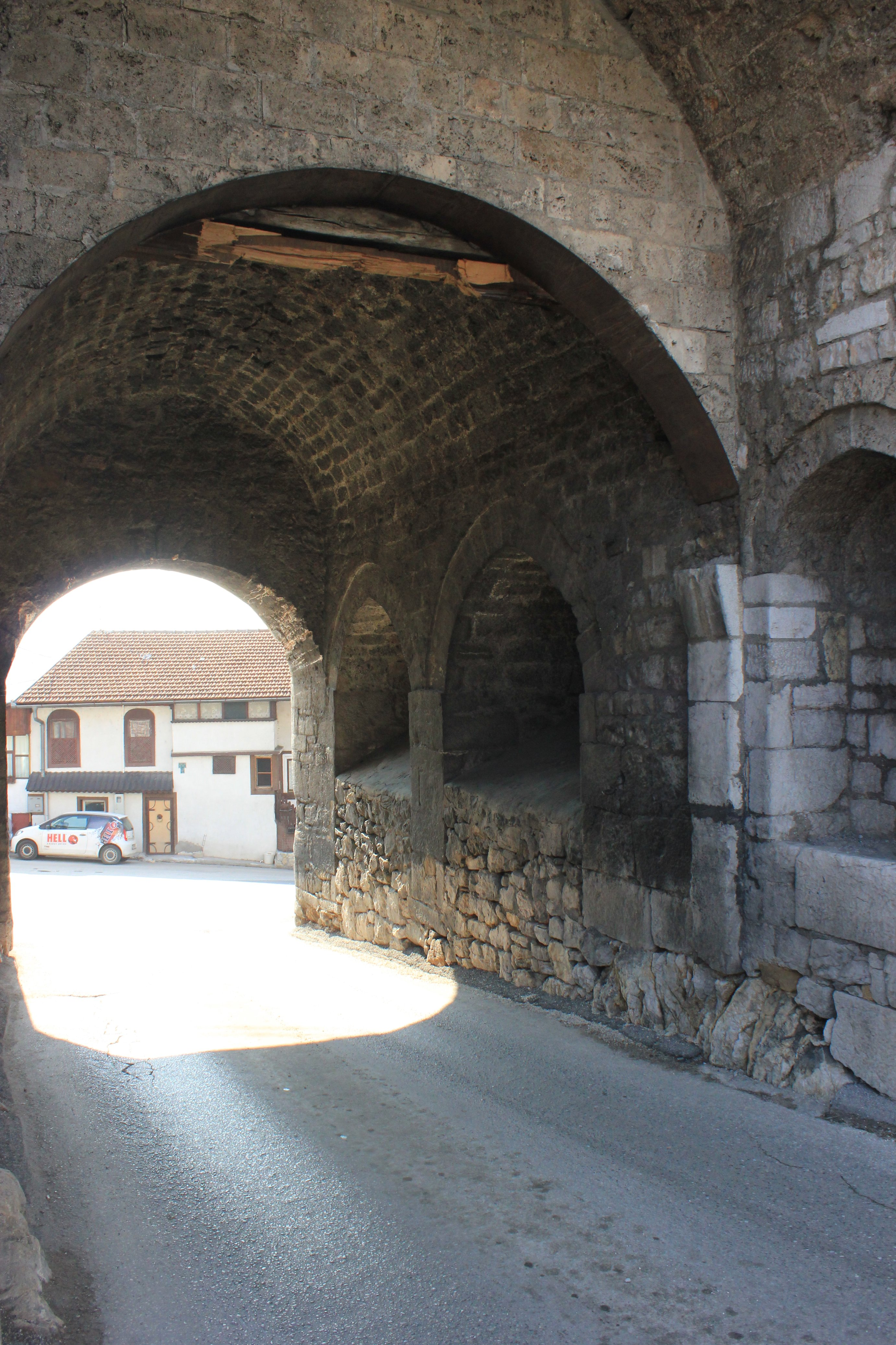
Višegrad Gate on Vratnik, eastern entrance to Sarajevo

=== Europe ===
- Austria: Wienertor (1225/65): in Hainburg an der Donau
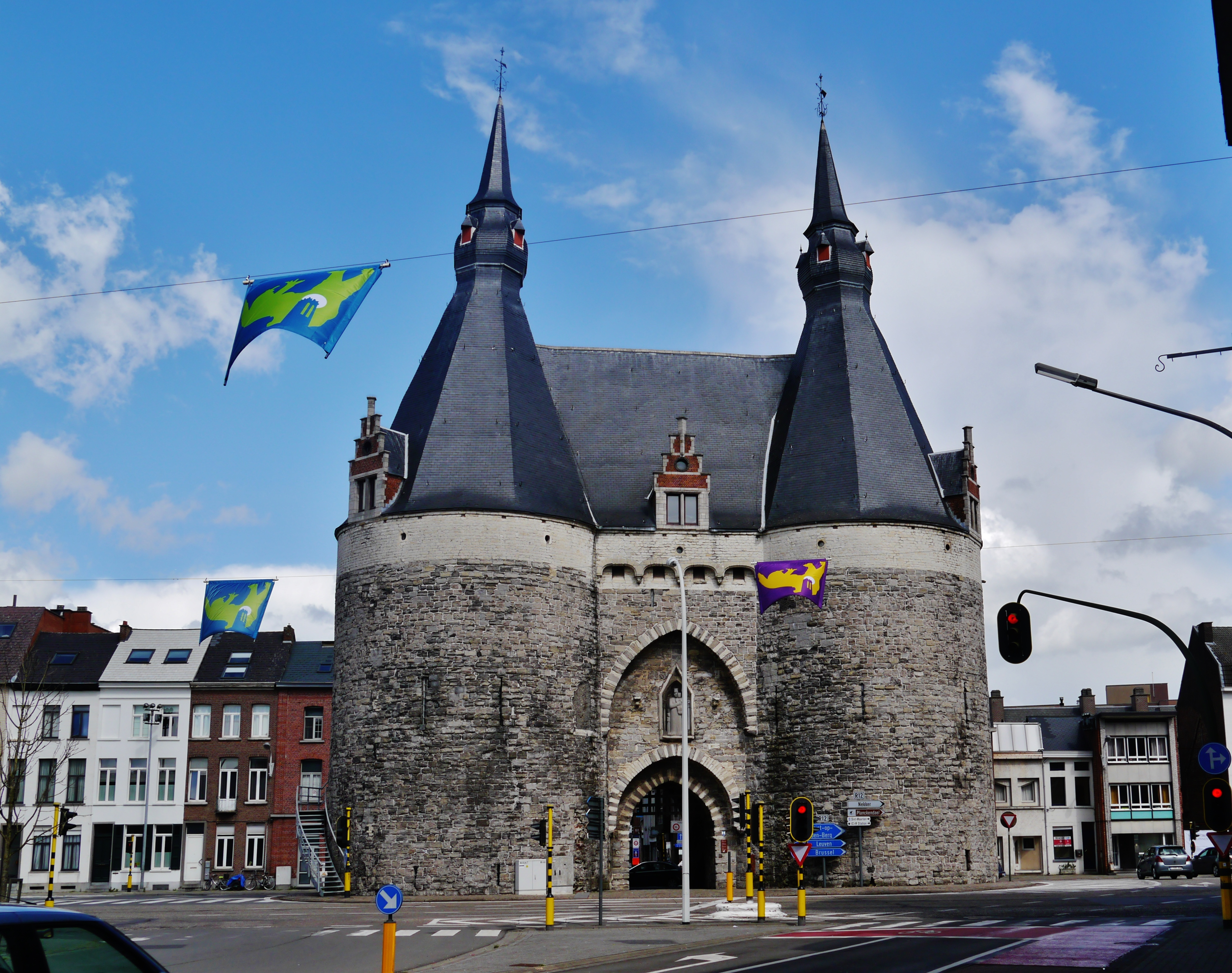
- Brusselpoort is a city gate in Mechelen.
  Belgium:
  - Brusselpoort: in Mechelen
  - Waterpoort in Antwerp
  - Halle Gate in Brussels
- Bosnia and Herzegovina: two Jajce gates, three gates of the old town of Vratnik in Sarajevo
- Croatia: gates in Walls of Dubrovnik, gates of Diocletian's Palace in Split, gate of Old town of Korčula
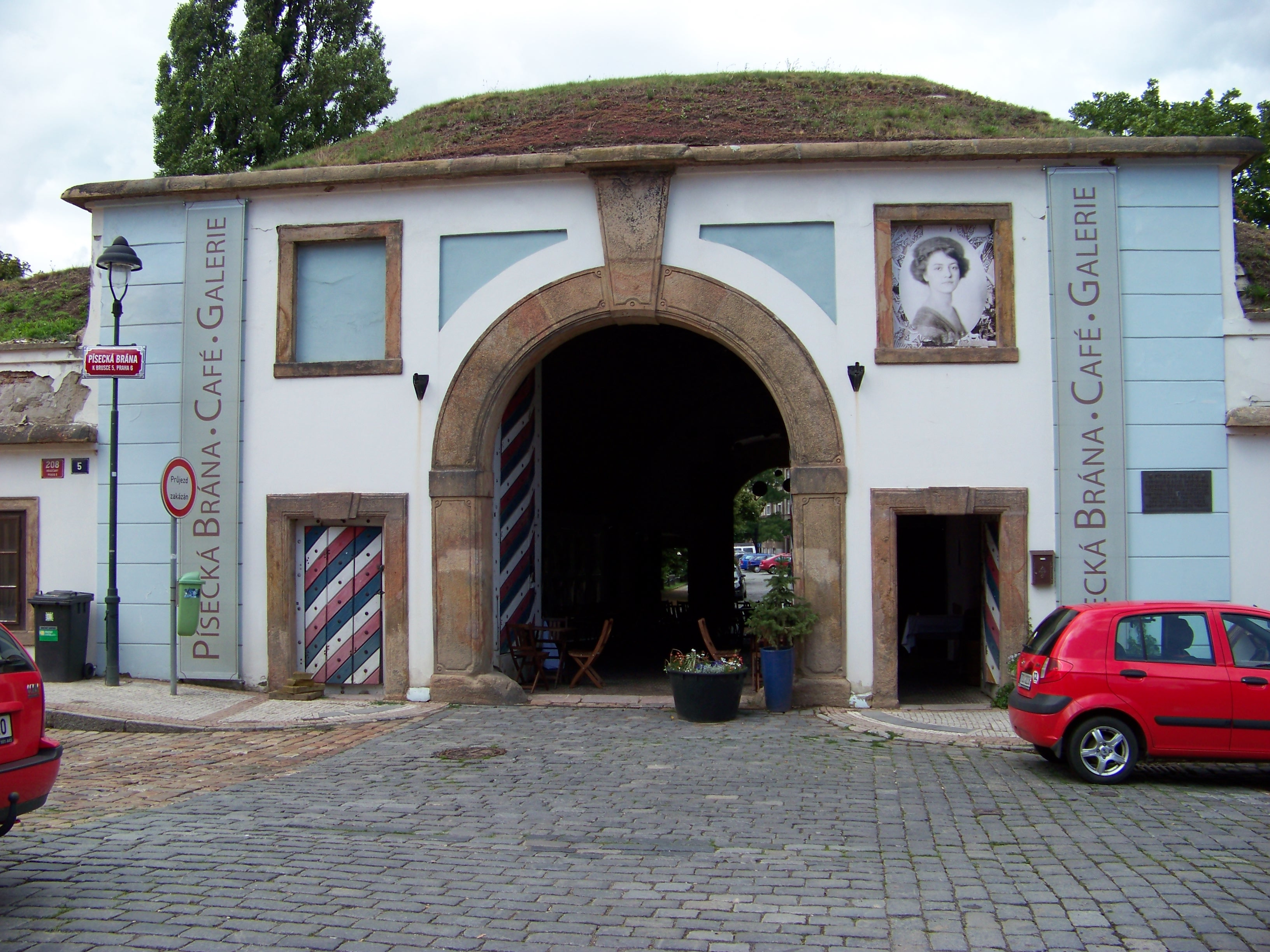
- Písek Gate is a city gate in Prague.
  Czech Republic:
  - Powder Gate, Prague
  - Písek Gate, Prague
  - Zelená brána (Green Gate), Pardubice
  - Brána Matky Boží, Jihlava
  - Svatá brána, Kadaň
  - Vysoká brána, Rakovník
  - Pražská brána, Rakovník
- Denmark: Vesterport, Faaborg
  - Mølleporten, Stege
- Estonia: Tallinn Gate in Pärnu
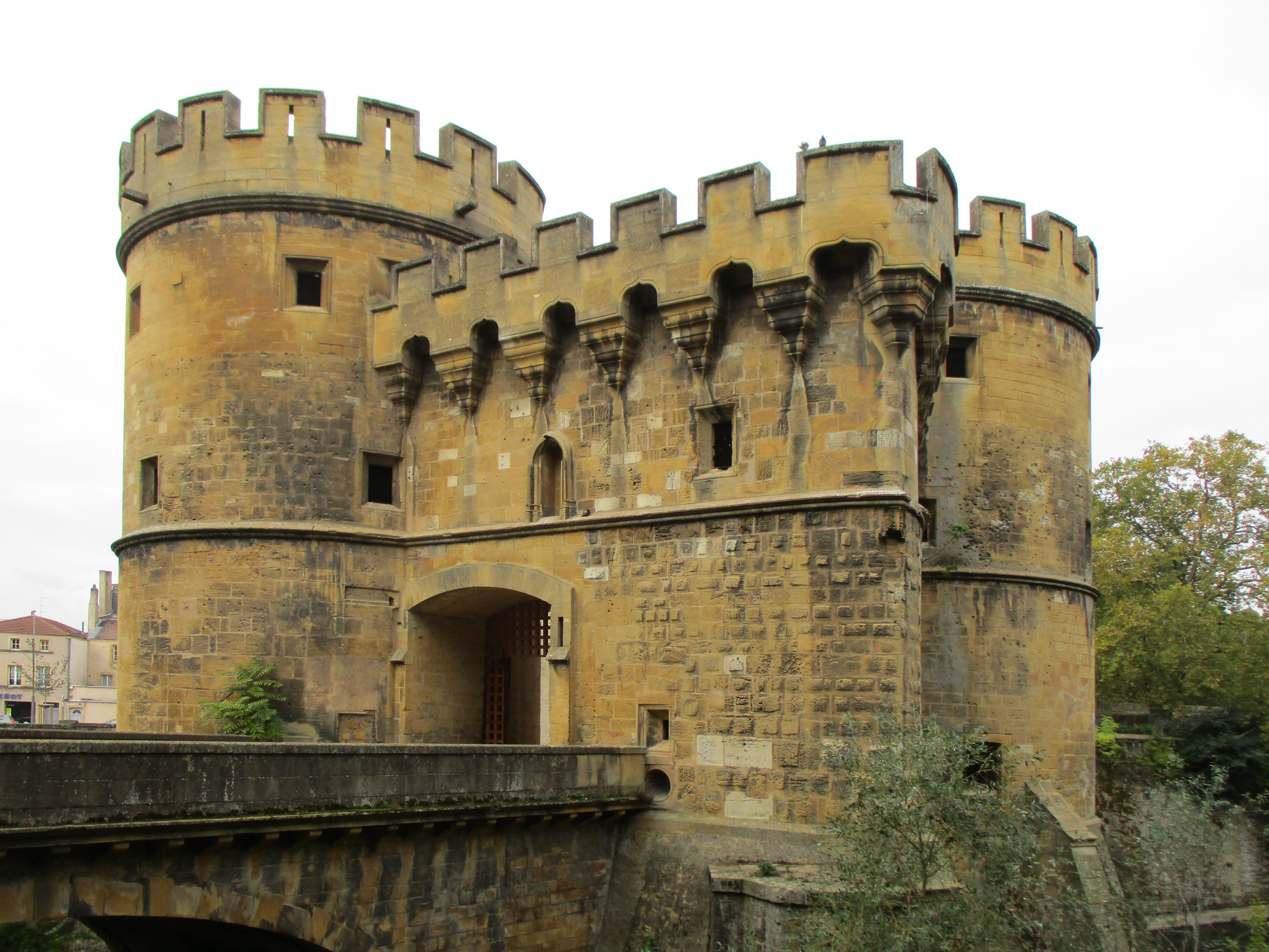
- Germans' Gate is a bridge castle and city gate in Metz.
  France:
  - Porte Narbonnaise, Porte de l'Aude, Porte Saint-Nazaire in Carcassonne
  - Porte de Joigny and Porte de Sens in Villeneuve-sur-Yonne
  - Porte de la Craffe in Nancy
  - Porte des Allemands in Metz
  - Porte Saint-Denis and Porte Saint-Martin in Paris
  - Porte Mars in Reims
  - Porte Cailhau in Bordeaux
  - Porte de la Grosse-Horloge in La Rochelle
  - Porte Mordelaise in Rennes
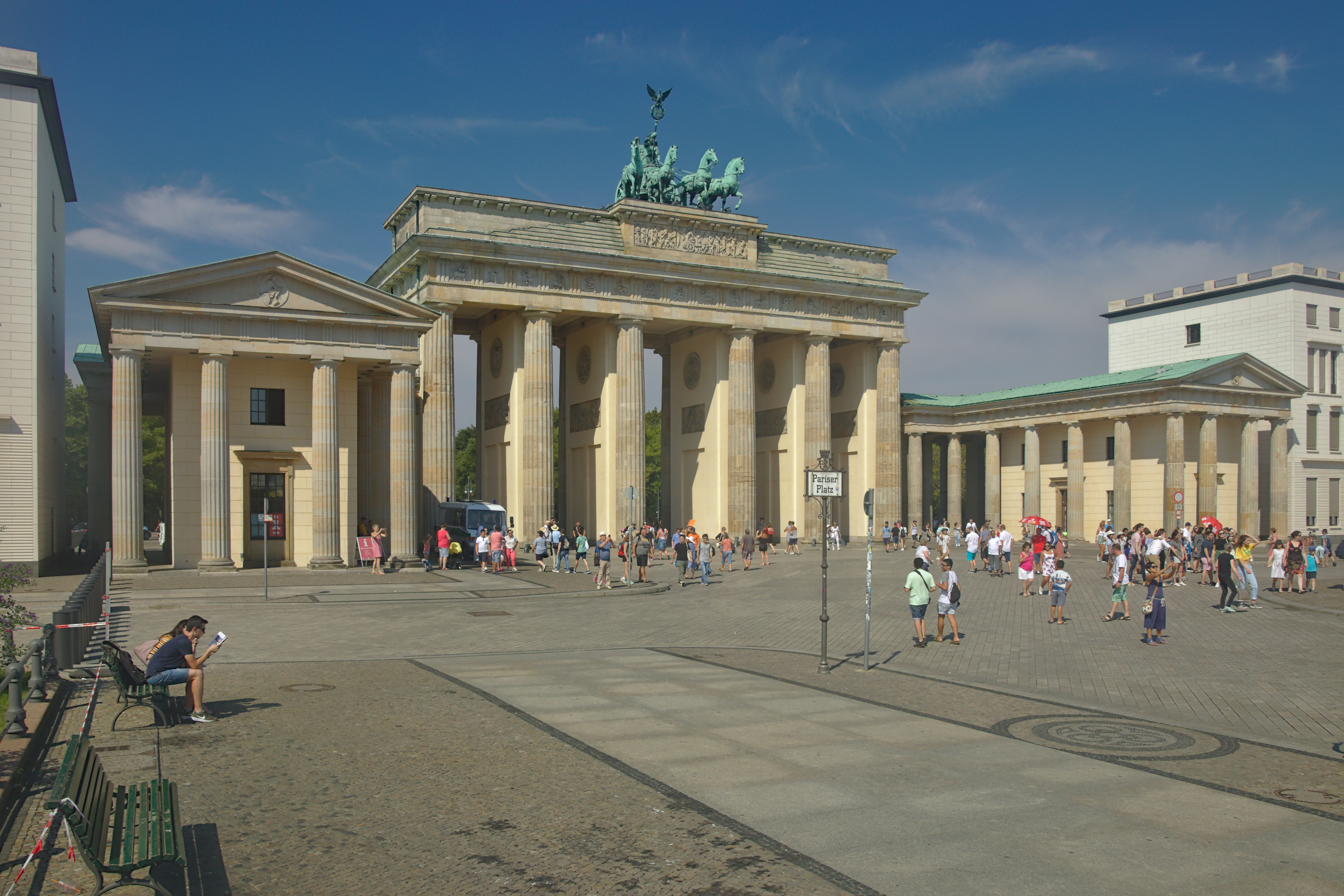
- Brandenburg Gate is a monument and city gate in Berlin.
  Germany:
  - Fünfgratturm in Augsburg
  - Rotes Tor in Augsburg
  - Vogeltor in Augsburg
  - Wertachbrucker Tor in Augsburg
  - Brandenburg Gate, in Berlin
  - Eigelsteintor, Hahnentor, Ulrepforte, Severinstor in Cologne
  - Nordertor, Kompagnietor and Rotes Tor in Flensburg
  - Martinstor (Saint Martin's Gate) and Schwabentor in Freiburg im Breisgau
  - Bayertor in Landsberg am Lech
  - Leipzig City Gates
  - Holstentor, in Lübeck
  - Isartor, Sendlinger Tor, Karlstor and Propylaea in Munich
  - East Gate, in Regensburg
  - Steintor, in Rostock
  - Old Gate, in Speyer
  - Porta Nigra, in Trier
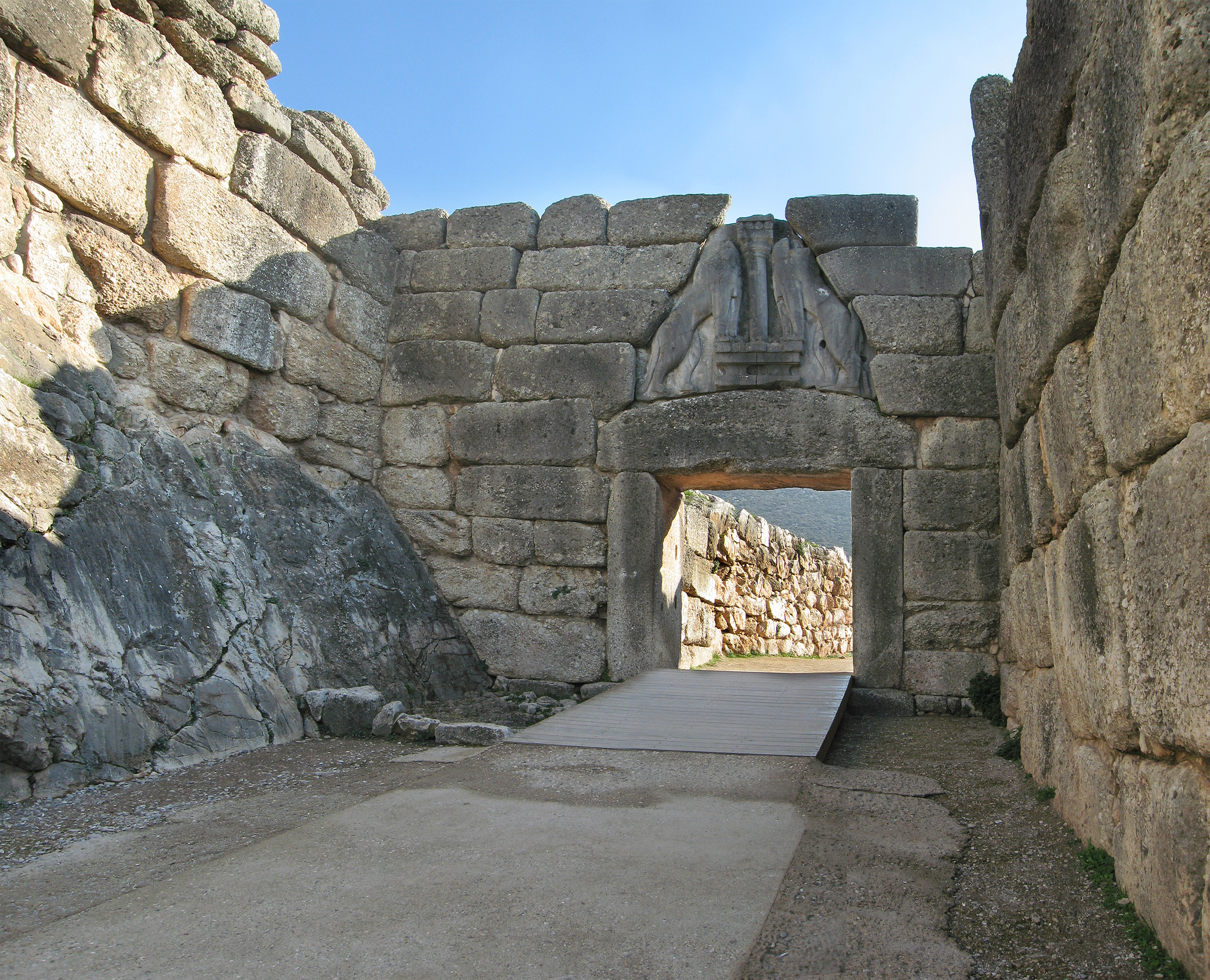
- Lion Gate is a city gate of a Bronze Age citadel in Mycenae.
  Greece: Lion Gate in Mycenae, 13th century BC
- Ireland:
  - Saint Laurence Gate, Drogheda
  - Sheep Gate, Trim
  - St. James's Gate, Dublin
  - gates of Dublin
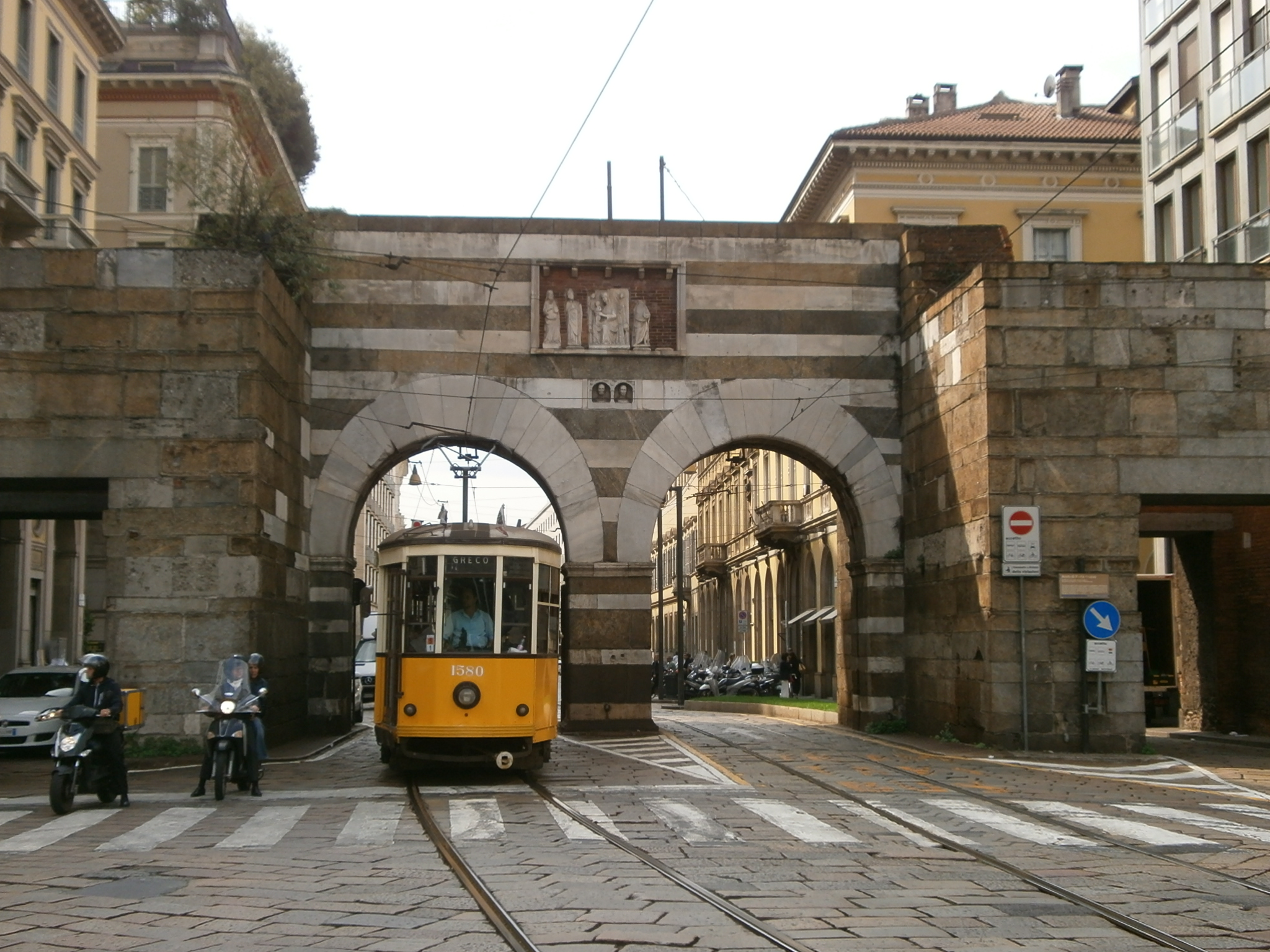
- Archi di Porta Nuova is a medieval city gate in Milan.
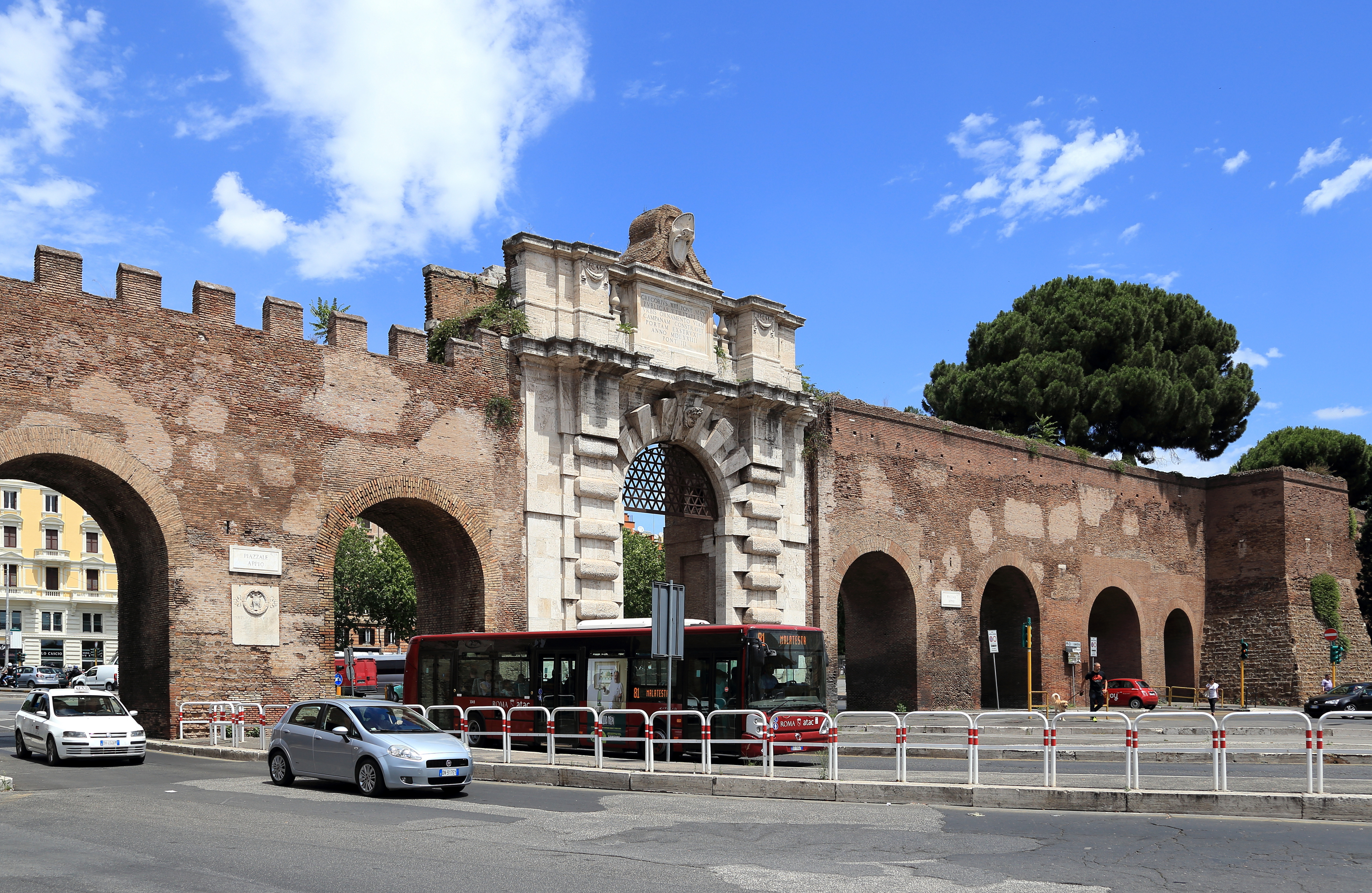
  Porta San Giovanni is a city gate at the Aurelian Wall in Rome.
  Italy:
  - Porta Galliera, Bologna
  - Porta Saragozza, Bologna
  - Porta Paola, Ferrara
  - Pusterla di Sant'Ambrogio, in Milan
  - Porta Nuova (Medieval), in Milan
  - Porta Nuova, in Milan
  - Porta Ticinese (Medieval), in Milan
  - Porta Ticinese, in Milan
  - Porta Capuana, Naples
  - Porta San Gennaro, Naples
  - Port'Alba, Naples
  - Porta Nolana, Naples
  - Porta Felice, in Palermo
  - Porta Nuova, in Palermo
  - Porta Montanara, in Rimini
  - Arch of Augustus, in Rimini
  - Porta San Giovanni, in Rome
  - Porta del Popolo, in Rome
  - Porta Maggiore, in Rome
  - Porta Pinciana, in Rome
  - Porta Tiburtina, in Rome
  - Porta San Sebastiano, in Rome
  - Porta San Paolo, in Rome
  - Porta Camollia, Siena
  - Porta Palatina, in Turin
- Lithuania: Gate of Dawn, in Vilnius
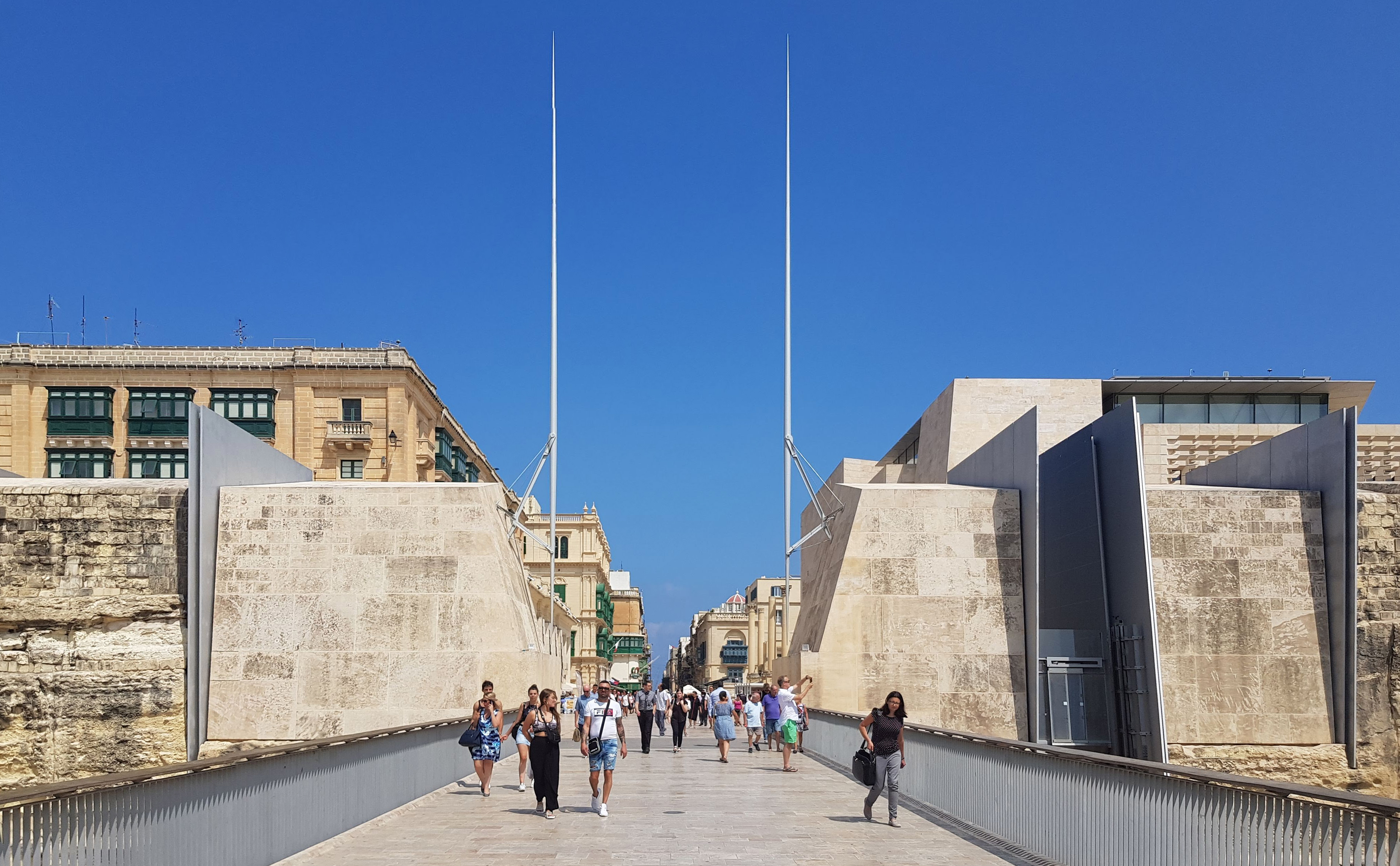
- City Gate (Valletta) at the fortifications of Valletta in Valletta
  Malta:
  - City Gate and Victoria Gate, Valletta
  - Mdina Gate and Greeks Gate, Mdina
  - Notre Dame Gate, Birgu
  - St. Helen's Gate, Cospicua
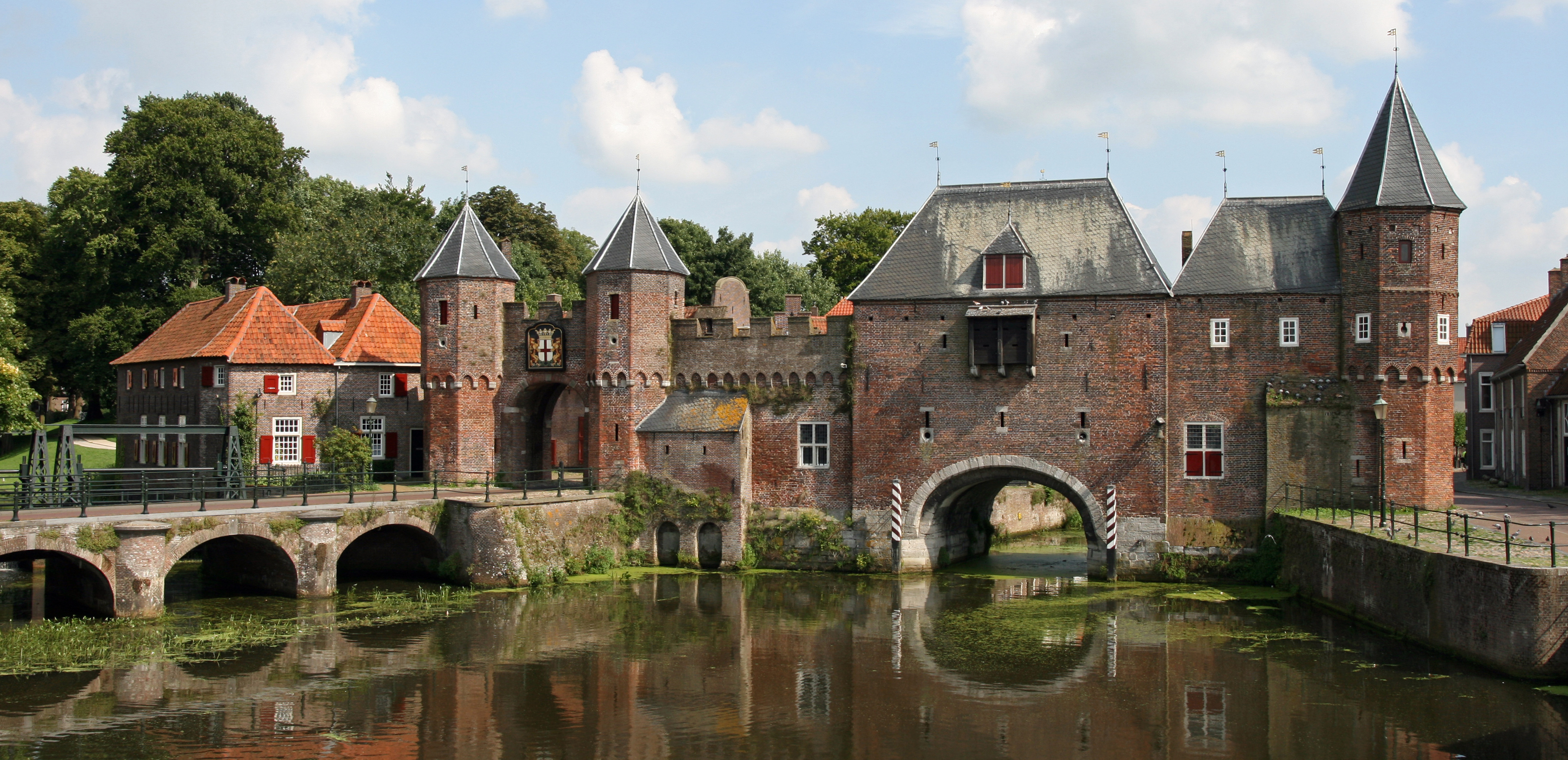
- Koppelpoort is a city gate in Amersfoort.
  Netherlands:
  - Amsterdamse Poort, a city gate of Haarlem
  - Waterpoort (water gate), Sneek
  - Vischpoort (fish gate), Elburg
  - Vischpoort (fish gate), Harderwijk
  - Koppelpoort (combination gate), Amersfoort
  - Monnikendam water gate, Amersfoort
  - Kamperbinnenpoort, Amersfoort
  - Zijlpoort (Eastern gate), Leiden
  - Koepoort (Enkhuizen), Enkhuizen
  - Drommedaris, Enkhuizen
  - Sassenpoort, Zwolle
  - Munttoren, Amsterdam
  - Sint Antoniespoort (de Waag), Amsterdam
  - Muiderpoort, Amsterdam
  - Eastern Gate (Delft), Delft
  - Groothoofdspoort, Dordrecht
  - Koornmarktspoort, Kampen
  - Broederpoort, Kampen
  - Cellebroederspoort, Kampen
  - Gevangenpoort (Lievevrouwepoort) (Prison Gate our Our Lady's Gate), Bergen op Zoom
  - Helpoort, Maastricht
  - Noordhavenpoort, Zuidhavenpoort and Nobelpoort, Zierikzee
  - Oosterpoort, Hoorn
  - Sabelspoort, Arnhem
  - Dijkpoort (Camperpoort), Hattem
  - Veerpoort, Schoonhoven
  - Utrechtsepoort, Naarden
  - Saltpoort / Drogenapstoren, Zutphen
  - Berkelpoort water gate, Zutphen
  - Grendelpoort, Valkenburg
  - Lekpoort, Vianen
  - Waterpoort, Tiel
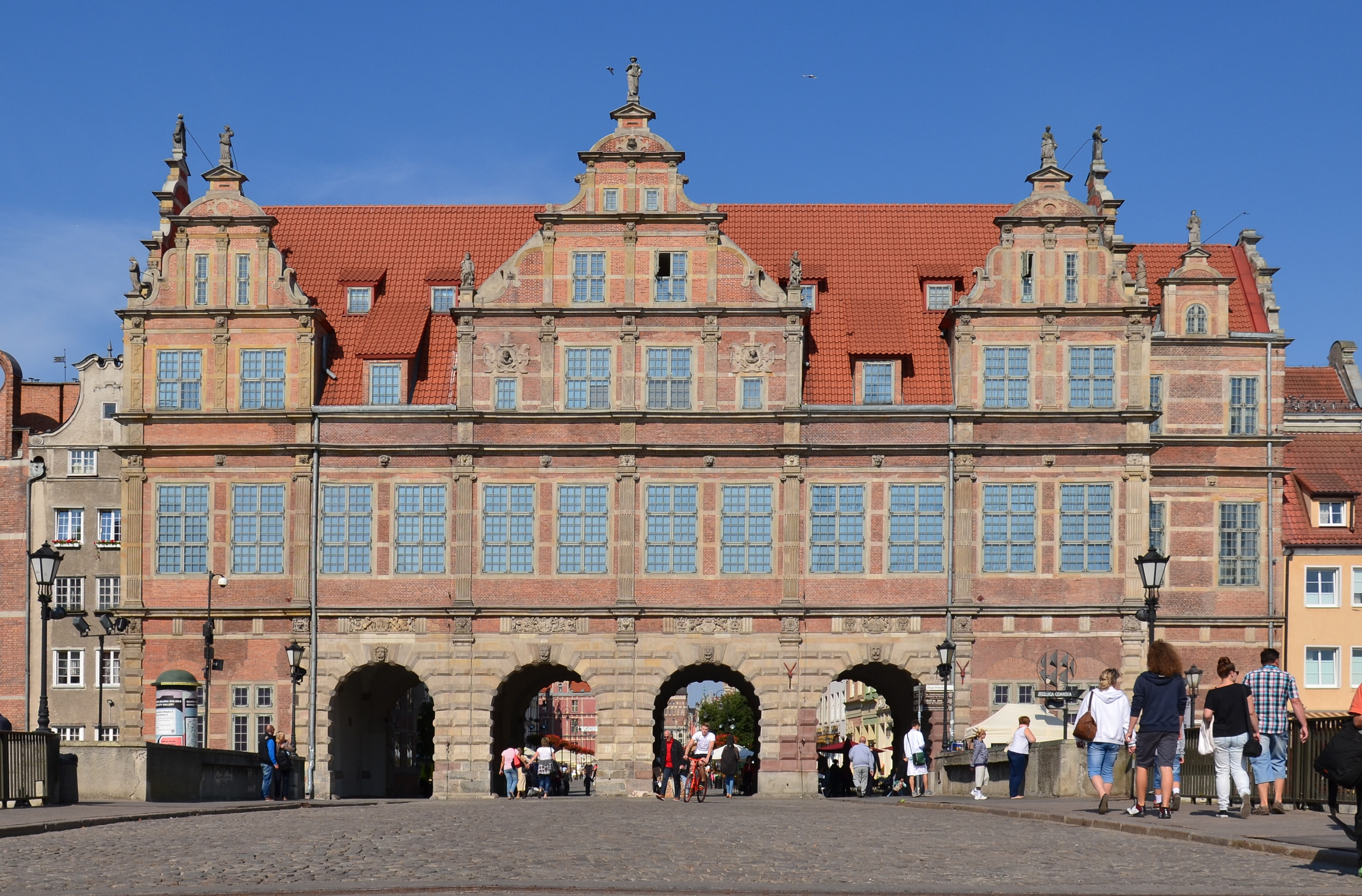
- Green Gate is a city gate in Gdańsk.
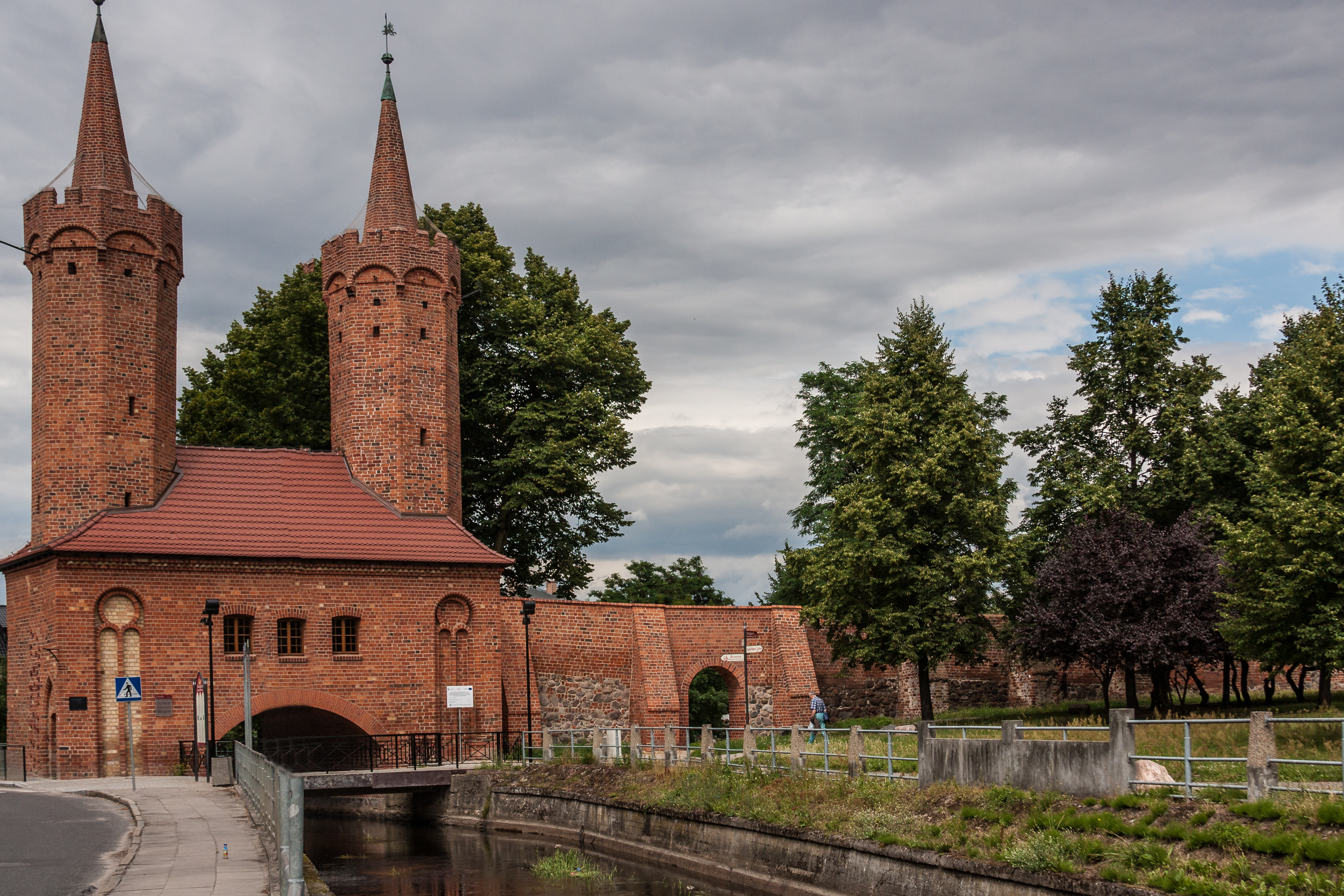
  Stargard Mill Gate is a city and watergate in Stargard.
  Poland:
  - Brama Floriańska (St. Florian's Gate), Kraków
  - Żuraw (Crane Gate), Gdańsk
  - Brama Zielona (Green Gate), Gdańsk
  - Brama Wyżynna (Highland Gate), Gdańsk
  - Brama Mariacka, Gdańsk
  - Brama Krakowska (Kraków Gate), Lublin
  - Brama Mostowa (Bridge Gate), Toruń
  - Brama Klasztorna, Toruń
  - Brama Opatowska, Sandomierz
  - Brama Młyńska (Mill Gate), Stargard
  - Brama Pyrzycka, Stargard
  - Brama Garncarska, Malbork
  - Brama Lidzbarska (Lidzbark Gate), Bartoszyce
  - Nowa Brama (New Gate), Słupsk

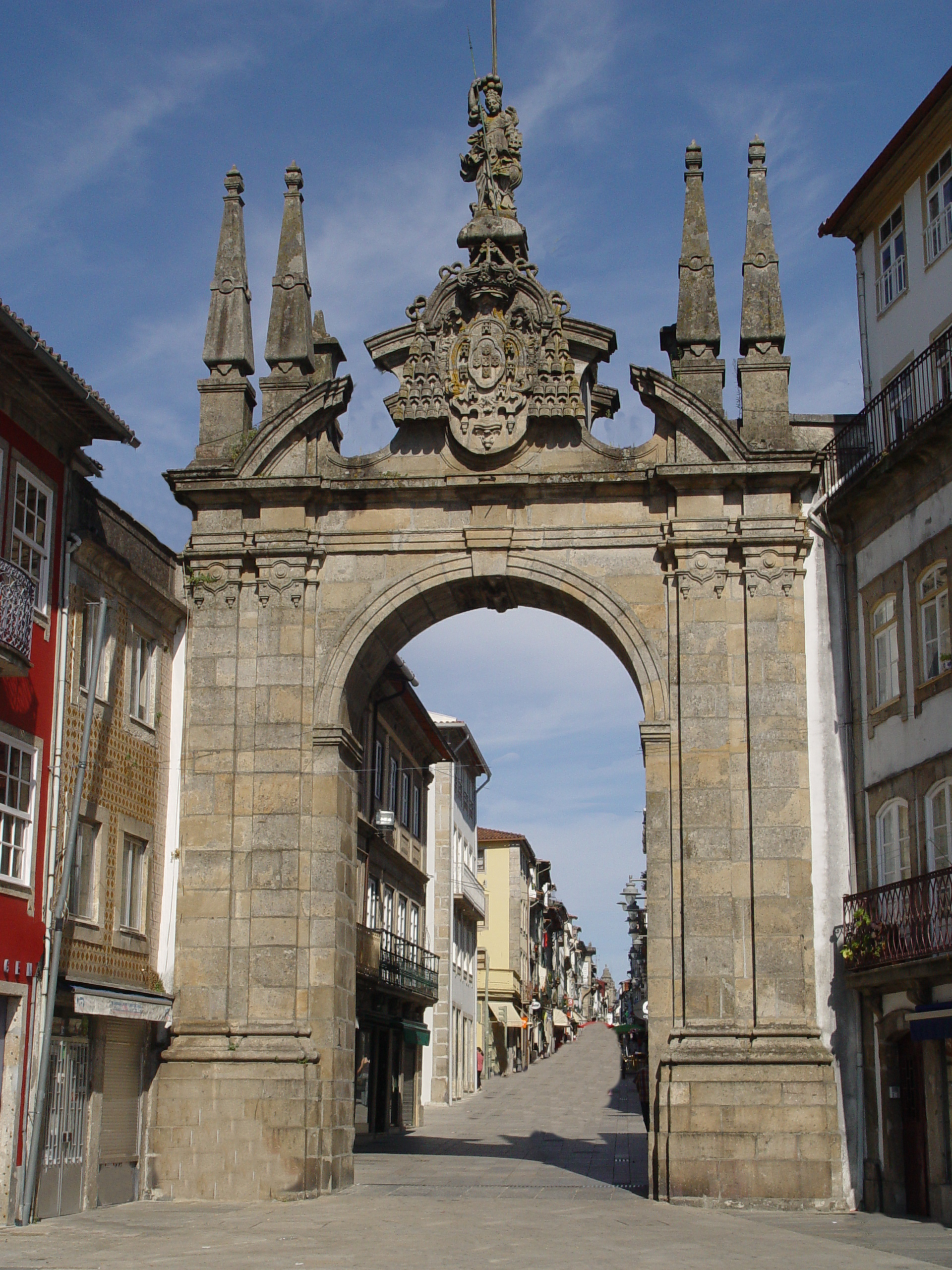
Arco da Porta Nova is a city gate in Braga.

  - Brama Świecka, Chojna
  - Brama Wolińska, Goleniów
  - Brama Odrzańska, Brzeg
  - Brama Portowa (Port Gate), Szczecin
  - Brama Górna, Olsztyn
  - Brama Szczebrzeska, Zamość
- Portugal:
  - Arco da Porta Nova (Arch of the New Gate), Braga
  - Portas da Cidade (City Gate), Ponta Delgada (Azores)
  - Portão dos Varadouros (Beaching Gate) a.k.a. City Gate, Funchal (Madeira)

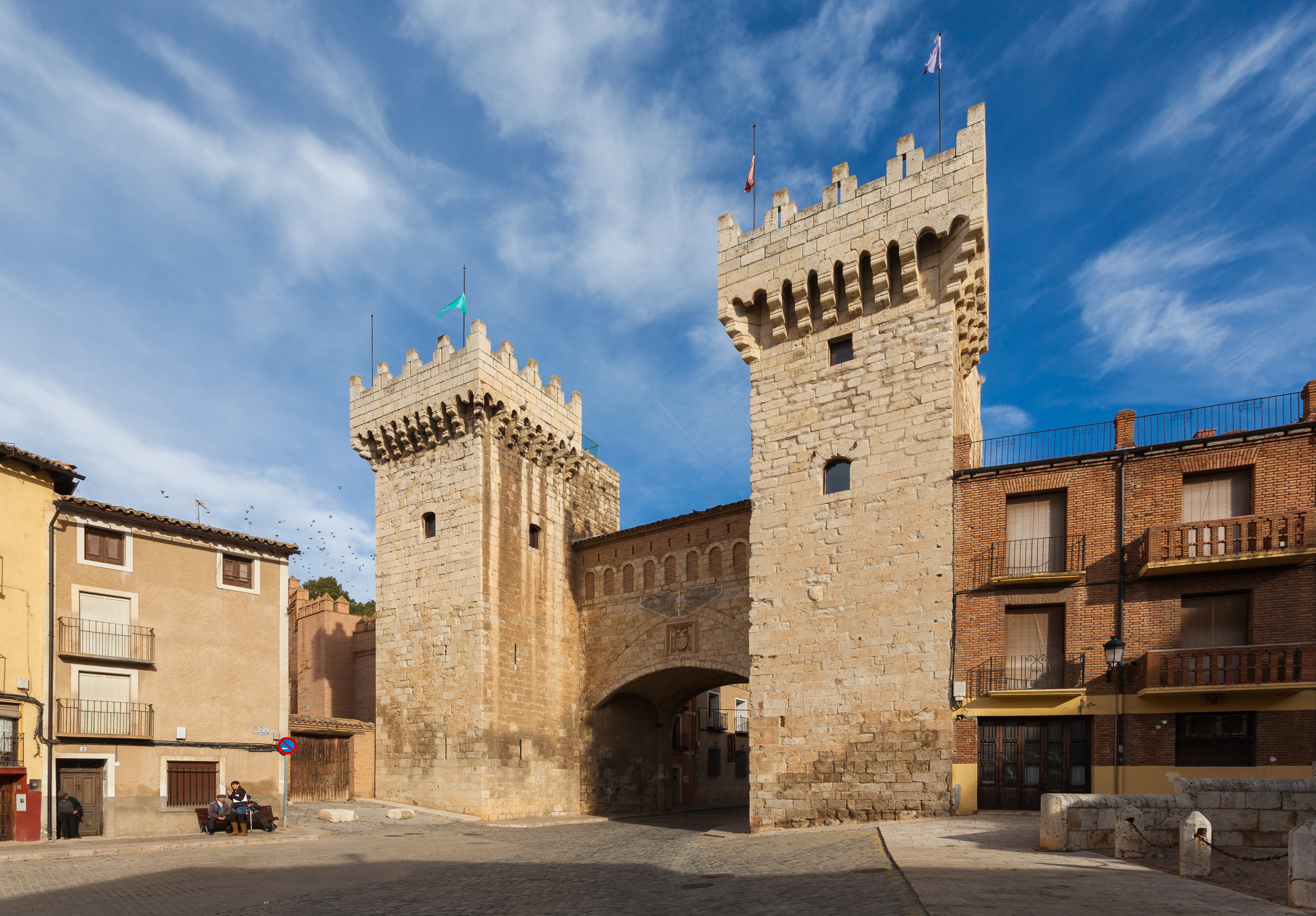
Puerta Baja gate in Daroca, Aragon, Spain, built in the XV century

- Romania: Catherine's Gate, Brașov
- Russia
  - Voskresensky Gate, Moscow
  - Golden Gate, Vladimir
- Slovakia:
  - Michalská brána (Michael's Gate), Bratislava
  - Košická brána, Levoča
- Spain: See Category:City gates in Spain
- Switzerland: The gates of the Basel City Walls, Basel
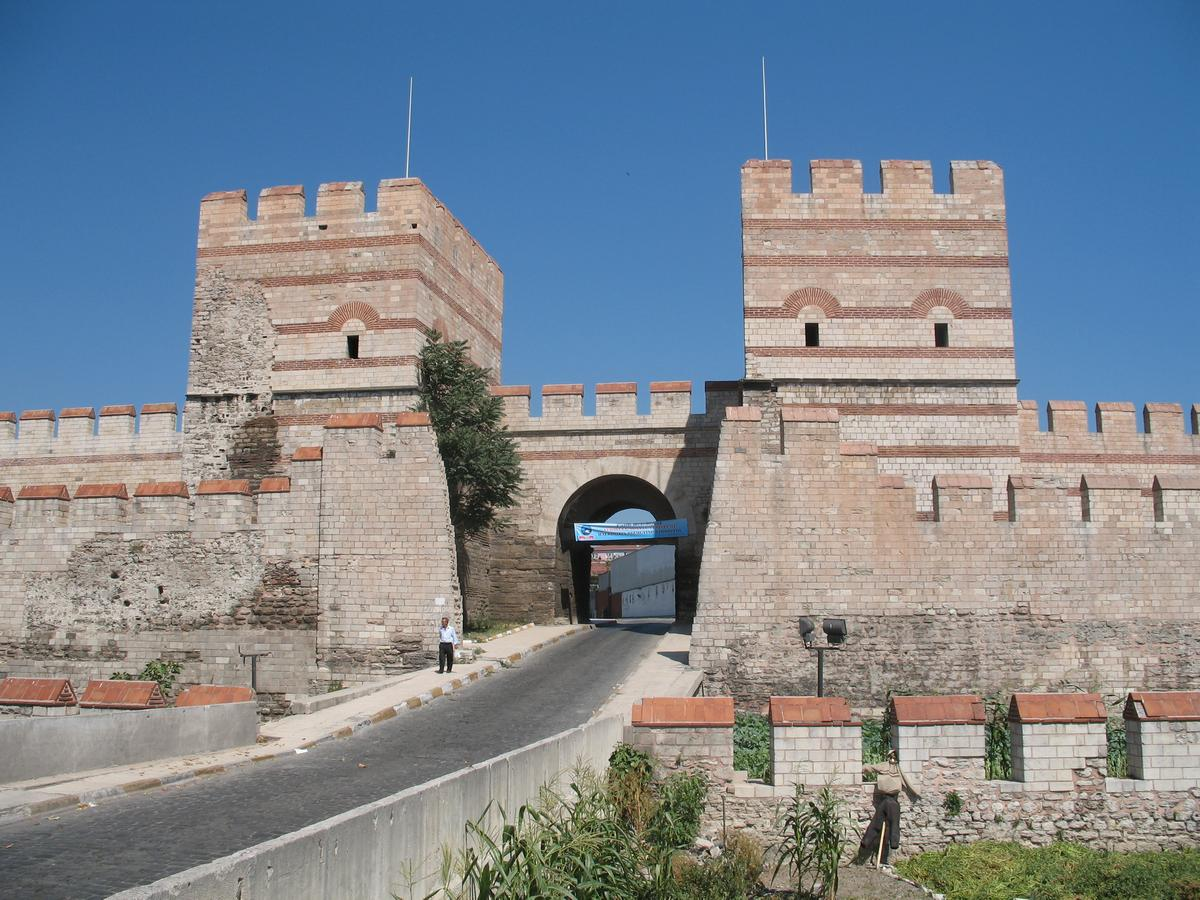
- The Second Military Gate is a city at the Walls of Constantinople.
  Turkey
  - Hadrian's Gate in Antalya
  - The many gates in the walls of Constantinople, present day Istanbul
- Ukraine: Golden Gate, Kyiv
- United Kingdom:
  - Bargate Southampton
  - Derry City Walls and its 7 Medieval City gates
  - London's Roman and Medieval gates of the London Wall: Ludgate, Newgate, Aldersgate, Bishopsgate, Cripplegate, Moorgate, Aldgate
  - Westgate, Canterbury
  - Eastgate, Northgate, Watergate and Bridgegate. Chester
  - The gates (known as Bars) of the York city walls
  - Chepstow Town Gate, Wales

=== Americas ===
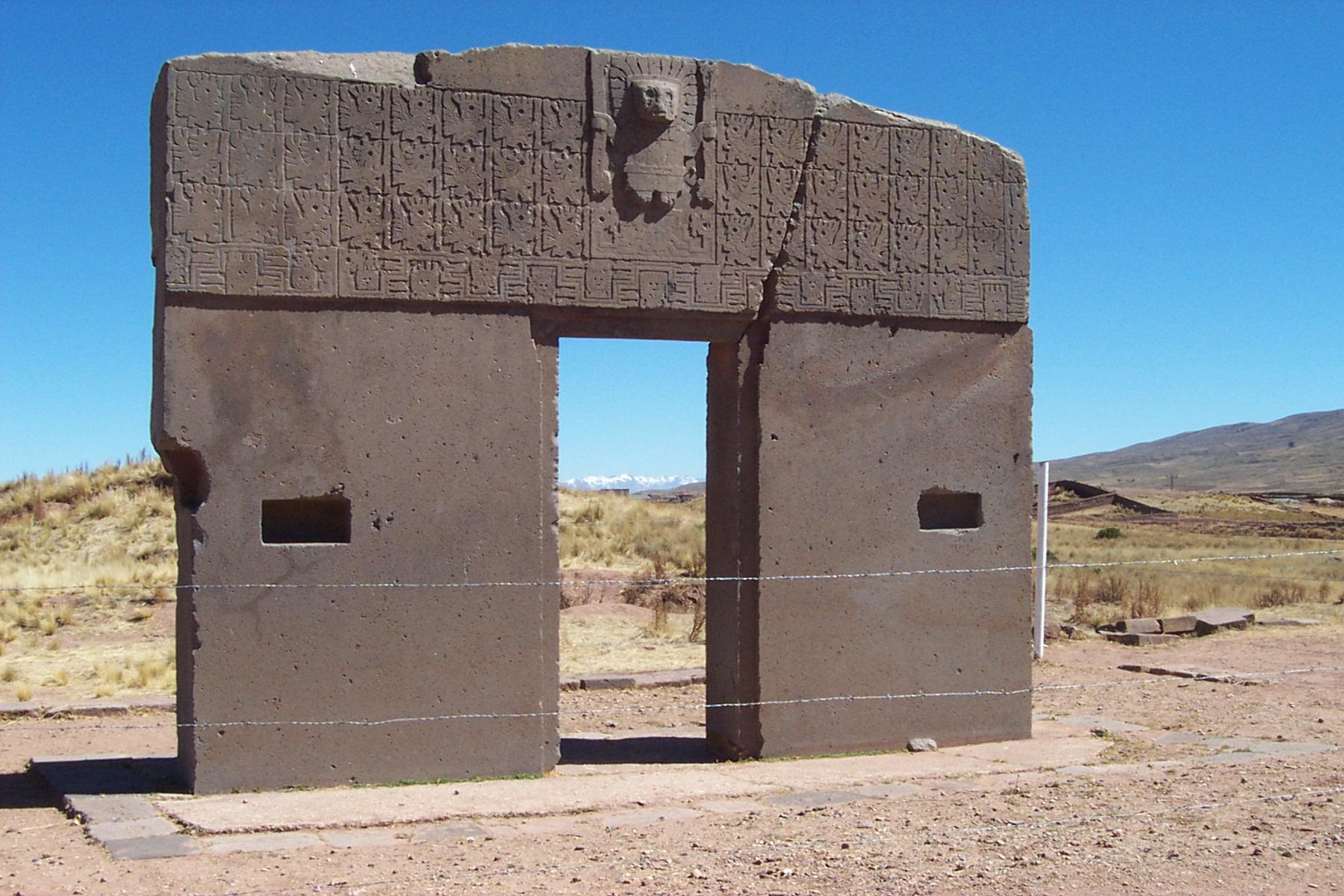
The Gateway of the Sun in Tiwanaku, Bolivia, built between 500 and 950 CE

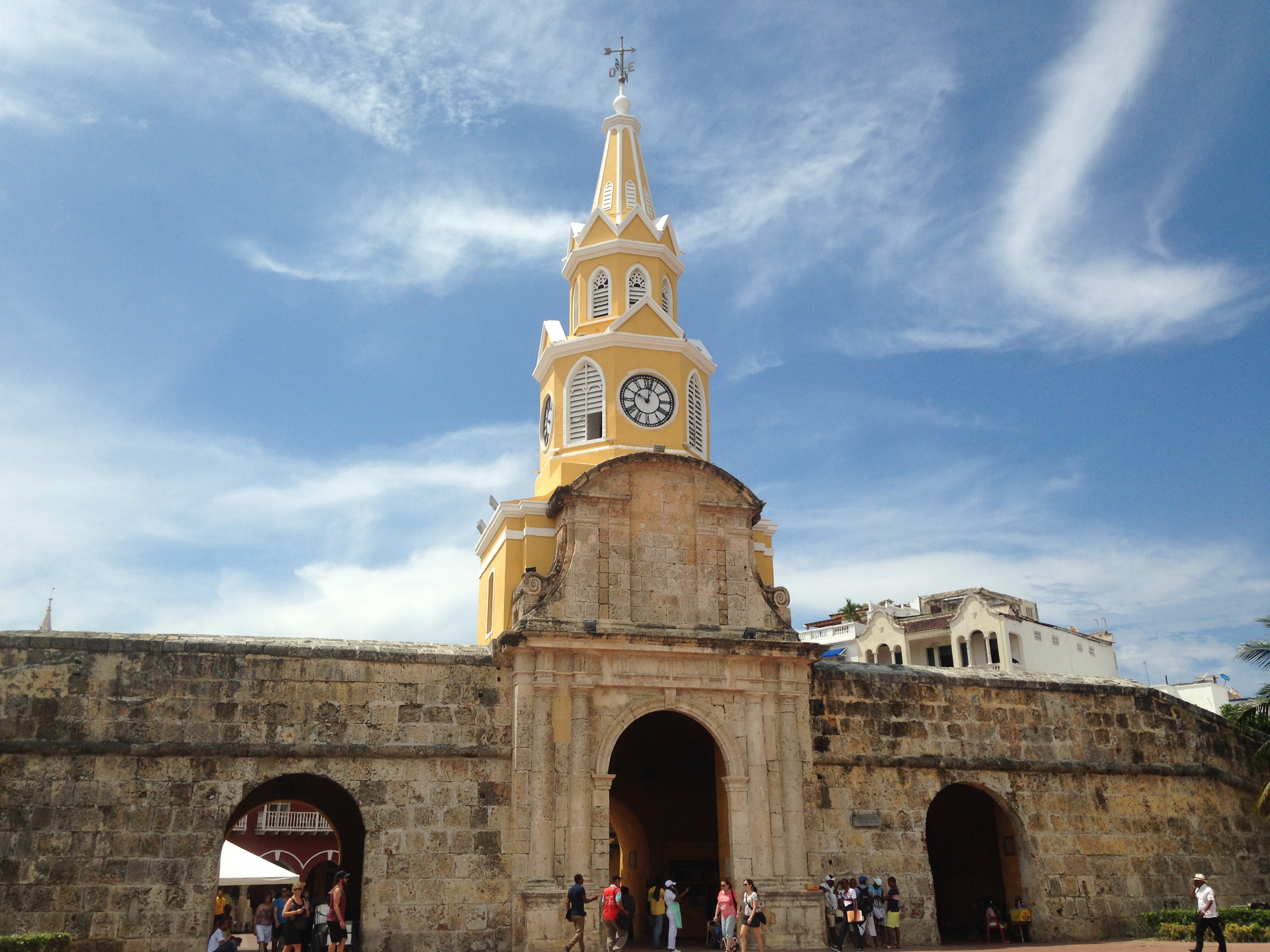
Puerta del Reloj in Cartagena, Colombia, built between 1704 and 1738

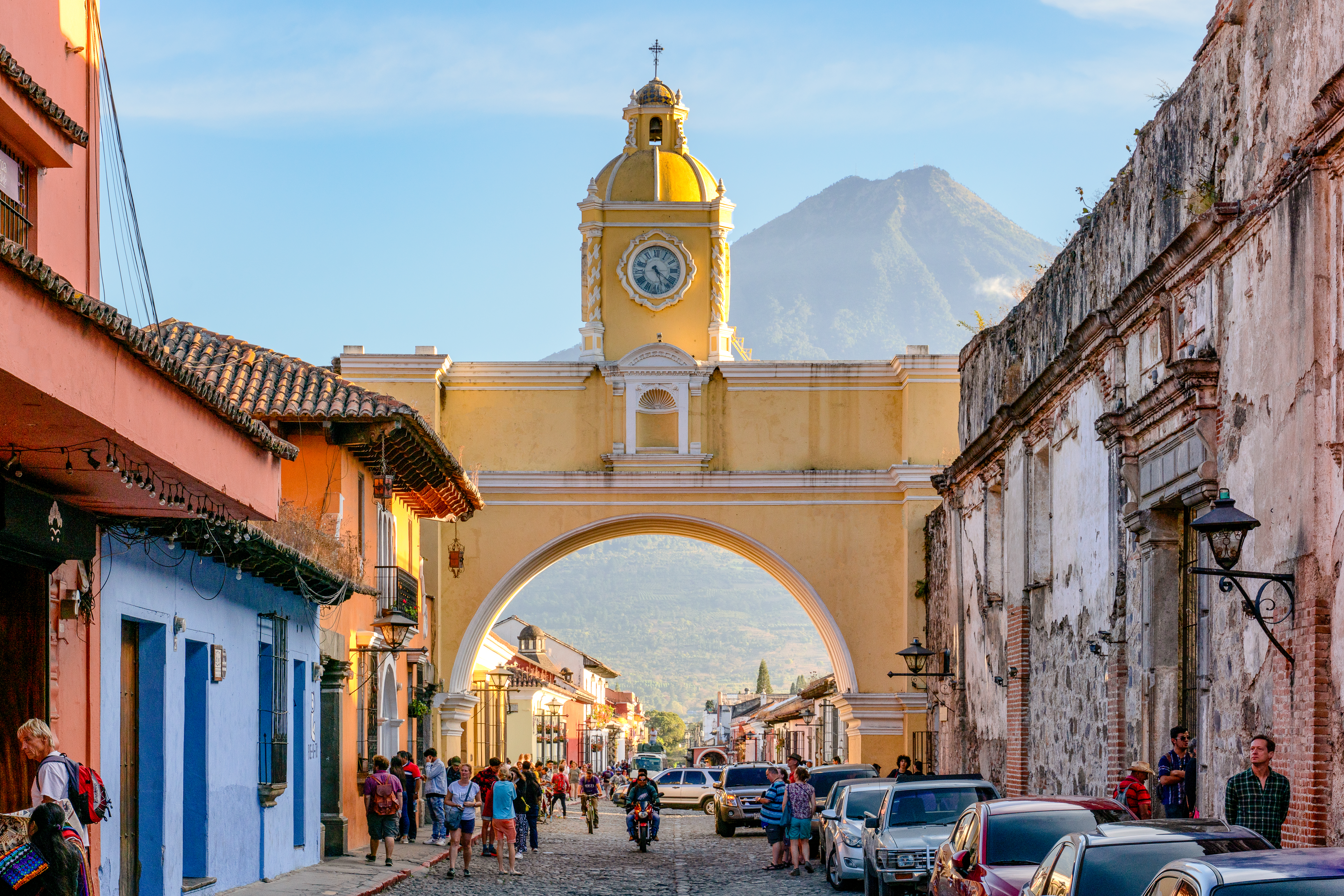
Arco de Santa Catalina in Antigua Guatemala, Guatemala, built in 1693

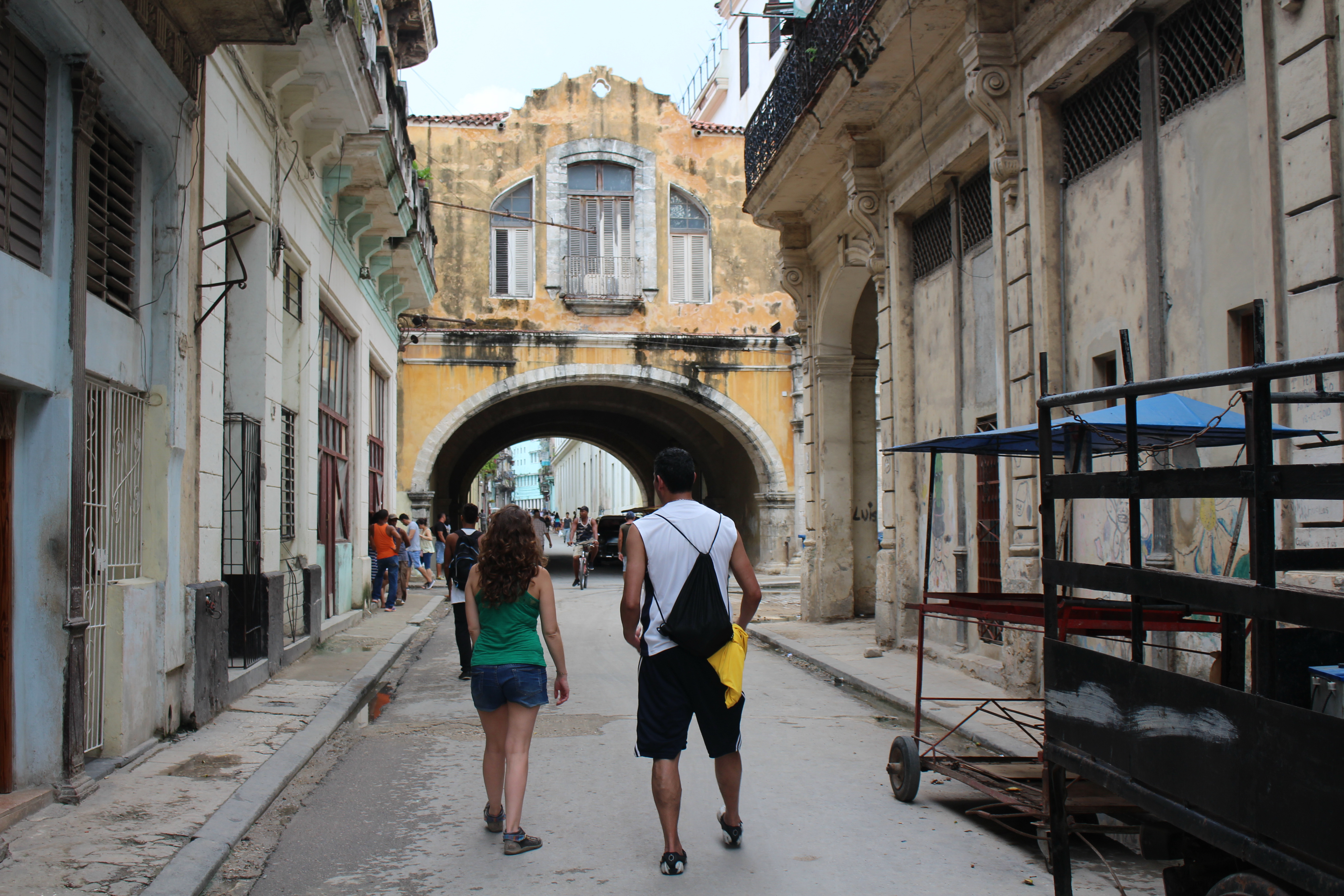
Arco de Belén in Havana, Cuba, built in 1775

- Canada: Kent Gate, Prescott Gate, Saint-Jean Gate, and Saint-Louis Gate at the ramparts of Quebec City
- United States: Two Stone Gates, a Los Angeles Historic-Cultural Monument in Hollywood, California
- Mexico: San Francisco de Campeche, a World Heritage Site, it is a colonial walled city. Are preserved today two city gates: Puerta del Mar completed in 1710, and Puerta de Tierra built in 1732.
- Trinidad and Tobago: City Gate (Port of Spain), Port of Spain
- Puerto Rico:
  - In San Juan, a World Heritage Site, the Walls of the city had five gates. The main was the Puerta de San Juan, today preserved, built in 1635. It also had the Puerta de San José, the Puerta de Santa Rosa, the Puerta de San Justo and the Puerta de Santiago the latter built between 1635 and 1641 by Captain General Íñigo de la Mota Sarmiento.
  - In San Juan, the main gate of the Castle San Felipe del Morro, built between 1589 and 1650.
- Cuba:
  - In Havana, a World Heritage Site, has the Arco de Belén city gate, built in 1775.
  - In Havana, has the main gate of the Fortress of la Cabaña, built between 1763 and 1774.
  - In Havana, the Castle of Príncipe, built between 1767 and 1771, has preserved its great main gate.
- Dominican Republic:
  - In Santo Domingo, a World Heritage Site, its City Walls had seven gates, today are preserved four of them, the Puerta del Conde built between 1543 and 1655, the Puerta Carlos III completed in 1797, the Puerta de las Atarazanas Reales built between 1509 and 1541, and the Puerta de la Misericordia built in 1543, the Walls of Santo domingo is the oldest military construction of European origin in the Americas.
- Guatemala: In Antigua Guatemala, a World Heritage Site, its main city gate the Arco de Santa Catalina is preserved, built in 1693.
- Peru:
  - Machu Picchu's gate, Pre-Columbian, built between 1438 and 1472, a World Heritage Site.
  - The Colonial Walls of Lima had ten gates. The main gate and now defunct was the Arco del Puente, built between 1684 and 1687.
- Uruguay:
  - In Colonia del Sacramento, a World Heritage Site, its main city gate, the Portón de Campo, was built in 1745, under Portuguese government.
  - Gateway of the Citadel in Montevideo.
- Colombia: Puerta del Reloj, built between 1704 and 1738, was the main city gate of Cartagena, Colombia, a World Heritage Site.
- Bolivia: In Tiwanaku, a World Heritage Site, The Gateway of the Sun, was built between 500 and 950 CE, Pre-Columbian.

== See also ==
- Defensive wall
- Gate house
- Gate tower
- Triumphal arch
- Wicket gate
