= T. Cullen Davis =

American oil tycoon (1933–2026)

- Davis in 2000
- Born: Thomas Cullen Davis; September 22, 1933; Fort Worth, Texas, U.S.
- Died: November 6, 2026 (aged 93); Colleyville, Texas, U.S.
- Occupation: Businessman
- Spouse(s): Sandra Masters (m. 1962, divorced) Priscilla Lee Childers (m. 1968, divorced) Karen Master (m. 1979; died 2016) Dana Dixon (m. 2023)

Thomas Cullen Davis (September 22, 1933 – November 6, 2026) was an American oil tycoon who is best known for being acquitted of murder and attempted murder in two high-profile trials during the 1970s. At the time of his first trial, Davis was believed to be the wealthiest man to have stood trial for murder in the United States.

First he was accused of murdering his 12-year-old stepdaughter on August 2, 1976, during a contentious divorce from his second wife, Priscilla Davis. He was found not guilty. The second trial, two years later, involved allegations that Davis attempted to hire a hitman to kill both Priscilla and the judge overseeing his divorce from Priscilla. Again, Davis was acquitted.

== Early life and first trial ==
Thomas Cullen Davis was the middle of three sons born to legendary Fort Worth, Texas, oilman Kenneth W. "Stinky" Davis. His father founded KenDavis Industries International, Inc., which manufactured goods used in the petroleum industry. Davis and his brothers received equal shares of their father's estate upon his death in 1968, and all three were described as possessing keen business instincts.

He had a reputation in Fort Worth society circles for displays of bad temper and general "creepiness", according to female associates.

Cullen Davis' first marriage was to Sandra Masters on August 29, 1962. They had two sons, Cullen Jr. and Brian Davis.

His second marriage was to Priscilla Lee Childers. They were married on August 29, 1968, only hours after the death of his father. It was her third marriage. Priscilla had one daughter from her first marriage, and two children from her second marriage, including Andrea Wilborn.

In 1972, Davis spent $6 million ($46 million today) to build Stonegate Mansion, a five-bedroom, 11-bath mansion with an indoor pool and a 2,000-square-foot (190 m^{2}) master bedroom. In its prime, the luxurious, contemporary home of courtyards, tunnels and balconies at 4100 Stonegate Blvd. was decorated with more than 100 oil paintings.

Davis and Childers separated in 1974 and both began dating other people openly. A judge granted Priscilla the right to live in the Stonegate property during the divorce proceedings and further authorized substantial spousal and child support payments from Davis to Childers. Her live-in boyfriend was Stan Farr, a former basketball star at nearby Texas Christian University.

On August 2, 1976, 12-year-old Andrea Wilborn, who was home alone after returning from a Bible study, was murdered. The body of Andrea would later be found in the basement, apparently shot execution-style. When Childers and her then-boyfriend Stan Farr returned home, both were shot. Farr died at the scene. Childers staggered from the house as family friends Beverly Bass and Gus Gavrel Jr. (who later married), drove up to the mansion. Gavrel was shot, paralyzing him for life.

Childers identified Davis to police, saying he had shot her and Farr, wearing no disguise except a wig. Gavrel (who died on December 6, 2018, of pancreatic cancer, aged 64) said he was shot after Bass recognized the gunman as Davis and called him by name. Police arrested Davis that same night, at the home he shared with Karen Master, his then-girlfriend who would become his third wife. At the first trial, Davis's wealth was estimated at over $100 million ($570 million today).

Davis was only tried for the murder of Andrea. He was defended by famous Texas defense attorney Richard "Racehorse" Haynes. The prosecution case relied almost entirely on eyewitness testimony. Earlier in the day of the shooting, a judge had ordered Davis's monthly support to Priscilla increased from $3,500 to $5,000 ($19,800 to $28,290 today) and to pay her legal fees of $25,000 ($141,450 today) and household expenses of $24,000 ($135,790 today). This change was proposed as a motive for the crimes.

He did not testify in his own defense. Haynes's defense concentrated on two main points. First, the complete lack of physical evidence linking Davis to the crime (no fingerprints, no firearm linked to the murder, etc.). Second, Haynes focused on the eyewitness testimony, particularly Priscilla. Haynes depicted her as living in two worlds: Fort Worth high society, and a milieu of drug dealers, criminals, and sleazy sex. Haynes proposed that Priscilla's admitted heavy use of prescription painkillers made her an unreliable witness who might have been confused about the identity of her attacker.

Journalist Gary Cartwright wrote: "most observers agreed later that the case was won as soon as Haynes completed his cross-examination of Priscilla"; this occurred only two weeks into a three-month trial. Davis was found not guilty. Of the trial, prosecutor Tim Curry said, "We were out-bought and out-thought".

== Other trials ==
In related civil litigation concerning Wilborn's death following the murder trial, Davis prevailed and was held not liable for her death. The children of Stan Farr later sued Davis for wrongful death and received a $250,000 out of court settlement.

In 1978, Davis was arrested again, this time for allegedly hiring a hitman to murder both Priscilla Davis and the judge overseeing their ongoing divorce litigation. The case largely hinged on a tape-recorded conversation between Davis and David McCrory, an undercover employee posing as a hitman for hire, which was recorded in the parking lot of the Coco's Famous Hamburgers restaurant where Davis was arrested. In the recording, Davis was alleged to have asked the undercover employee to murder his wife and the judge. The trial of Texas v. Cullen T. Davis was one of the first uses of forensic discourse analysis on tape-recorded evidence in a legal setting in the United States.

A discourse analyst testified that Davis' words on the tape did not constitute solicitation of murder. Haynes again defended Davis. He again attacked the prosecution's physical evidence: Davis's fingerprints were not found on critical pieces of evidence, such as the cash he allegedly paid to McCrory. Unlike the first trial, Davis testified in his own defense. He stated he had not solicited McCrory's offer to kill Priscilla and the judge, and claimed it was a plot orchestrated by her to frame him. Davis claimed he merely played along with the plot in an attempt to eventually convince McCrory to admit Priscilla was to blame for the entire scheme.

Unlike the first trial where observers were convinced Davis would likely be acquitted, opinion was split in the second trial with the general consensus being Davis's best hope was a hung jury. After a lengthy trial Davis was acquitted a second time.

Due to the prominence of the case, in 2015 Tarrant County authorities chose to keep the paper court documents of the case as historical documents even though they have been digitized.

== Later life and death ==
Davis married Karen Master on June 5, 1979, in Fort Worth. He adopted her two sons Trey Master and Chesley Master.

Davis lost most of his oil fortune in the recession of the 1980s, and eventually declared bankruptcy.

Cullen and Karen Davis sold their home and 300-acre (120 ha) property to a real estate developer in 1984. Davis continued to live in the Fort Worth area.

Karen Davis died of organ failure on September 22, 2016. Davis, in later life, became a born-again Christian, and at one point worked with televangelist James Robison.

Priscilla Lee Childers died due to breast cancer on February 19, 2001, at the age of 59, still adamantly insisting on Davis' guilt.

Davis died at his home in Colleyville, Texas, on November 6, 2026, at the age of 93.

== In books and television ==
In books, the case has been addressed in:

- Blood Will Tell: The Murder Trials of T. Cullen Davis, written by Gary Cartwright and published by Harcourt in 1979
- Texas Justice, also written by Gary Cartwright
- Texas vs. Davis, written by Mike Cochran
- Final Justice: The True Story of the Richest Man Ever Tried for Murder, written by Steven Naifeh and Gregory White Smith and published by Onyx in 1994
- The case was covered in a chapter of Creating Language Crimes by Roger Shuy, a linguistics professor who was a witness for the defense in the murder-for-hire case.

On television, the case has been profiled on:

- Texas Justice, a 1995 TV movie based on the Gary Cartwright book of the same name, starring Peter Strauss and Heather Locklear
- TruTV's Dominick Dunne's Power, Privilege and Justice - Oil, Money, and Mystery
- A&E's American Justice in an episode titled "Oil, Money, and Murder"
- Investigation Discovery's Behind Mansion Walls, the sixth episode of the first season
- CBS's 48 Hours in an episode titled "Murder in the Mansion".
