= Tim Curry (attorney) =

American attorney (1938–2009)

District Attorney of Tarrant County, Texas
- In office 1972–2009

Personal details
- Born: Timothy Cullen Curry; September 18, 1938 Tulia, Texas, US
- Died: April 24, 2009 (aged 70) Fort Worth, Texas, US
- Cause of death: Lung cancer
- Party: Republican (1990-2009); Democratic (before 1990)
- Education: Texas Christian University; Baylor Law School
- Occupation: Lawyer

Timothy Cullen Curry (September 18, 1938 – April 24, 2009) was an American attorney who served as the District Attorney of Tarrant County, Texas from 1972 until his death in 2009.

Curry was selected to run for District Attorney of Tarrant County after the original choice for nominee backed out just before the 1972 election. Curry was 34 years old when he took office on November 27, 1972. He was first elected as a Democrat but switched to the Republican Party in 1990, along with other Tarrant County elected officials who followed a change in the political leanings there. Curry died shortly after midnight on April 24, 2009, at the age of 70 of complications of lung cancer.

The Tarrant County justice center was renamed to Tim Curry Criminal Justice Center shortly after his death.

Curry was the prosecutor in the trial of oilman T. Cullen Davis.
