= Tallinn Gate =

City gate in Pärnu, Estonia

Coordinates: 58°23′1″N 24°29′45″E

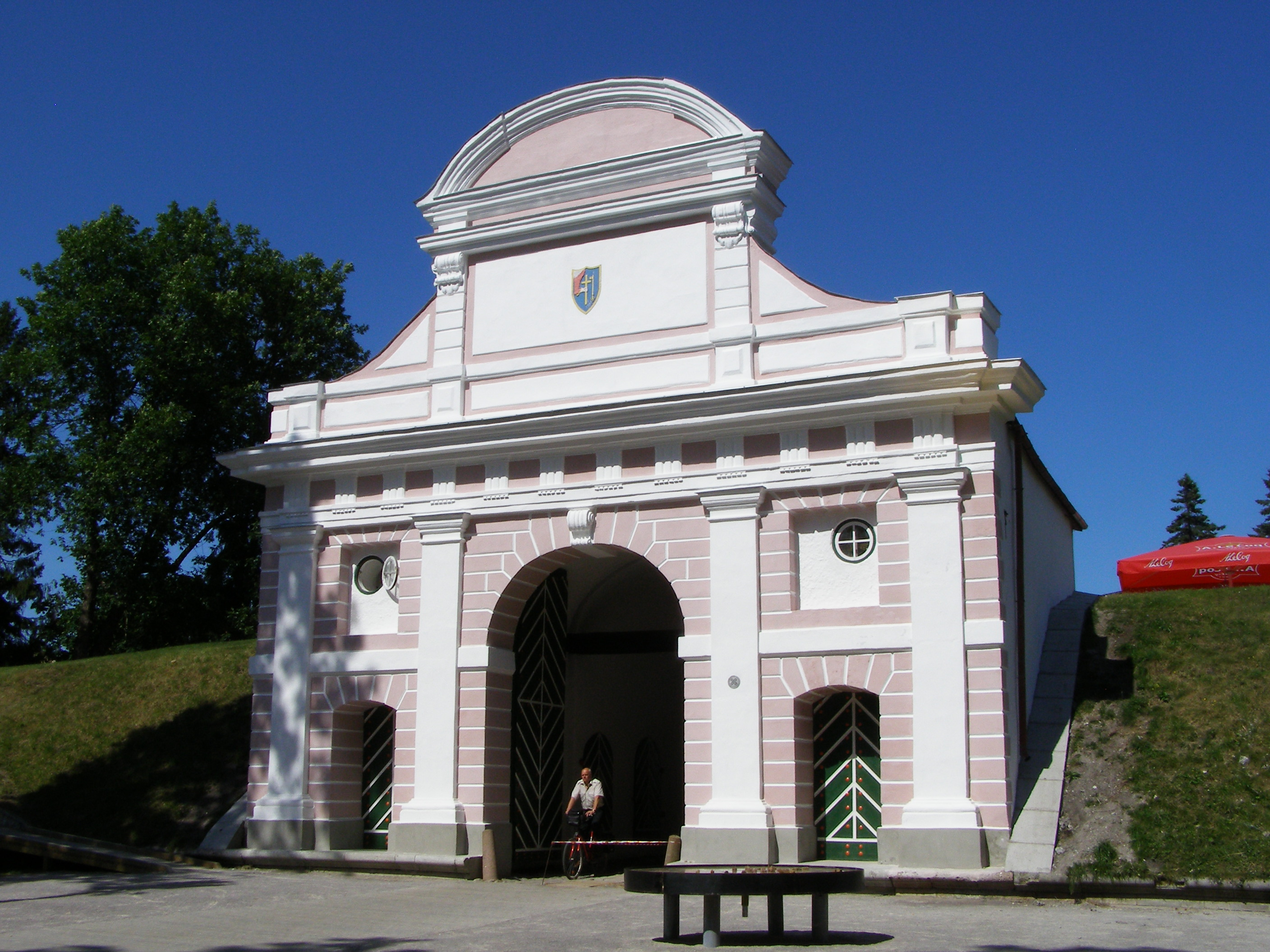
Tallinn Gate in Pärnu

Tallinn Gate (Estonian: Tallinna värav) is a city gate in the historical fortifications of Pärnu, Estonia.

The gate may have been constructed to designs by Erik Dahlbergh during the time of Swedish rule of Estonia. Before 1710 and the capitulation of Estonia and Livonia to Russian forces during the Great Northern War, it was named after the Swedish king Charles Gustav. Since it led to the road to Tallinn it then became known as the Tallinn Gate. When the fortifications of Pärnu were demolished in the 19th century, only Tallinn Gate was preserved and it remains the only surviving city gate from the 17th century in the Baltic states.
