= Stonegate Mansion =

Building in Fort Worth, Texas

Coordinates: 32.71267°N 97.38191°W

The Stonegate Mansion was located at the edge of the Stonegate neighborhood in Fort Worth, TX near the Texas Christian University campus on a hill overlooking downtown Fort Worth. Built by multimillionaire oilman T. Cullen Davis, the mansion, once a private home, has been a restaurant, a church and most recently has been renovated to become an event facility used for weddings, parties, meetings and charitable events.

The Stonegate Mansion also serves as an art gallery for local and regional artists, holding its first event as member of the Fort Worth Art Dealer's Association on Saturday, March 29, 2008.

== History ==
The Stonegate neighborhood is part of the 1854 Samuel C. Inman Survey. The area is bordered on the north by the Clear Fork of the Trinity River, on the east and south by the Tanglewood neighborhood and the west by Hulen Street.

An original owner of the 304 acres (1.23 km^{2}) was Matilda F. Burford. The records show that Mrs. Burford owned the Stonegate property in 1918. A house and barns were built on the property in 1925.

In 1927, 10.24 acres (41,400 m^{2}) were sold to the T & P Railroad, along the northern edge of the area, by the river. And in 1940 the present day Stonegate property was sold in judgment to Kenneth W. Davis. In 1968 the ownership transferred to his sons Kenneth W. Davis, Jr., Thomas Cullen Davis and William S. Davis.

In 1972, Cullen Davis spent $6 million to build the five-bedroom, 11-bath mansion with an indoor pool and a 2,000-square-foot (190 m^{2}) master bedroom. In its prime, the luxurious, contemporary home of courtyards, tunnels and balconies at 4100 Stonegate Blvd. was decorated with more than 100 oil paintings. The mansion was designed by Albert S. Komatsu and Associates.

In 1976, Andrea Wilborn and Stan Farr were killed in the mansion. The killer was described as a man in black who wore a black wig.

Three witnesses described Davis as the shooter. However, in a trial in Amarillo he was acquitted of the killing of his 12-year-old stepdaughter, Andrea Wilborn, who was murdered execution-style in the basement. Prosecutors also later dismissed charges related to the killing of former TCU basketball player Stan Farr, who police found dead in the kitchen, and the wounding of Davis’ estranged wife, Priscilla, and her friend Gus "Bubba" Gavrel. Davis’ oil-based business empire later crumbled. He moved out of the mansion in 1983 and declared bankruptcy in 1987.

The Tarrant Appraisal District lists the value of the mansion and property at $1.64 million.

In December 2021, demolition of the mansion began to make way for another real estate development
