= Brusselpoort =

Former city gate in Mechelen, Belgium

- Mechelen, Belgium
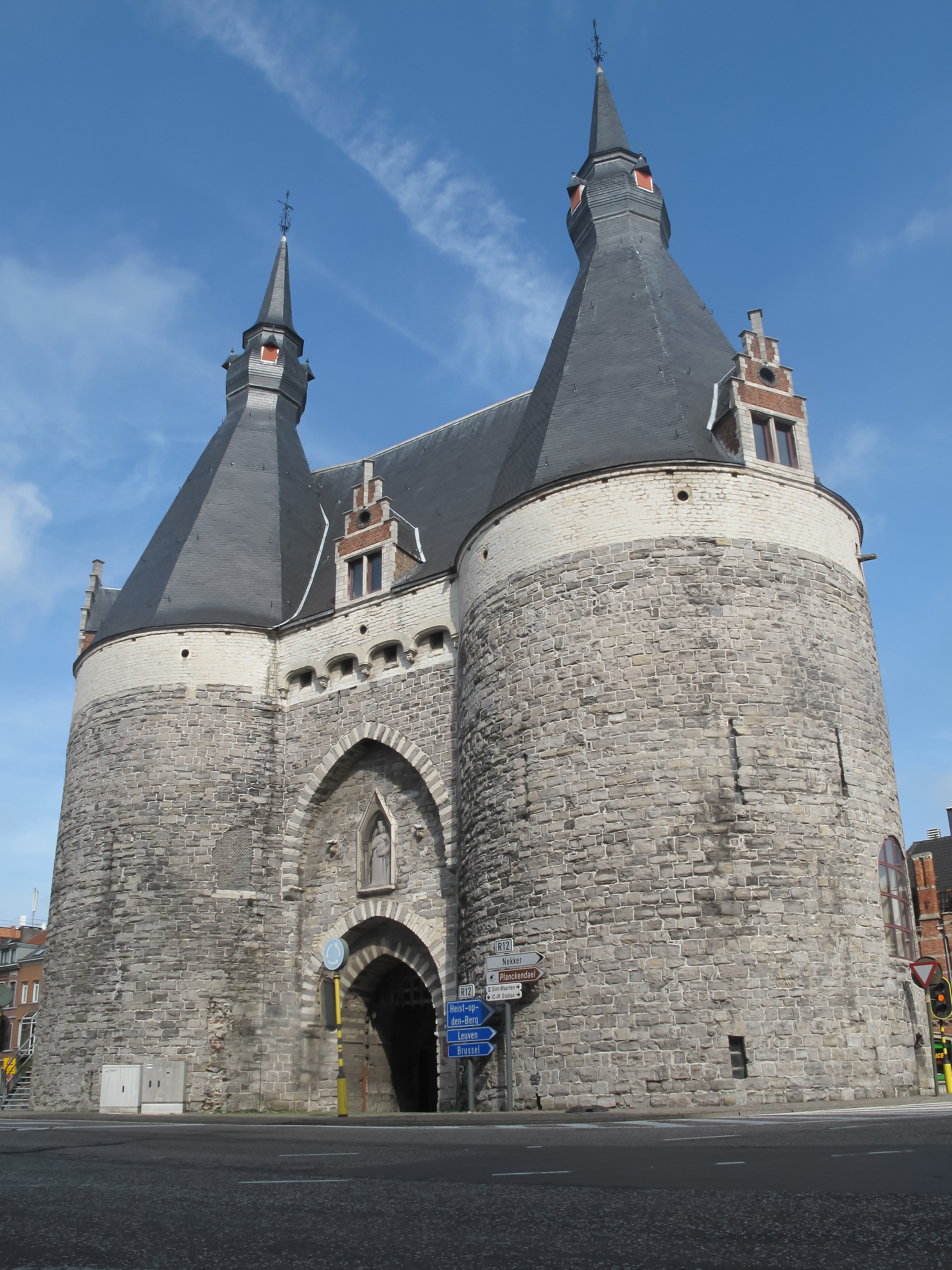
- The Brusselpoort in Mechelen

Site information
- Type: City gate

Location
- Coordinates: 51°1′18″N 4°28′25″E

Site history
- Built: 13th century
- Materials: Stone

The Brusselpoort (English: Brussels Gate) is the sole remaining city gate of the original twelve gates of Mechelen, Belgium. This imposing structure dates from the 13th century. Because of its exceptional height, towering above the other gates, it was also called the Overste Poort ("Superior Gate"). In the 16th century, the towers were lowered and the roof construction was altered to the present configuration.

In the course of the centuries, the building had many different uses: from police station to youth centre, from duty collector's office to artist's workshop (Alfred Ost). It then became a museum about the city's history containing documents and archaeological finds. The collection of the De Maan City Puppet Theater is currently stored there. The Brusselpoort is not accessible to visitors.
