= Stonegate Bank =

Bank in the United States

- Company type: Private
- Founded: 2005
- Headquarters: Pompano Beach, Florida, United States
- Key people: David Seleski (President & Chief Executive)
- Website: stonegatebank.com

Stonegate Bank is an American bank headquartered in Pompano Beach, Florida.

== History ==
Stonegate Bank was established in 2005 by David Seleski. It has "21 banking offices in south and west Florida, mainly in Broward, Charlotte, Collier, Hillsborough, Lee, Miami-Dade, Palm Beach and Sarasota counties." By June 2015, it had "$2.27 billion in assets and $1.93 billion in deposits."

In 2017, Stonegate was bought by Home BancShares.

== Activities in Cuba ==
Since 2015, it has been active in Cuba. It is the only US bank to be used by the Cuban government. For example, it is used to process Cuban visa fees. Meanwhile, the bank also signed a contract with Banco Internacional de Comercio to serve as its correspondent bank.

The bank has been criticized by Cuban-born Republican Congresswoman Ileana Ros-Lehtinen for its activities in Cuba.
