= Porta Paola, Ferrara =

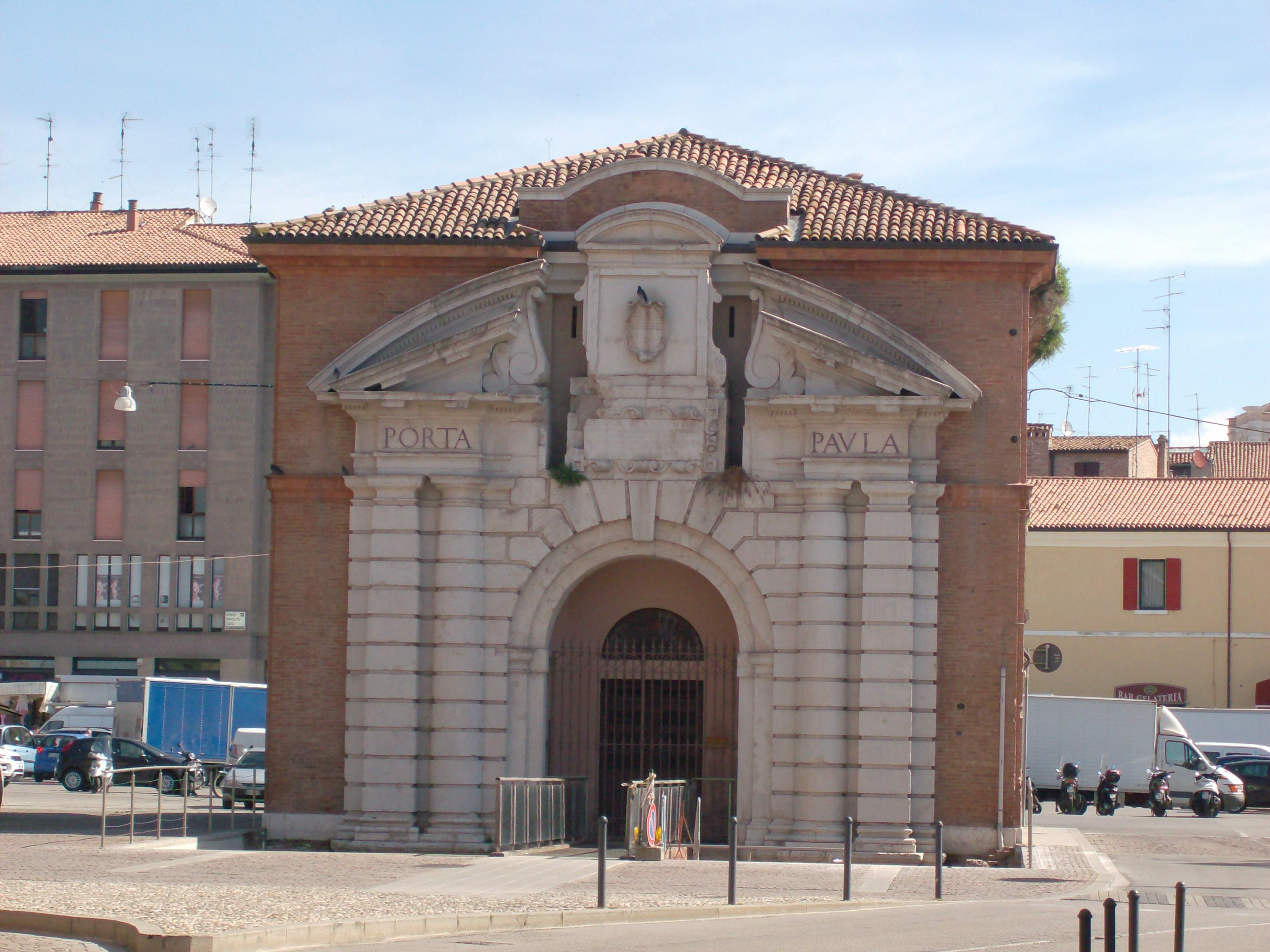
Porta Paola

The Porta Paola is a Baroque architecture city gate located on Via Bologna in Ferrara, region of Emilia-Romagna, Italy.

== History ==
It was built as the entry control point from the south in the city walls in 1612 by Giovanni Battista Aleotti and dedicated to the reigning Pope Paul V. During the French occupation, the gate transiently was renamed Porta Reno; presently the outer face sports the Pauline name, while the city-side retains a plaque with the latter name. The buildings suffered damage during the 2012 earthquake, requiring restructuring.

The external portal has rusticated stone blocks, giving the entrance solidity befitting a fortress gate. The tympanum is interrupted superiorly with a plaque holding the papal shield. During the 19th century, the building was detached from the adjacent city walls, and most of the external moat was filled in.
