= Oder Gate, Brzeg =

Oder Gate
- Brama Odrzańska
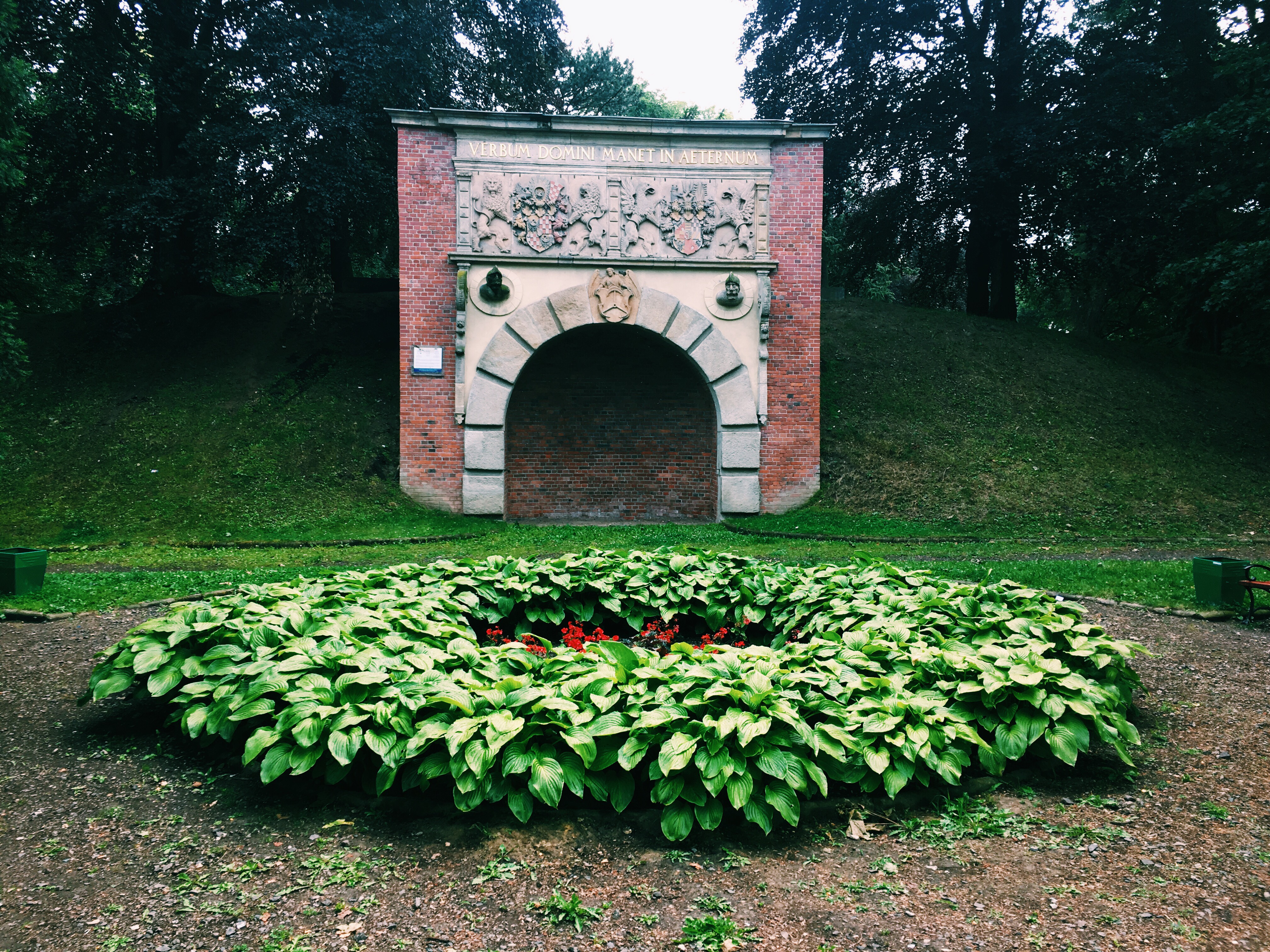
- Odrzańska Gate
- Interactive map of the Oder Gate area

General information
- Type: Gate
- Architectural style: Renaissance
- Location: Brzeg, Poland
- Coordinates: 50°51′54″N 17°28′00″E
- Completed: 1595

Design and construction
- Architects: Bernard Niuron and Peter Niuron

Oder Gate is a gate in a system of fortifications of the town of Brzeg. The gate was built as part of the late Renaissance project by Bernard and Peter Niuron, Italian architects, in the year of 1595, which is located on a bastion which protects the Brzeg Castle from the side of the river Oder.

The gate was built out of sandstone, and built by masons Schober and Kockert, has the form of a triumphal arch. The gate was put out of service in 1895 (together with the gate bastion) and moved to the nearby castle park.

The gate was topped with the call of the Princes of Brzeg VERBUM DOMINI MANET IN AETERNUM which from Latin translates into The word of the Lord endures forever.
