= Stonegate Elementary School =

Stonegate Elementary School may refer to:

- Stonegate Elementary School - Irvine, California - Irvine Unified School District
- Stonegate Elementary School - West Sacramento, California - Washington Unified School District of Yolo County
- Stonegate Elementary School - Zionsville, Indiana - Zionsville Community Schools
- Stonegate Elementary School - Silver Spring, Maryland - Montgomery County Public Schools
- Stonegate Elementary School - Raymore, Missouri - Raymore-Peculiar R-II School District
- Stonegate Elementary School - Bedford, Texas - Hurst-Euless-Bedford Independent School District
