= Eastern Gate (Delft) =

City gate in Delft, Netherlands

Coordinates: 52°00′40″N 4°22′05″E

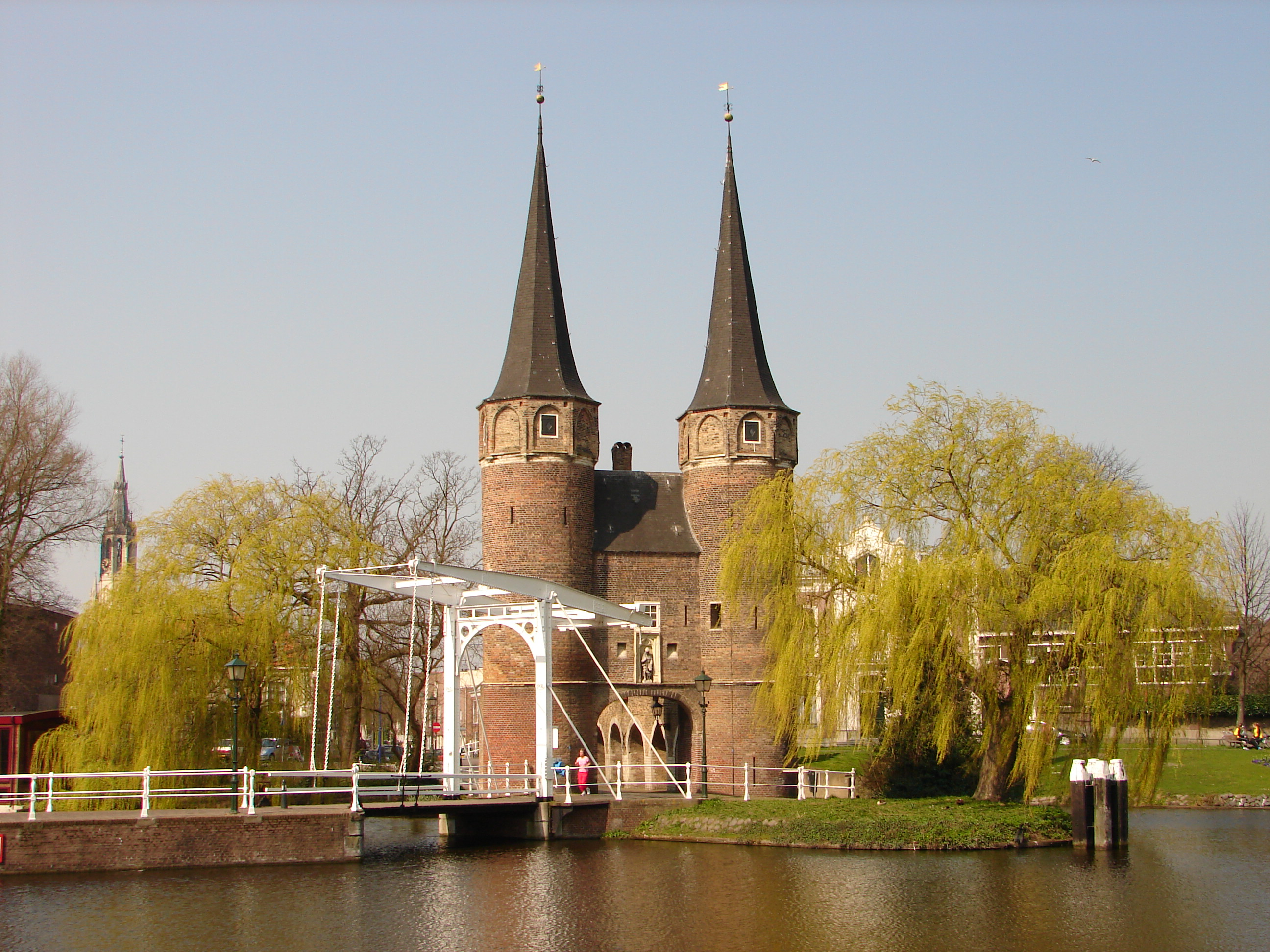
Oostpoort with its drawbridge

The Eastern Gate (Dutch: Oostpoort) in Delft, Netherlands, is an example of Brick Gothic northern European architecture that was built around 1400. Around 1510, the towers were enhanced with an additional octagonal floor and high spires. The gate was restored in 1964. It currently serves as an art gallery and private residence.

This is the only city gate remaining in Delft; the others were demolished in the 1840s. It remained as it had less traffic than the other gates.
