= Two Stone Gates =

Historic stone gates in Hollywood, California, U.S.

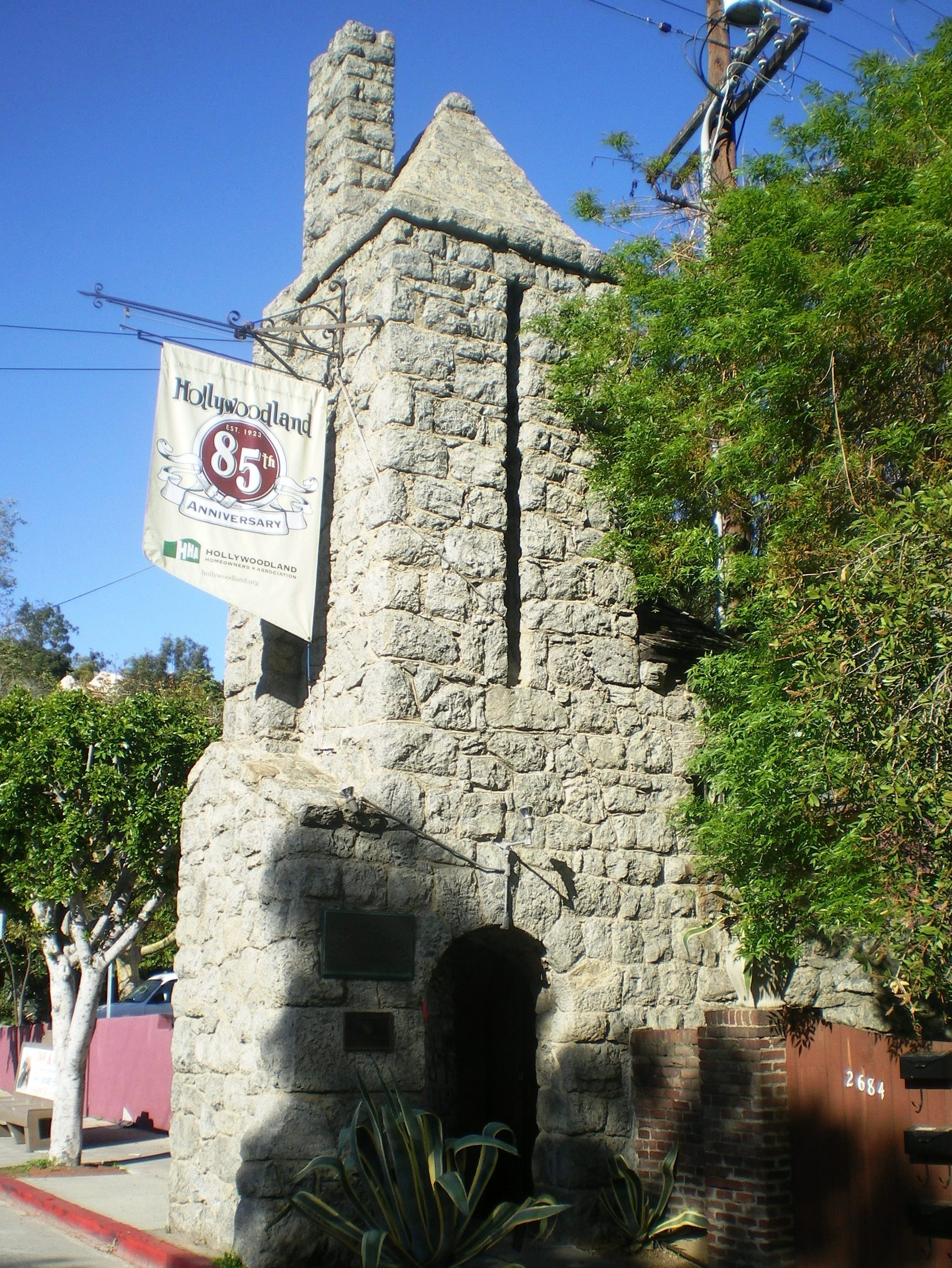
- One of the two gates in 2009

- Location in Los Angeles County
- 34°07′12″N 118°19′15″W
- Location: Intersection of Beachwood Drive, Belden Drive, and Westshire Drive, Hollywood, California

History
- Built: 1923
- Built by: European stonemasons

Site notes
- Architect: unknown
- Architectural style: French Norman

Los Angeles Historic-Cultural Monument
- Designated: May 24, 1963
- Reference no.: 20

Two Stone Gates, also known as Hollywoodland Gates, are historic stone gates located at the intersection of Beachwood Drive, Belden Drive, and Westshire Drive in Hollywood, California. The gates form the entrance to the neighborhood of Hollywoodland, part of Beachwood Canyon, and they were declared Los Angeles Historic-Cultural Monument No. 20 in 1963.

== History ==
Both gates that comprise Two Stone Gates were built by European stonemasons in 1923. The architects are unknown.

The building was declared Los Angeles Historic-Cultural Monument No. 20 on November 23, 1963.

== Architecture and design ==
The gates are designed in the French Norman style and form the entrance to the neighborhood of Hollywoodland in Beachwood Canyon.

== In popular culture ==
The two stone structures at the entrance to the Hollywood Tower Hotel grounds in Disney's Hollywood Studios were inspired by the Two Stone Gates.
