= Stonegate, Fort Worth, Texas =

Neighborhood in the United States

Coordinates: 32.7118°N 97.3807°W

Stonegate is a neighborhood in Fort Worth, Texas near the Texas Christian University campus on a hill overlooking downtown Fort Worth.
