= Cathedral of the Resurrection of Christ =

Cathedral of the Resurrection of Christ, Church of the Resurrection of Christ, or Resurrection of Christ Cathedral may refer to:

- Resurrection of Christ Cathedral, Narva, an Estonian Orthodox Church of Moscow Patriarchate in Narva, Estonia
- Cathedral of the Resurrection of Christ, Podgorica, Montenegro
- Church of Resurrection of Christ, Kumanovo, an Orthodox church building under construction in Kumanovo, North Macedonia
- Church of the Resurrection, Kokshetau, Kazakhstan
- Cathedral of the Resurrection of Christ, Kubinka, Russia
- Church of Resurrection of Christ in Kadashi, a major Naryshkin Baroque church in Moscow, Russia
- Cathedral of the Resurrection of Christ, Kyiv, Ukraine
- Cathedral of the Resurrection of Christ, Ivano-Frankivsk, Ukraine

== See also ==
- Cathedral of the Resurrection (disambiguation)
- Church of the Resurrection (disambiguation)
- Holy Resurrection Church (disambiguation)
