= Sts. Apostles Peter and Paul Church (Brzeg) =

Coordinates: 50.5145°N 17.2821°E

- Kościół Świętych Apostołów Piotra i Pawła
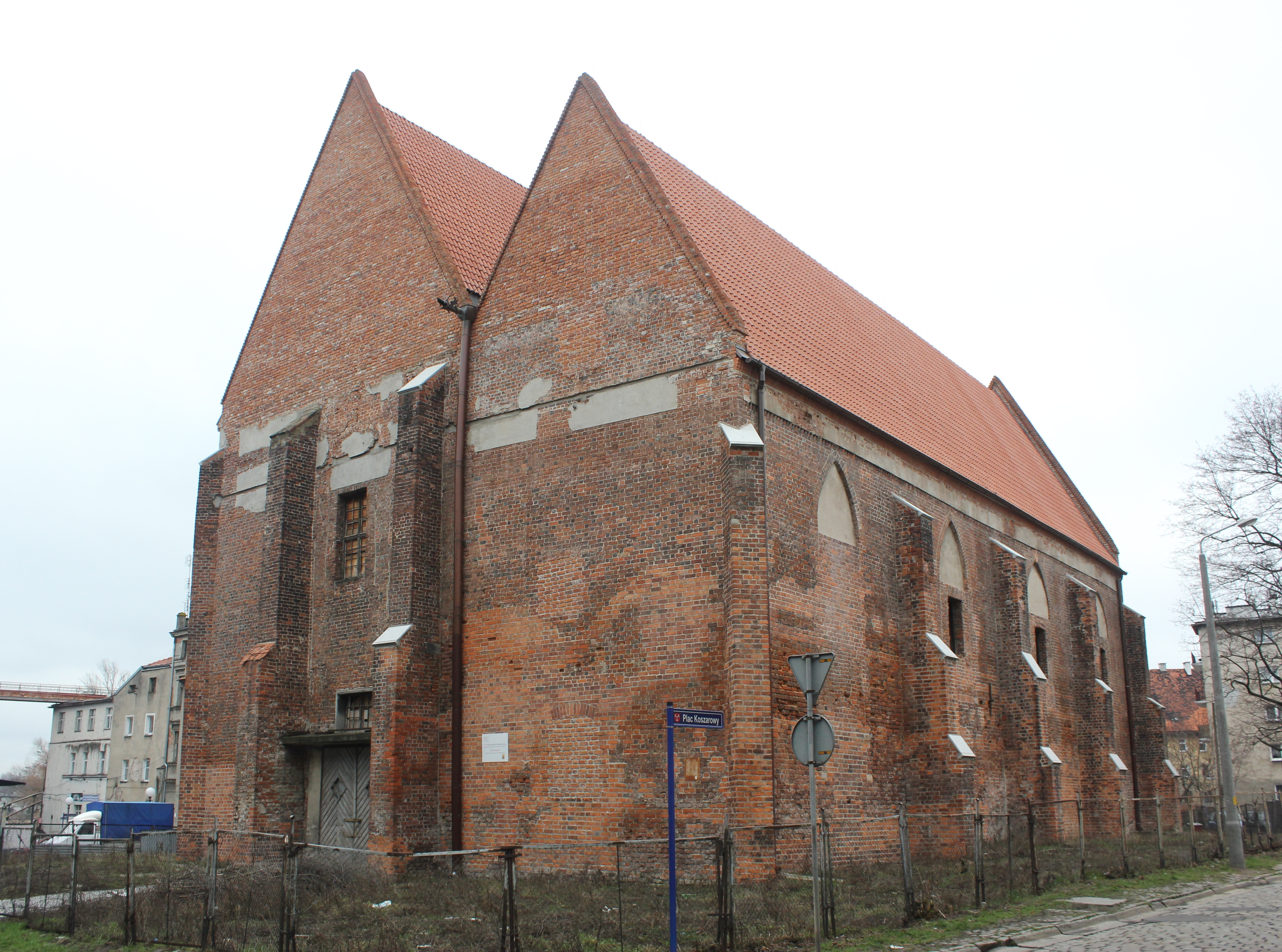
- Western side view
- Sts. Apostles Peter and Paul Church
- Location: Brzeg
- Country: Poland
- Denomination: Roman Catholic

Architecture
- Style: Gothic
- Groundbreaking: 13th century
- Completed: 16th century

Specifications
- Materials: Brick

Administration
- Archdiocese: Roman Catholic Archdiocese of Wrocław

Sts. Apostles Peter and Paul Church in Brzeg, Poland, is a historic Gothic Franciscan basilica built in the thirteenth century.

The church was built in the thirteenth century, subsequently expanded in 1338, and transformed after a fire in the sixteenth century. In 1527, after Frederick II of Legnica introduced Lutheranism into Brzeg, the town's Franciscans were expelled, with the basilica acquired by the town authorities. In 1582, the building was rebuilt into an arsenal. The fire service moved into the building the nineteenth-thirties. After the Great Flood of 1997, the basilica's tower, together with some of its walls collapsed. Since 2001, the basilica has undergone renovation works, with the Roman Catholic Archdiocese of Wrocław acquiring the church in 2003. In 2013, the archdiocese received funds of zl 1,700,000 from the Ministry of Culture and National Heritage of Poland to rebuild the roof and rebuild the basilica's Gothic windows.

== See also ==
- St. Nicholas' Church, Brzeg
- Holy Cross Church, Brzeg
