= Church of the Resurrection =

Church of the Resurrection or Holy Resurrection Church may refer to:

- Church of the Holy Sepulchre, Jerusalem, built on the site believed to be the location of the burial and resurrection of Jesus Christ

== Albania ==
- Holy Resurrection Church, Mborje, cultural Monument in Korçë County
- Resurrection Cathedral, Korçë, an Albanian Orthodox Church
- Resurrection Cathedral, Tirana, an Albanian Orthodox Church

== Japan ==
- Holy Resurrection Cathedral, also known as Nikorai-do, an Orthodox church in Chiyoda ward, Tokyo
- Holy Resurrection Orthodox Church of Hakodate, in Hakodate, Oshima Subprefecture, Hokkaido

== Kazakhstan ==
- Church of the Resurrection, Kokshetau, a Russian Orthodox cathedral in Akmola Region, Kazakhstan

== Latvia ==
- Church of the Resurrection, Riga, a Lutheran Church

== Lithuania ==
- Holy Resurrection Orthodox Church, Kaunas, an Eastern Orthodox church
- Christ's Resurrection Church, Kaunas, a Roman Catholic church

== Macedonia ==
- Church of Resurrection of Christ, Kumanovo, an Orthodox church in North Macedonia that started construction in 2014

== Montenegro ==
- Cathedral of the Resurrection of Christ, Podgorica, a Serbian Orthodox Church cathedral

== Morocco ==
- Russian Orthodox Church in Rabat

== Pakistan ==
- Cathedral Church of the Resurrection, Lahore, an Anglican cathedral

== Poland ==
- Church of the Resurrection, Katowice, an Evangelical–Augsburg church

== Romania ==
- Church of the Resurrection, Sebeș, a Romanian Orthodox church.
- Church of the Resurrection an Anglican Church in Bucharest.

== Russia ==
- Church of the Savior on Blood, St. Petersburg, a former Russian Orthodox church, currently a museum
- Church of the Resurrection, Kadashi, a Russian Orthodox church in Moscow
- Church of the Resurrection, Kostroma, a Russian Orthodox church

== Ukraine ==
- Church of the Resurrection, Chernihiv
- Church of the Resurrection, Foros, a Ukrainian Orthodox church
- Cathedral of the Resurrection of Christ, Kyiv, a Ukrainian Greek Catholic Church

== United Kingdom ==
- Church of the Resurrection and All Saints, Caldy, an Anglican church in Wirral, Merseyside
- Church of the Resurrection, Hurley, also called simply The Resurrection, an Anglican church in Warwickshire, England

== United States ==
- Holy Resurrection Church (Belkofski, Alaska), a Russian Orthodox church
- Holy Resurrection Church (Kodiak, Alaska), a Russian Orthodox church
- Resurrection of the Lord Catholic Church (Waipahu, Hawaii), a Roman Catholic Church on the island of Oahu
- Resurrection Catholic Church, in Dubuque, Iowa
- United Methodist Church of the Resurrection, Leawood, Kansas
- Holy Resurrection Orthodox Church (Berlin, New Hampshire), an Eastern Orthodox Church
- Church of the Resurrection (Wheaton, Illinois), a former Episcopal church now serving as the cathedral of the Anglican Diocese of the Upper Midwest
- Church of the Resurrection (Manhattan), an Episcopal church on 74th Street in Manhattan, New York City
- Chapel of the Resurrection (New York City), a Roman Catholic chapel on 151st Street in Manhattan, New York City
- Church of the Resurrection (Queens), an Episcopal church on 118th Street in Richmond Hill/Kew Gardens, Queens, New York City
- Church of the Resurrection (Rye, New York), a Roman Catholic Church
- Church of the Resurrection (Little Switzerland, North Carolina), an Episcopal church

== Uruguay ==
- Russian Orthodox Church of the Resurrection, Montevideo

== See also ==
- Cathedral of the Resurrection (disambiguation)
- Christ's Resurrection Church (disambiguation)
