= Christ's Resurrection Church, Brzeg =

Coordinates: 50.5121°N 17.2909°E

Christ's Resurrection Church
- Kościół Zmartwychwstania Pańskiego
- Christ's Resurrection Church
- Location: Brzeg
- Country: Poland
- Denomination: Roman Catholic

Architecture
- Style: Baroque
- Completed: 1724

Specifications
- Materials: Brick

Administration
- Parish: Parafia wojskowa Zmartwychwstania Pańskiego w Brzegu

Christ's Resurrection Church is a Roman Catholic garrison church in Brzeg, in the Opole Voivodeship. The church belongs to the deanery of the Polish Land Forces of the Military Ordinariate of Poland.

The church is a former cemetery chapel, whose present building dates back to 1724. In the past, the chapel was named after the Holy Cross. The chapel is in the Baroque architectural style.

== See also ==
- Brzeg Castle
- St. Jadwiga's Church, Brzeg
- St. Nicholas' Church, Brzeg
