= Cathedral of the Resurrection =

Cathedral of the Resurrection or Resurrection Cathedral may refer to:

- Cathedral of the Resurrection, Ikageng, a religious building in Ikageng in Northwest Province, South Africa
- Cathedral Church of the Resurrection, an Anglican cathedral in the heart of Lahore, Pakistan
- Resurrection Cathedral, Korçë, an Albanian Orthodox church in Korçë, Albania
- Resurrection Cathedral, Tirana, an Albanian Orthodox church situated in the center of Tirana, Albania
- Holy Resurrection Cathedral, a cathedral of the Japanese Orthodox Church, in Chiyoda, Tokyo

== See also ==
- Cathedral of the Resurrection of Christ (disambiguation)
- Church of the Resurrection (disambiguation)
- Holy Resurrection Church (disambiguation)
