= Christ's Resurrection Church =

Christ's Resurrection Church may refer to:

- Christ's Resurrection Church, Brzeg, in Brzeg, Poland
- Christ's Resurrection Church, Kaunas, in Kaunas, Lithuania

== See also ==
- Church of the Resurrection (disambiguation)
