= St. Jadwiga's Church, Brzeg =

St. Jadwiga's Church
- Kościół św. Jadwigi w Brzegu
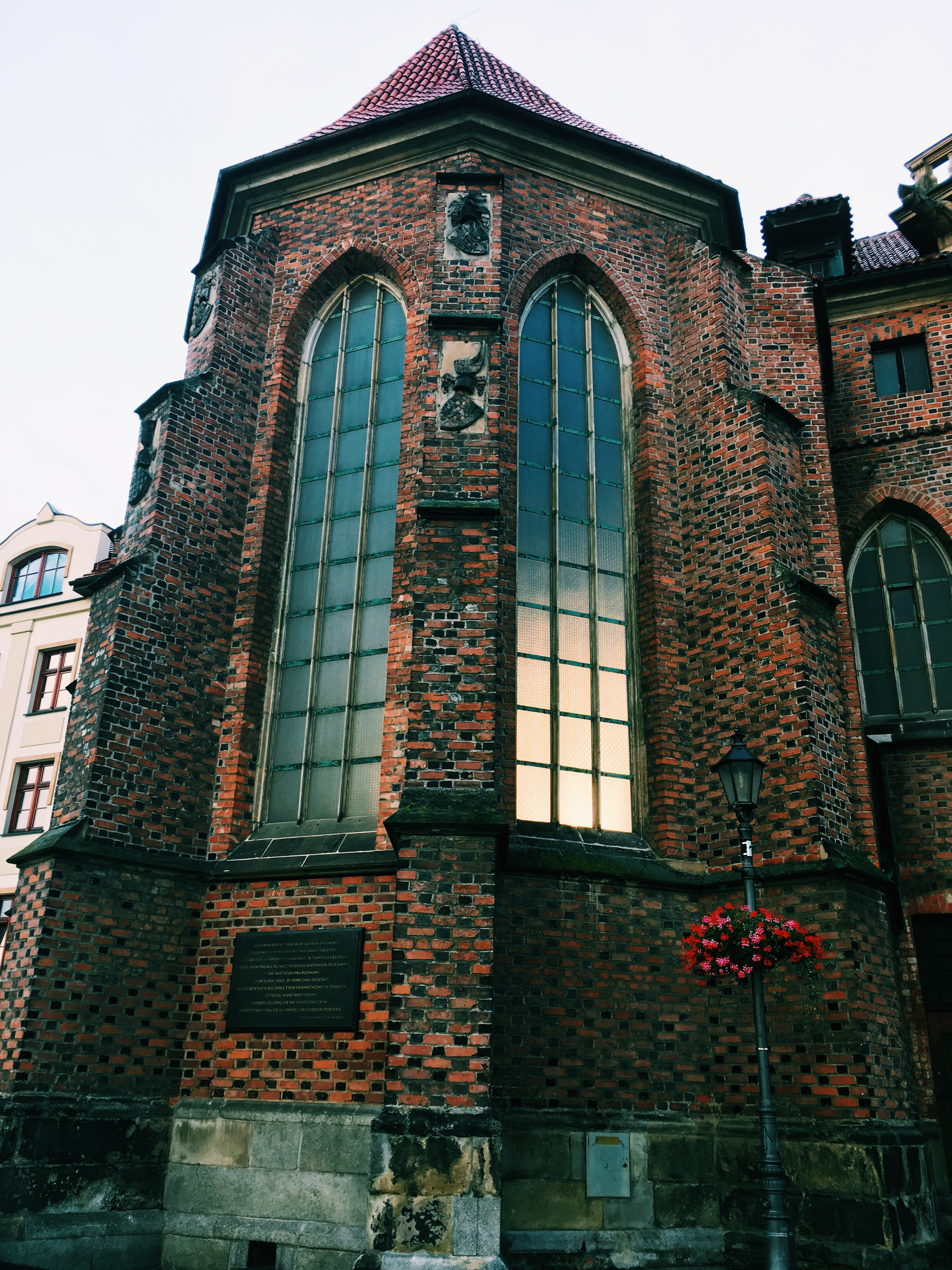
- St. Jadwiga's Church

- 50.5148°N 17.2758°E
- Location: Brzeg
- Country: Poland
- Language: Polish
- Denomination: Roman Catholic

History
- Status: Filial church, castle church
- Founded: 14th century

Architecture
- Functional status: Active
- Heritage designation: Historic Monument of Poland
- Designated: 10 December 2018
- Style: Gothic
- Completed: 14th-16th century

Specifications
- Materials: Brick

Administration
- Archdiocese: Wrocław
- Parish: Exaltation of the Holy Cross Parish in Brzeg

St. Jadwiga's Church in Brzeg, Poland, is a Gothic castle church built in the fourteenth century.

The Gothic brick-built chapel, adjoined to the south-western portion of Brzeg Castle was built in the former location of a collegiate church of St Hedwig built between 1368 and 1369. In 1741, the chapel was destroyed due to Prussian bombardment, with only the presbytery having had survived. After its reconstruction in 1783–1784, the chapel served as the mausoleum for dukes from the Brzeg line of the Piast dynasty (after 1945, 22 sarcophagi were found in the crypt). The chapel suffered damage during World War II, and was reconsecrated as a church in 1989.

Presently, the sarcophagi are located in the adjoined Silesian Piasts Brzeg Castle Museum.

Along with the castle, it is listed as a Historic Monument of Poland.

== See also ==
- Brzeg Castle
- Holy Cross Church, Brzeg
- St. Nicholas' Church, Brzeg
