= Church of the Resurrection, Chernihiv =

Church of the Resurrection
- Воскресенська церква
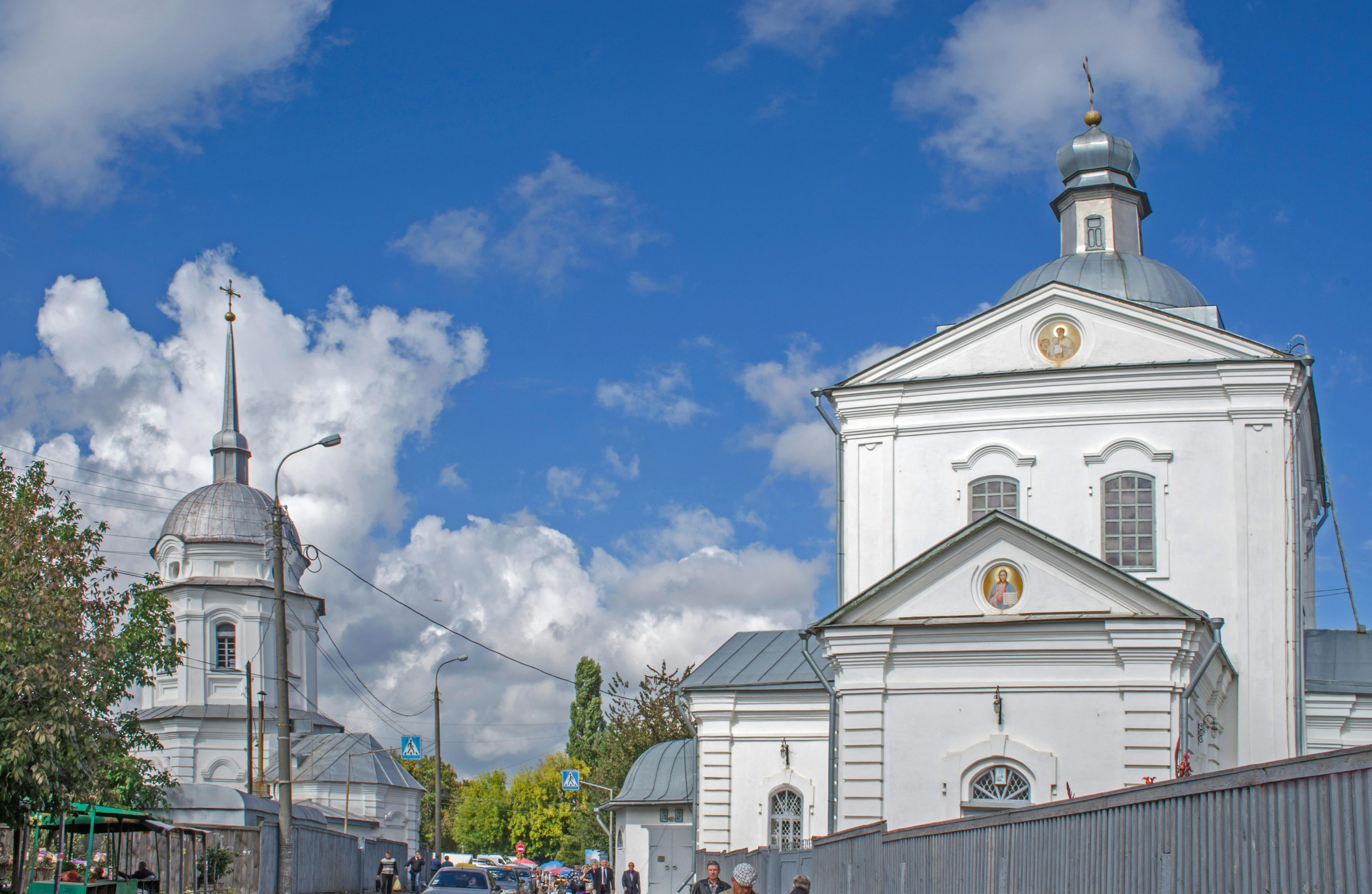
- Church of the Resurrection in Chernihiv
- Church of the Resurrection
- 51°29′36″N 31°17′20″E
- Location: Remisnycha St, 46, Chernihiv, Chernihiv Oblast, Ukraine, 14030
- Country: Ukraine
- Denomination: Eastern Orthodox Church

History
- Status: Chapel

Architecture
- Functional status: Active
- Architectural type: Church
- Style: Late Baroque with Neoclassical elements

Administration
- Archdiocese: Chernihiv

Immovable Monument of National Significance of Ukraine
- Official name: Воскресенська церква та дзвіниця (Resurrection Church and its bell tower)
- Type: Architecture
- Reference no.: 250115

The Church of the Resurrection (Ukrainian: Воскресенська церква) is an Eastern Orthodox Church church in Chernihiv.

== History ==
By the Resolution of the Cabinet of Ministers of the Ukrainian SSR of 08.24.1963 No. 970 "On streamlining the accounting and protection of architectural monuments on the territory of the Ukrainian SSR." No. 822 entitled Resurrection Church and Bell Tower. An information board has been installed.

== Description ==
The church was built in 1772–1775 at the city cemetery on the initiative and at the expense of the landowner Yekaterina Borkovskaya with a detached bell tower, in the lower tier of which the Church of St. Gregory was located. The church was built in the late Baroque style with a noticeable influence of classicism. The church is stone, single-domed, square in plan. Rectangular porches adjoin the central volume on four sides, and a wooden apse on the eastern side. The four-sided facades are completed with triangular pediments.

After the October Revolution, the church was closed, a road was laid through its territory, which divided the church from the bell tower. During World War II, the church was reopened and operated until the 1970s, while being the city's cathedral. The original interior of the temple was destroyed. Services resumed again in the 1990s.

The bell tower of the Resurrection Church was erected in the period 1772–1779 in the late Baroque style with the influence of classicism and at the same time was built in the traditions of wooden architecture of Ukraine. Until 2020 - before the reconstruction of Crafts Street - it was separated from the temple by a street. Stone, plastered, tridyllar, multi-tiered, faceted bell tower. An eight on an eight, crowned with a dome on a low drum with a flashlight and a high sharp spire. There are window openings in the upper octagon. In form and decoration, it resembles the buildings of the architect I.G. Grigorovich-Barsky. Preserved in its original form.

== Gallery ==
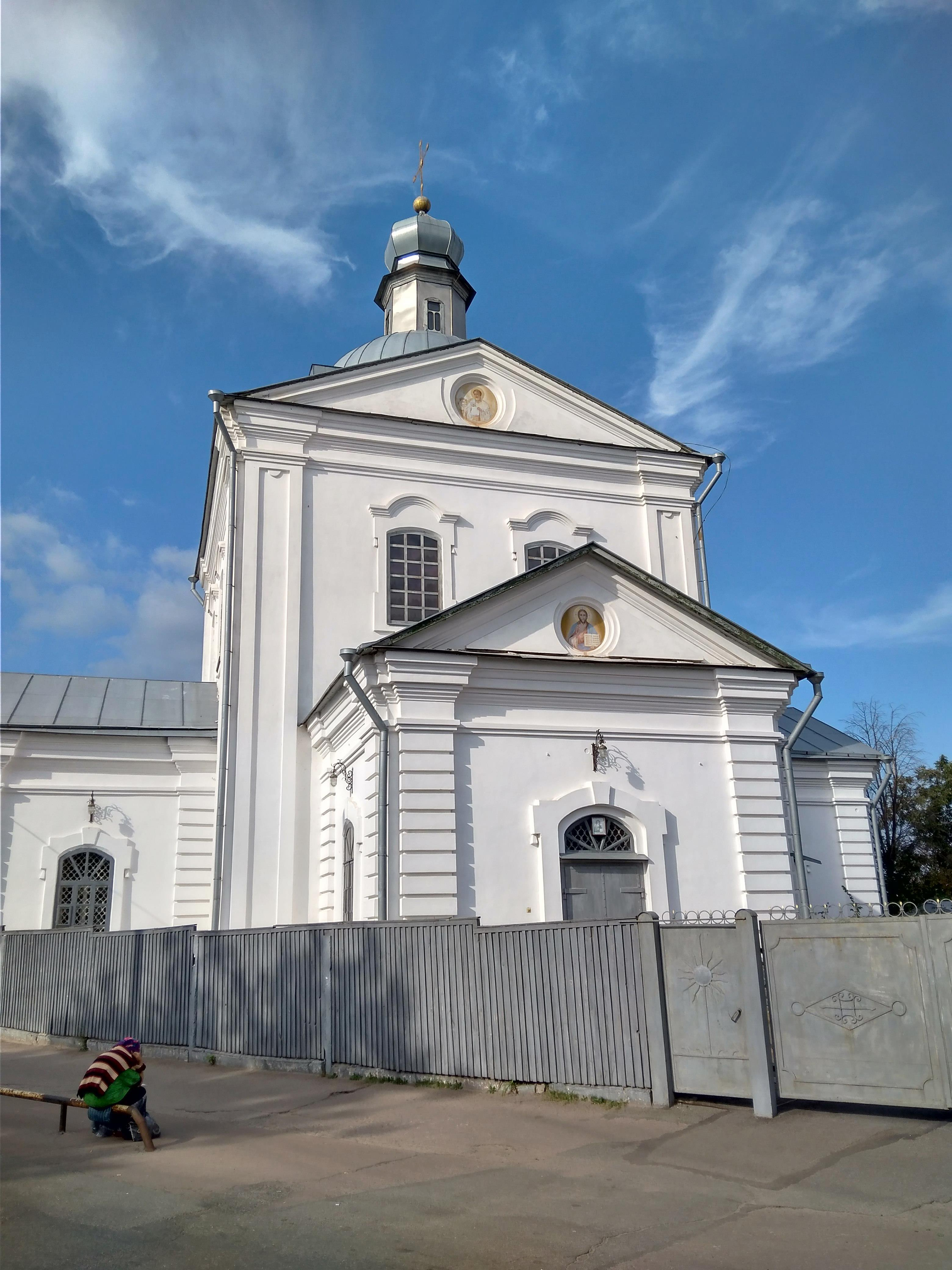

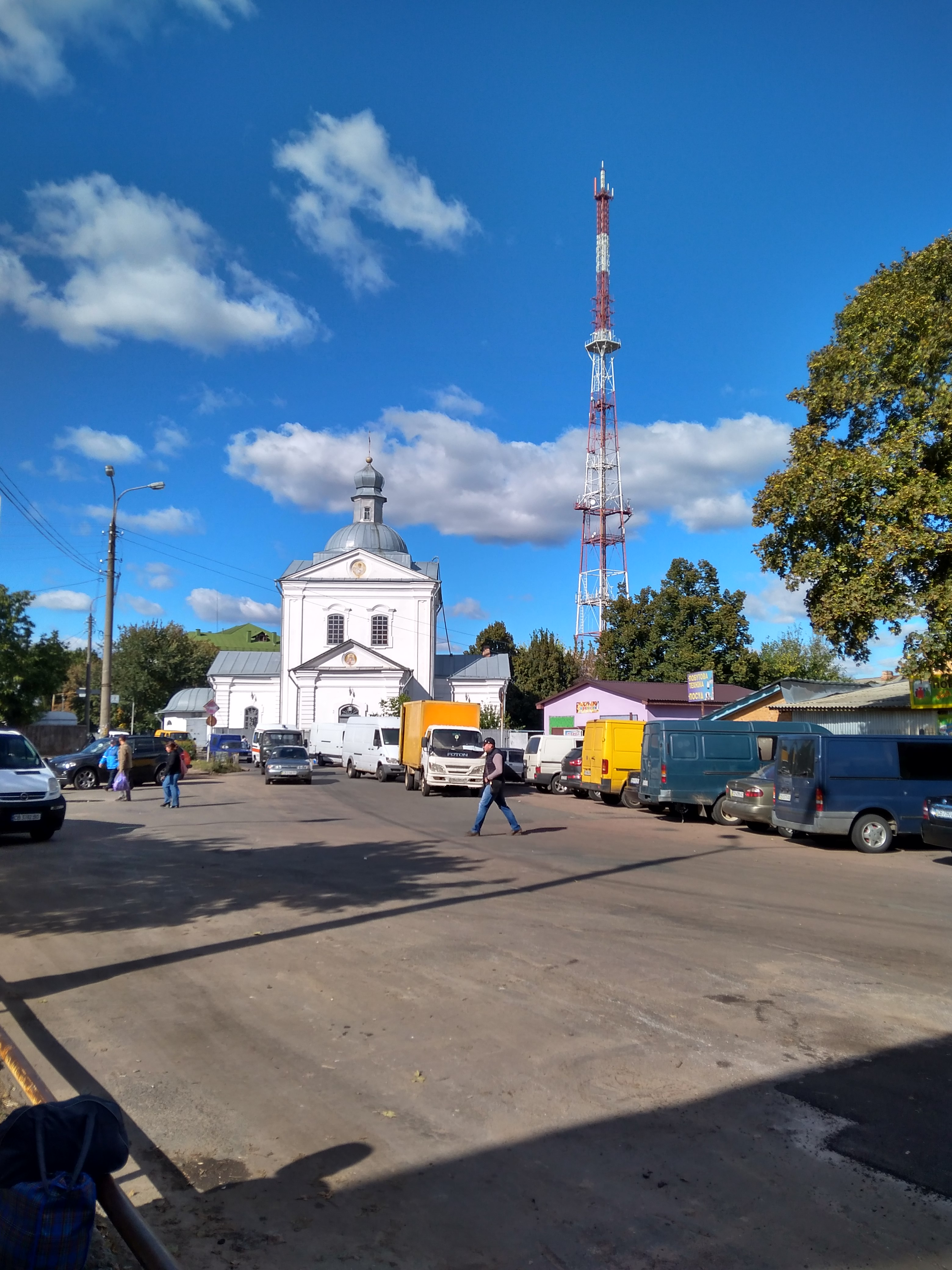

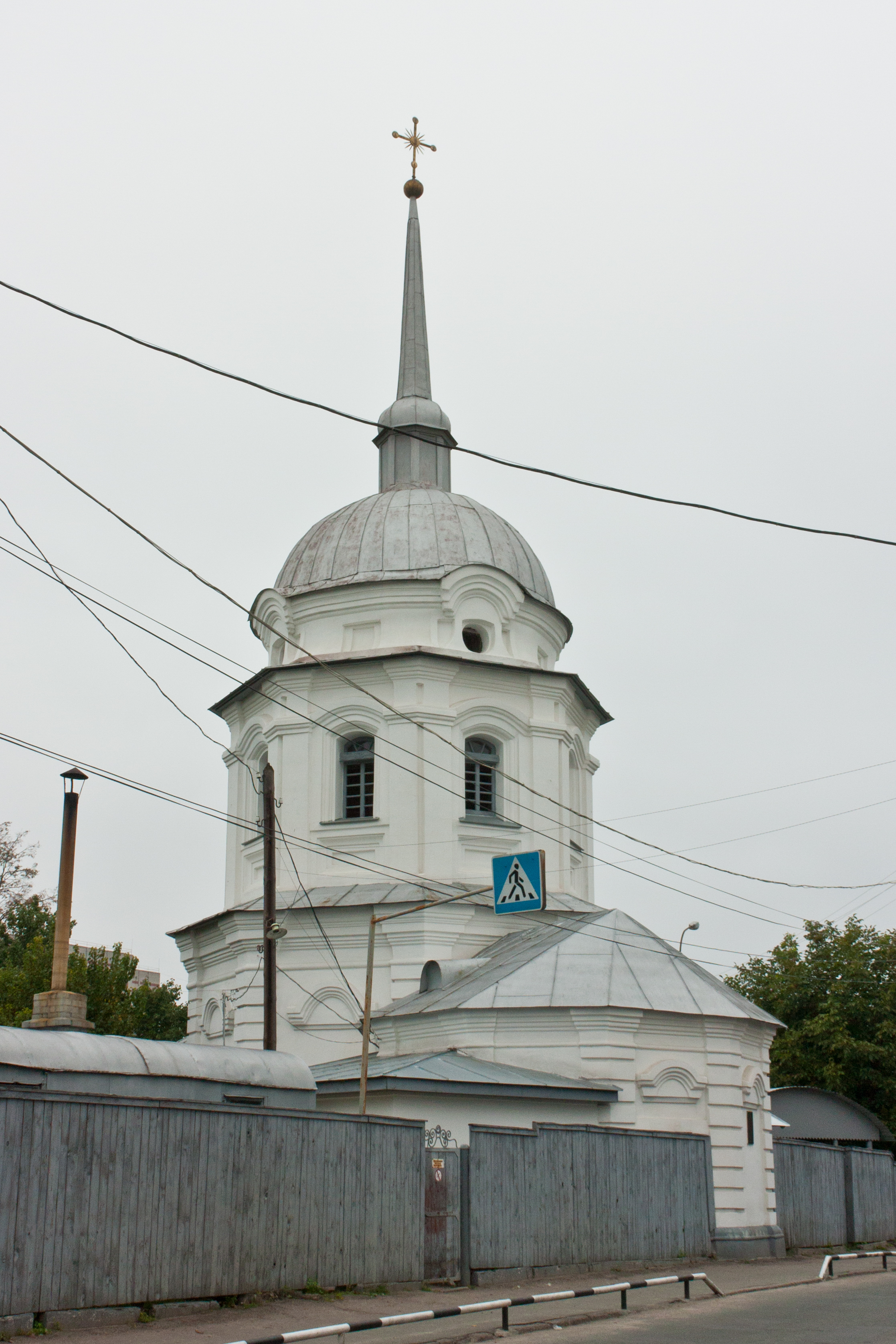

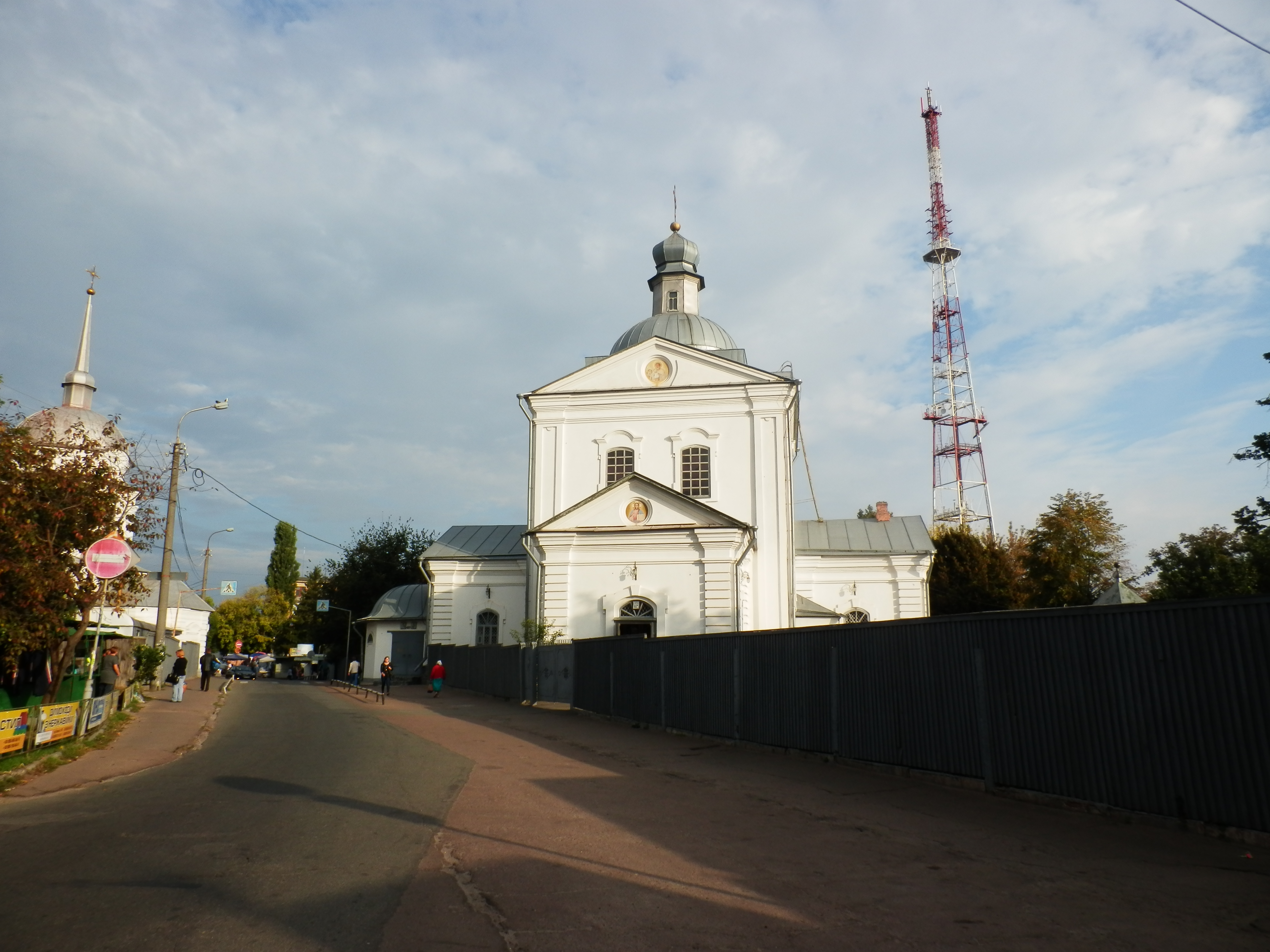

== See also ==
- List of Churches and Monasteries in Chernihiv
- List of the Church of the Resurrection

== Links ==
- wikimapia.org
