= Holy Cross Church, Brzeg =

Coordinates: 50.8633°N 17.4672°E

Holy Cross Church
- Kościół Podwyższenia Krzyża Świętego
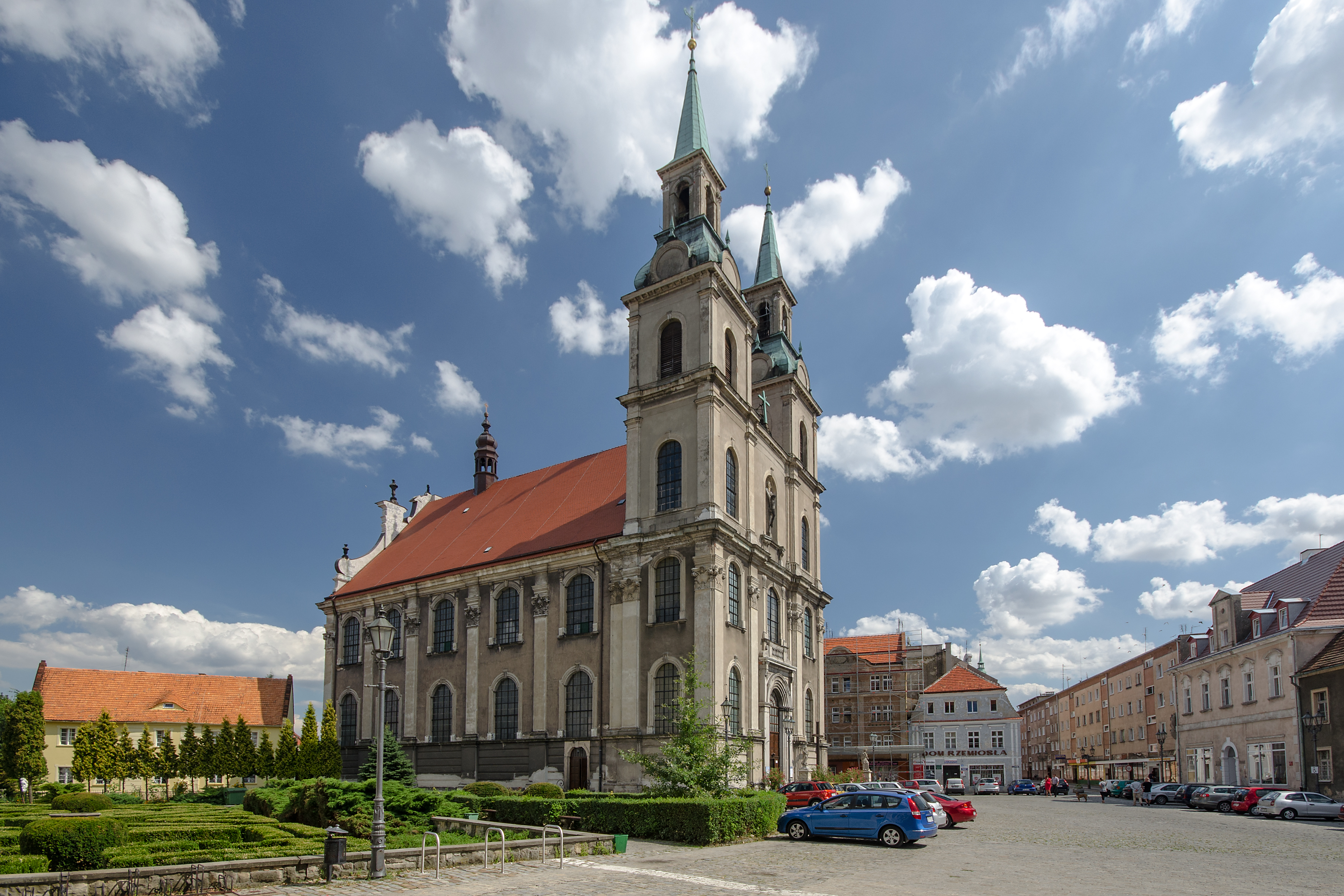
- Holy Cross Church
- Holy Cross Church
- Location: Brzeg
- Country: Poland
- Denomination: Roman Catholic

Architecture
- Architect: J. Frisch
- Style: Baroque
- Groundbreaking: 1734
- Completed: 1739

Specifications
- Materials: Brick

Administration
- Parish: Parafia Podwyższenia Krzyża Świętego w Brzegu

Holy Cross Church - a Roman Catholic parish church in Brzeg, in the Opole Voivodeship. The church belongs to the deanery of the North of Brzeg; Roman Catholic Archdiocese of Wrocław.

== History and architecture ==
The church was built between 1734 and 1739 (the towers were built in between 1854 and 1856) in the location of the destroyed in 1545 monastery of the Dominicans - for the need of Jesuits which arrived to the town in 1677 (architect J. Frisch). The church has a single-aisle, with a number of side chapels and the tribunes. The ceiling stands out due to frescoes of Silesian painter Johann Kuben (1739-1745), presenting the glory of the Holy Cross (in the centre), surrounded by eight scenes of missions of the Jesuit Order and their saints.

== Gallery ==
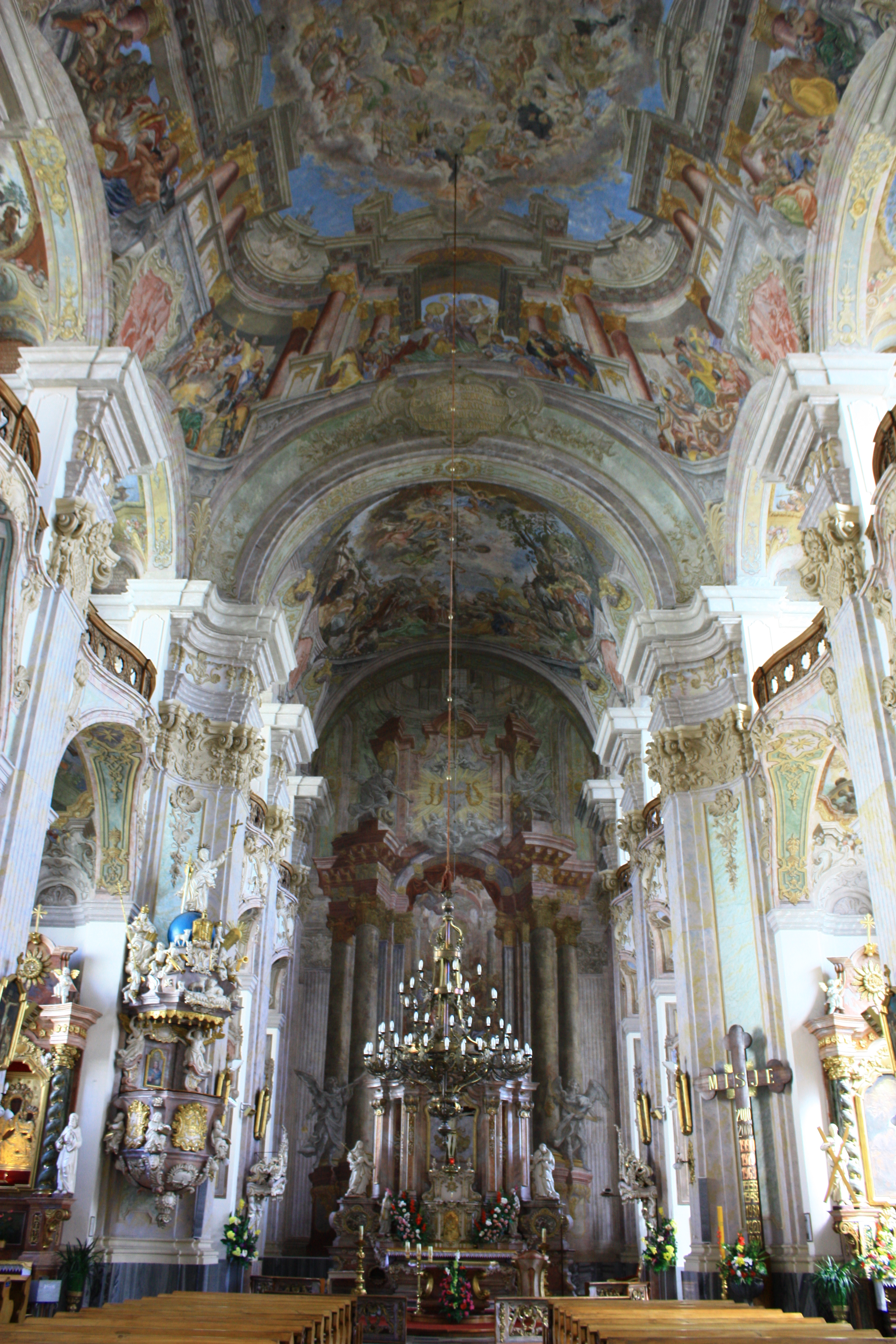
Holy altar

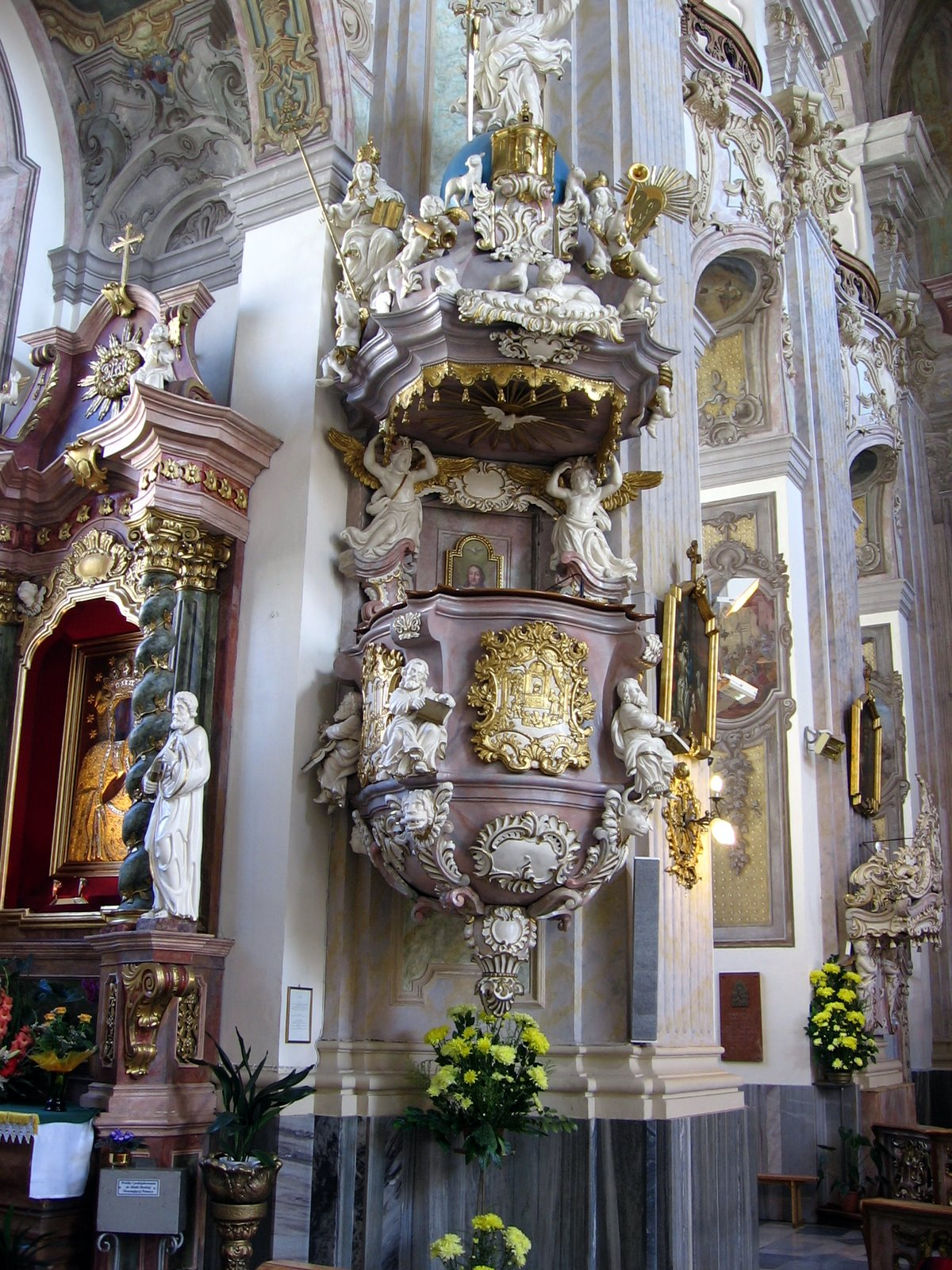
Pulpit

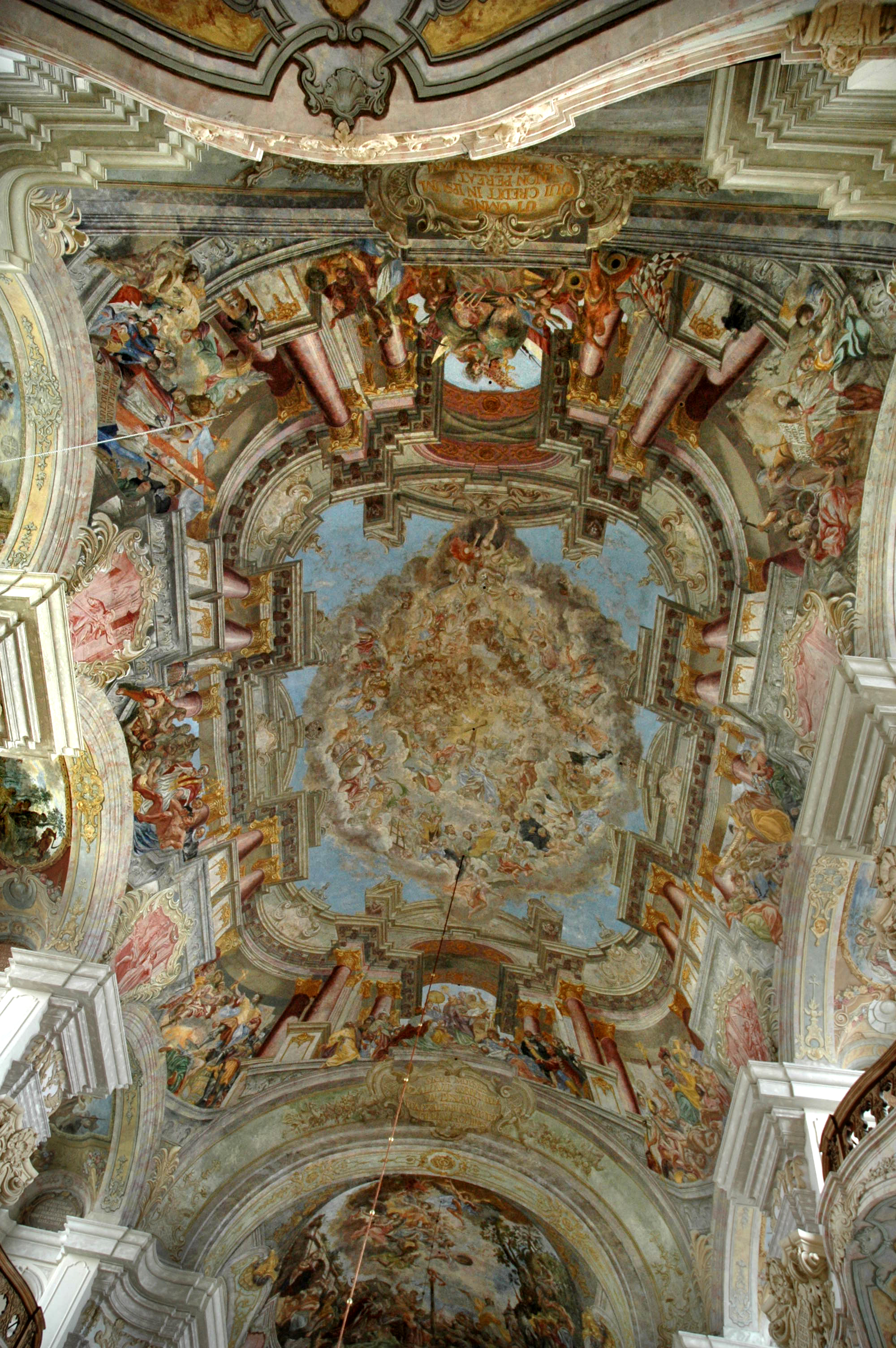
Ceiling

== See also ==
- Brzeg Castle
- St. Jadwiga's Church, Brzeg
- St. Nicholas' Church, Brzeg
