= Holy Resurrection Church =

Holy Resurrection Church may refer to:

- Holy Resurrection Church (Kodiak, Alaska), a Russian Orthodox church located in Kodiak, Alaska, USA
- Holy Resurrection Church (Belkofski, Alaska), a historic Russian Orthodox church, in Belkofski, Alaska, USA
- Holy Resurrection Church, Mborje, a Cultural Monument of Albania, in Mborje, Korçë County

== See also ==
- Church of the Resurrection (disambiguation)
- Holy Resurrection Cathedral
