= Chapel of the Resurrection (New York City) =

Church in Manhattan, New York

Coordinates: 40°49′33″N 73°56′17″W

The Chapel of the Resurrection
- Interactive map of the The Chapel of the Resurrection area

General information
- Location: New York, New York, United States of America
- Client: Roman Catholic Archdiocese of New York

The Chapel of the Resurrection is a Roman Catholic chapel in the Roman Catholic Archdiocese of New York, located at 276 West 151st Street, Manhattan, New York City, United States.

The Church of the Resurrection was founded in 1907 to serve Catholic residents of Central Harlem. This parish was consolidated with the Church of St. Charles Borromeo. and the church building at Resurrection became a chapel of the now larger parish, now called St. Charles Borromeo / Resurrection Chapel.
