= Church of the Resurrection, Riga =

Church building in Riga, Latvia

Church of the Resurrection
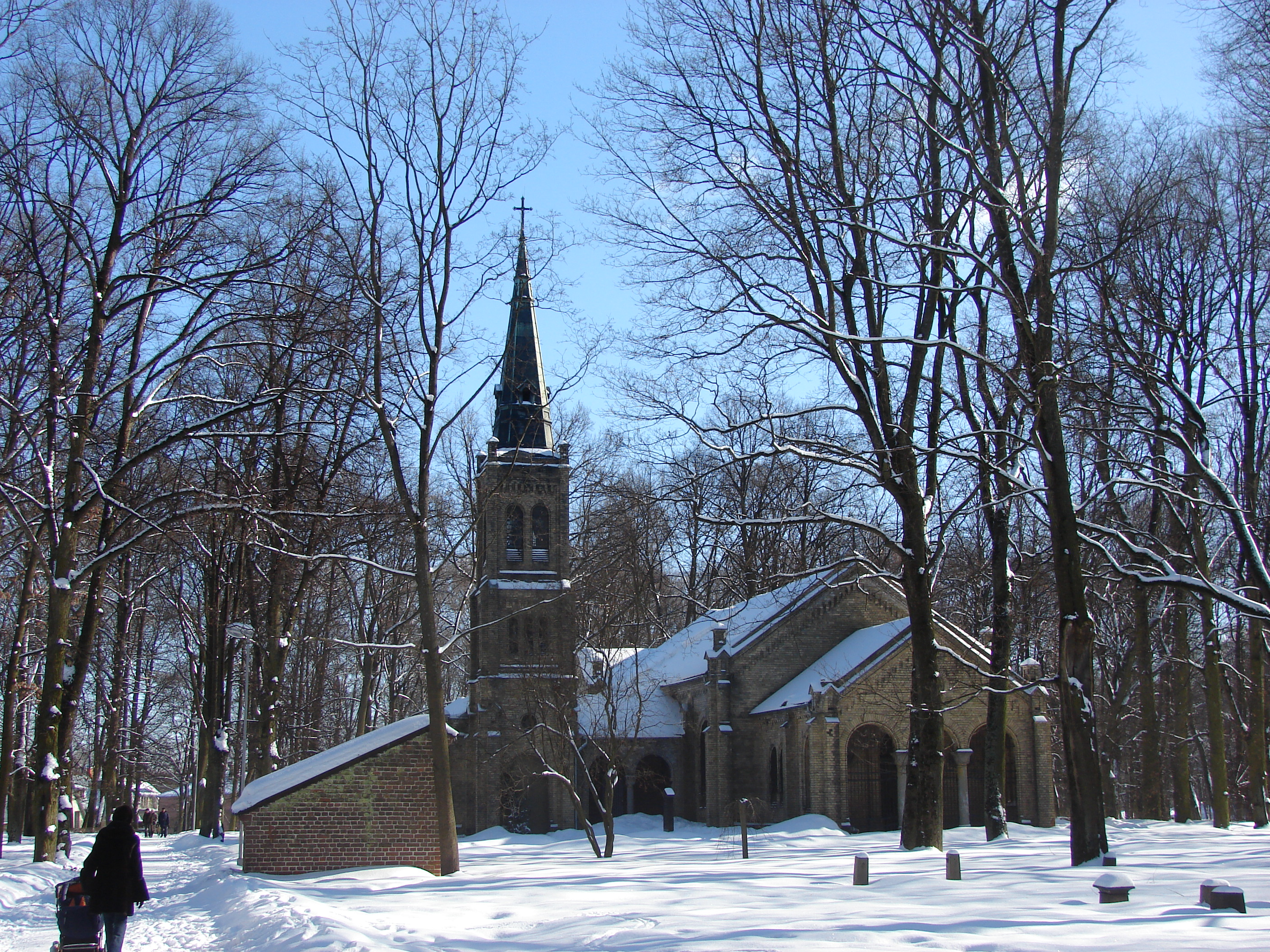

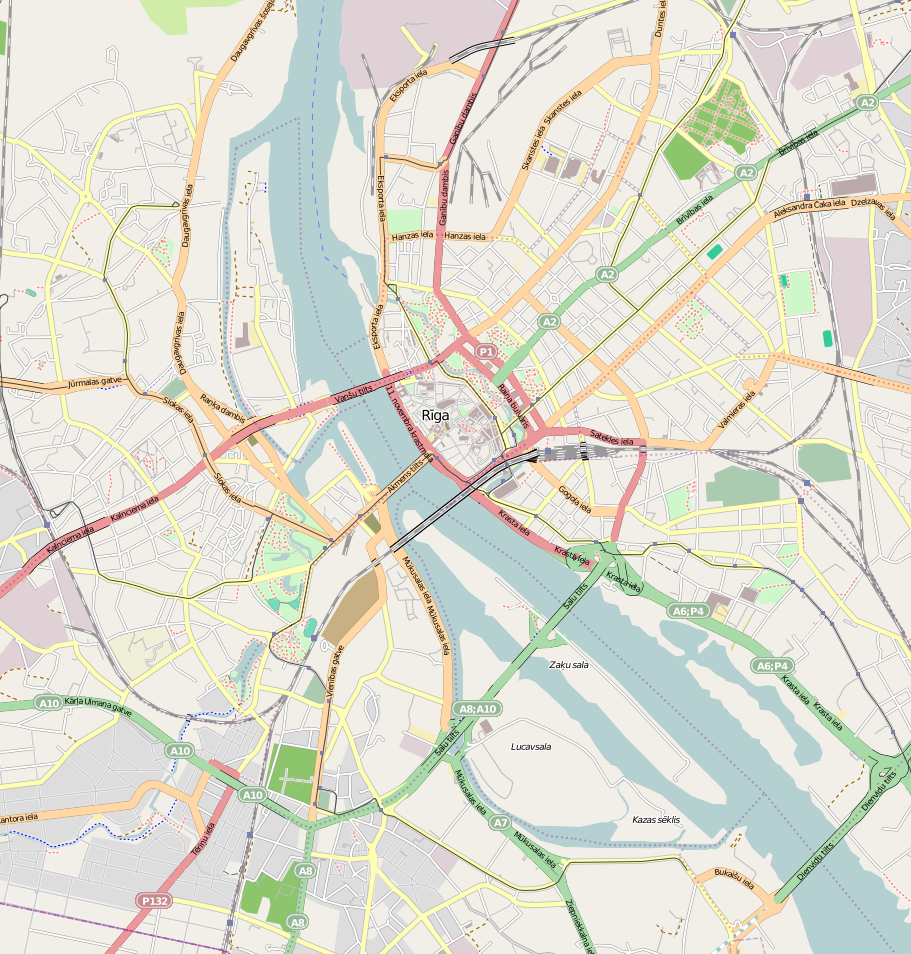
- Location within Riga
- 56°58′18.79″N 24°8′45.56″E
- Location: Riga
- Country: Latvia
- Denomination: Lutheran

Church of the Resurrection (Latvian: Augšāmcelšanās evaņģēliski luteriskā baznīca) is a Lutheran church in Riga, the capital of Latvia. It is a parish church of the Evangelical Lutheran Church of Latvia. The church is situated at the address 4 Klusā Street.

From 1890 to 1891, the New Chapel of the Great Cemetery was built according to the design of the architect Kārlis Neiburgers; the construction was supervised by the architect Kārlis Felsko and the engineer F. Engelsons. This was the fourth chapel to be built here. The previous one was built between 1859 and 1861 to a design by Johann Daniel Felsko.

The chapel was destroyed in the 1960s. In 1989, it was decided to found a repressed Evangelical Lutheran congregation - the first newly founded Lutheran congregation in Latvia after the Second World War. The New Chapel was given to the congregation. Afterwards, reconstruction works were carried out on the church, which ended in 2000 when it was consecrated as Riga Resurrection Evangelical Lutheran Church.
