= Holy Resurrection Orthodox Church, Kaunas =

Eastern Orthodox Church in Lithuania

Coordinates: 54°53′27″N 23°55′37″E

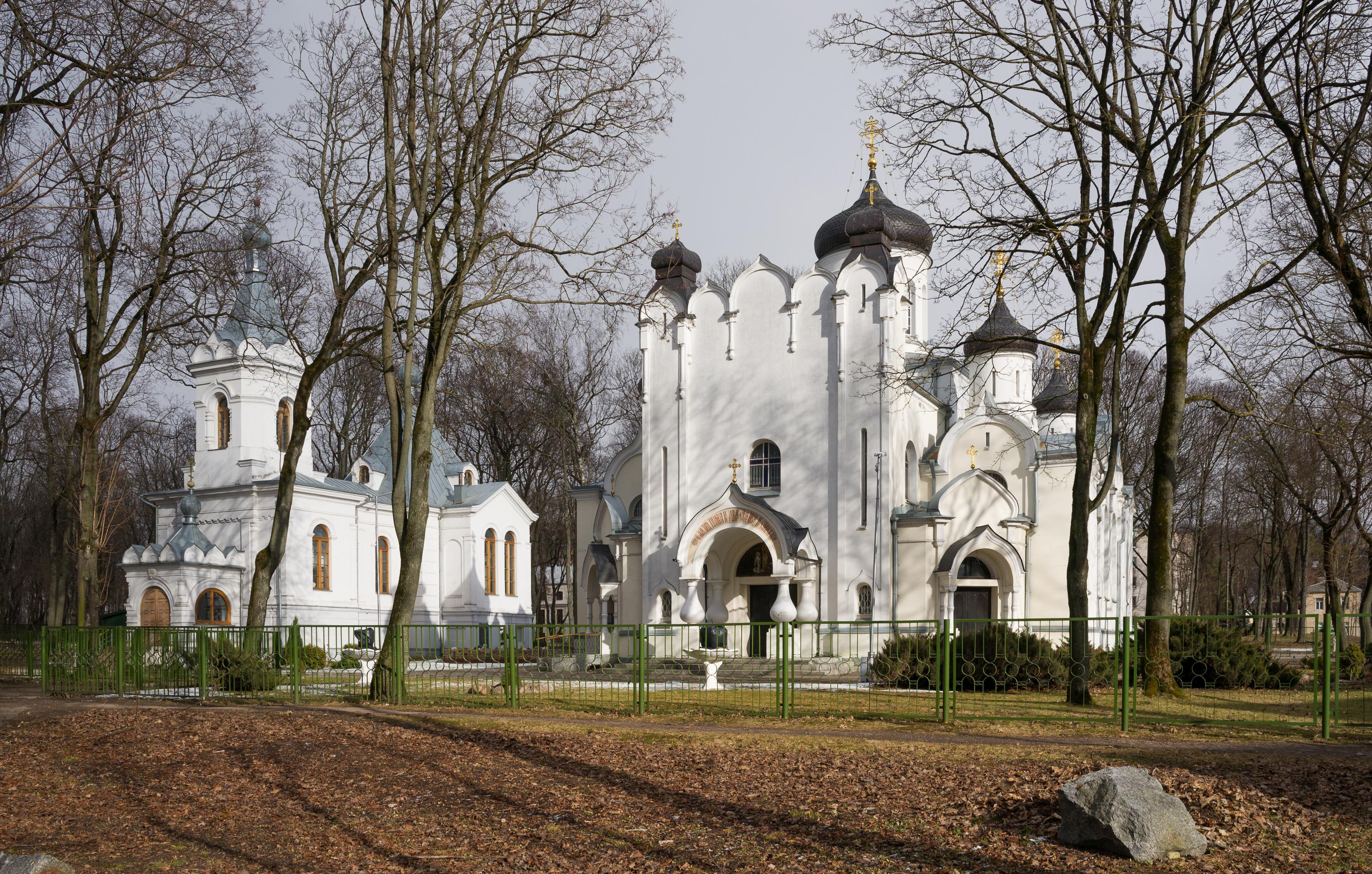
The Holy Resurrection Church in 2017

The Holy Resurrection Church is an Eastern Orthodox church in Kaunas, Lithuania, built in 1862 in the area of the local Orthodox cemetery and belonging to the Russian Orthodox Diocese of Lithuania.

Initially the church belonged to St. Alexander Nevsky parish, but in 1882, due to the constant growth of the number of Orthodox Russians living in the city, it was made a parish church as well. From 1884 on, the church ran a parish school. The church was closed after the Germans entered to Kaunas during World War I. As soon as Lithuania regained independence, the new government confiscated all the Orthodox churches in Kaunas, regarding them as signs of intensive Russification, leaving only the smallest one - the Holy Resurrection Church - in the hands of the Russian Orthodox Church. In 1923 the church was renovated and reconsecrated by the Lithuanian Orthodox metropolitan Elevferiy (Bogojavlensky). At the same time, the church was elevated to the rank of the cathedral of Vilnius and all Lithuania Orthodox diocese, despite its small dimensions. This decision was influenced by the territorial disputes over Vilnius Region with the Second Polish Republic. Although Metropolitan Elevferiy was forced to move to Kaunas, the name of the diocese was never changed.

The metropolitan soon realised that the small church could not serve as the cathedral and wanted to enlarge it. He set up a special commission that was to choose the best project of this transformation. However, in 1930 the idea was abandoned, because the local government agreed to support financially the construction of a new Orthodox cathedral. The Annunciation Cathedral was therefore built between 1932 and 1935, in the neighbourhood of the Holy Resurrection Church. Right after its consecration this church lost the cathedral status and was transformed into an auxiliary church, with services held only during the major feasts.

In 1947 the Soviet government agreed to open the church, which was to function just like before the war. Then in 1957 the building was renovated. However, only four years later the local government decided that the Annunciation parish did not need two churches and turned the Holy Resurrection church into an office. All the original church equipment was transferred to the cathedral. In 2000, the church was given back to the Orthodox diocese, but it is still closed, with only one icon kept inside to stress the sacral character of the place.

== Sources ==
- G. Shlevis, Православные храмы Литвы, Свято-Духов Монастыр, Vilnius 2006, ISBN 9986-559-62-6
