= Cathedral of the Resurrection of Christ, Ivano-Frankivsk =

Cathedral of the Resurrection of Christ
- Собор Святого Воскресіння
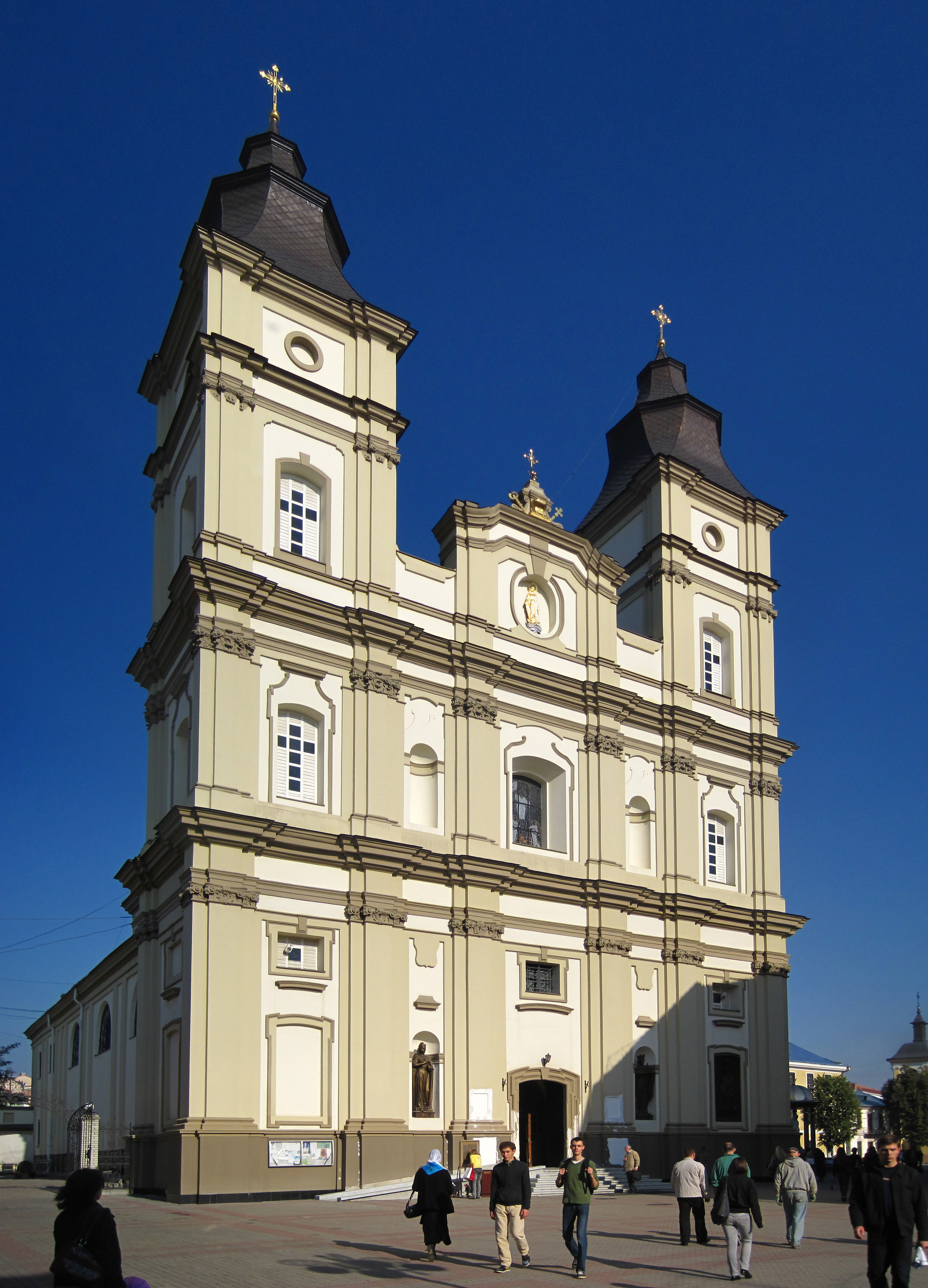
- Cathedral of the Resurrection of Christ
- 48.9260°N 24.7056°E
- Location: Ivano-Frankivsk
- Country: Ukraine
- Denomination: Catholic church (Ukrainian Greek Catholic Church)

Immovable Monument of National Significance of Ukraine
- Official name: Костьол єзуїтів (Jesuite Church)
- Type: Architecture
- Reference no.: 090041

The Cathedral of the Resurrection of Christ or of Our Saviour (Ukrainian: Собор Святого Воскресіння), also called the Ivano-Frankivsk Jesuit Church, is an historic religious building in the city of Ivano-Frankivsk in western Ukraine which functions as a Catholic cathedral and seat of the Ivano-Frankivsk Eparchy (Archieparchia Stanislaopolitanus) using the Byzantine or Ukrainian rite (Greek Catholic) in full communion with the Pope in Rome.

The original church on the site was built for the Jesuits between 1720 and 1729, but this structure was demolished as a result of technical errors. The present Baroque church was built between 1752 and 1761 by the ruler of the city, the governor of Poznan and Kiev Stanisław Potocki. Since 1885 it has been a Greek Catholic cathedral. It stands next to an old monastery.

The church has three naves and a west front with two towers. It is under the pastoral responsibility of Archbishop Volodymyr Viytyshyn who was ratified by Pope Benedict XVI in 2005.

== See also ==
- Catholicism in Ukraine
- Resurrection of Christ

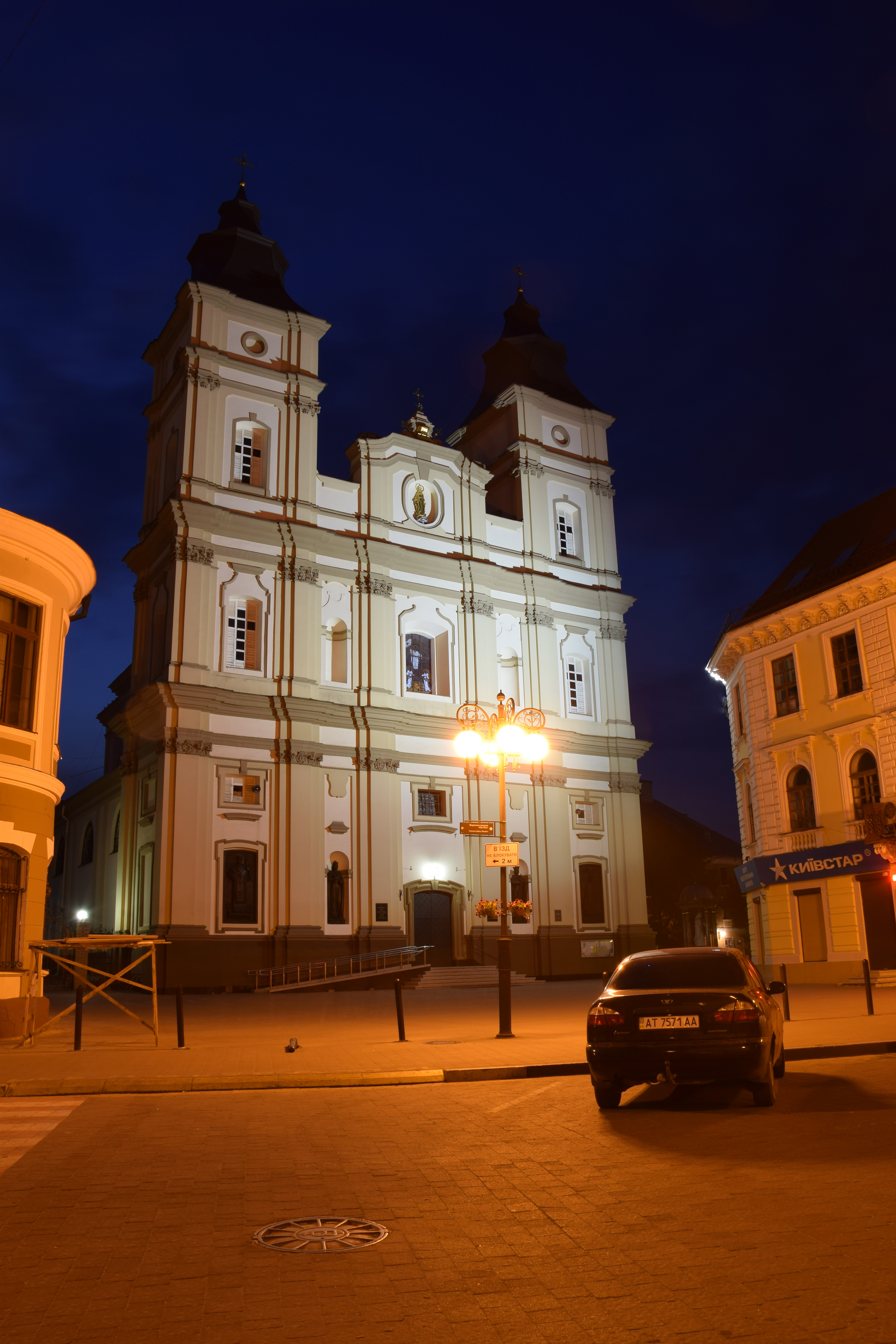
Night view
