= Church of the Resurrection, Sebeș =

Heritage site in Alba County, Romania

Coordinates: 45°57′33″N 23°33′39″E

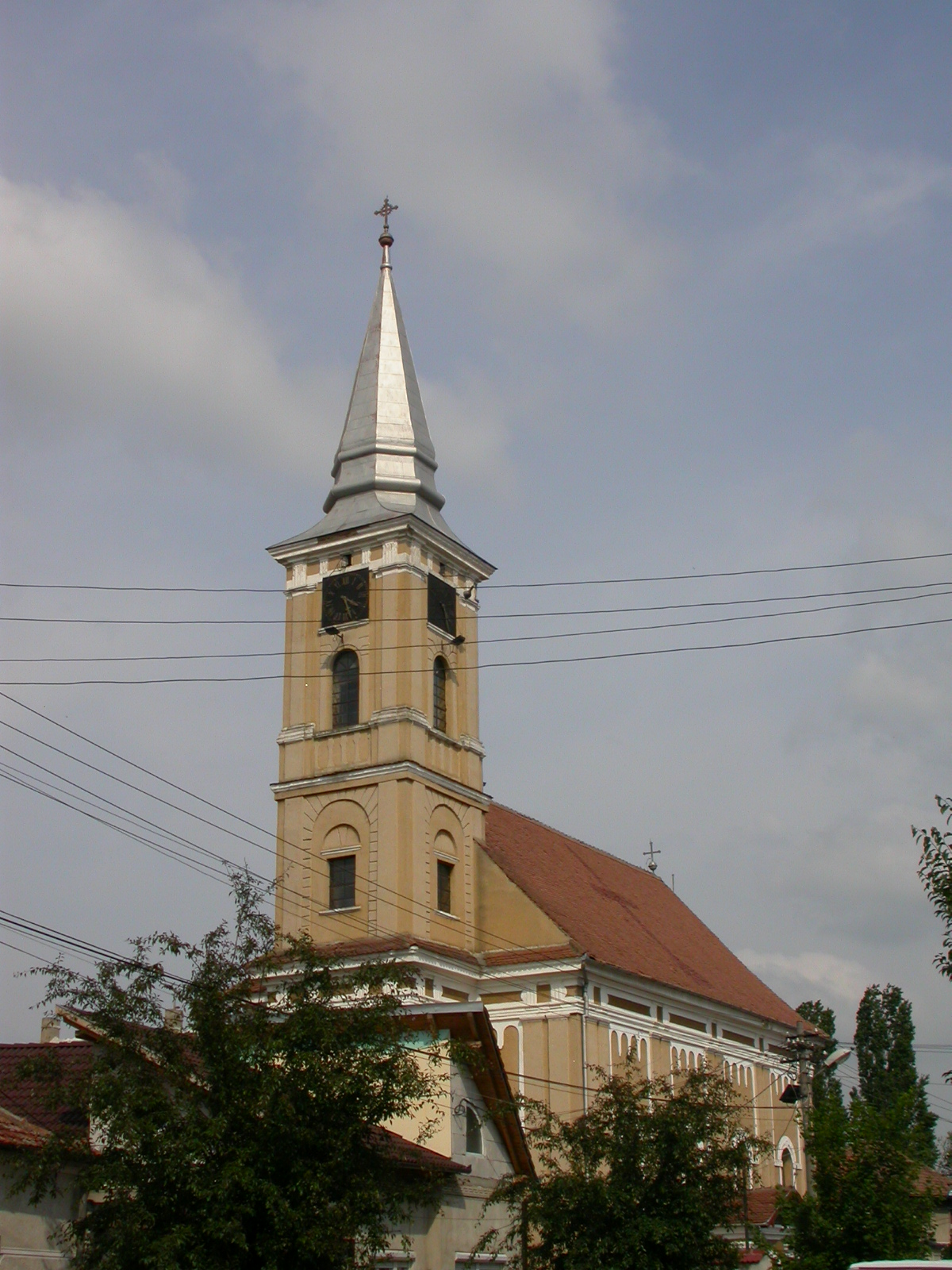
Church of the Resurrection

The Church of the Resurrection (Romanian: Biserica Învierea Domnului) is a Romanian Orthodox church located at 4 Augustin Bena Street, Sebeș, Romania, is dedicated to the Feast of the Resurrection.

Located on the left bank of the Sebeș River, the church was built by the local Orthodox community as its population increased in the early 19th century. Funding came from parishioners, aided by the efforts of Archpriest Zaharie Moga and his brother, Bishop Vasile Moga. The cornerstone was laid in 1819 and continued with difficulty until 1824. At that point, the structure was largely complete, but the spire was not yet covered with brass sheeting, the iconostasis was not painted, there were no doors or windows. By 1827, these deficiencies had been overcome. The church was consecrated the following year, with Bishop Moga participating in it.

The church is listed as a historic monument by Romania's Ministry of Culture and Religious Affairs.
