= St. Nicholas' Church, Brzeg =

Coordinates: 50.8600°N 17.4708°E

St. Nicholas' Church
- Kościół św. Mikołaja
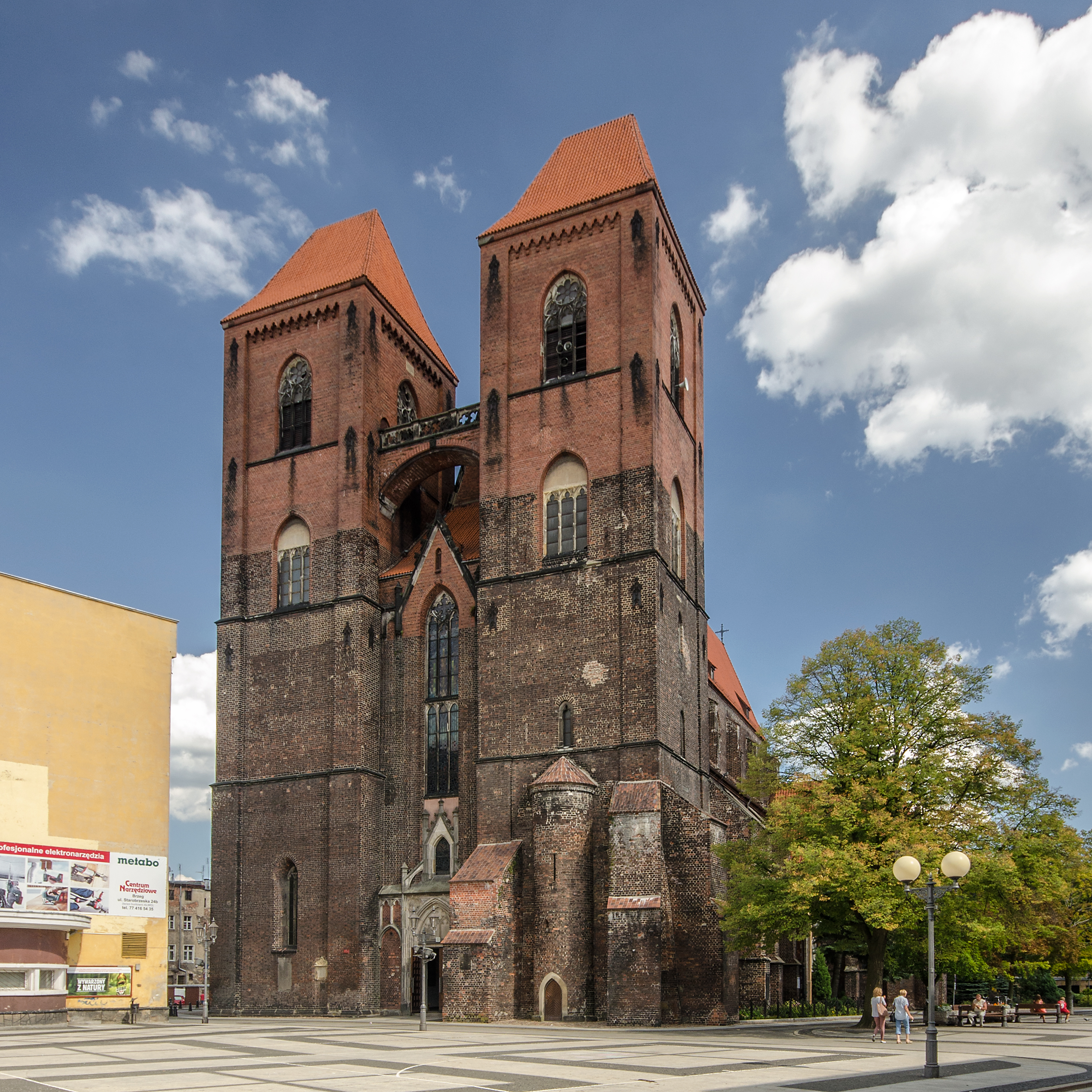
- St. Nicholas' Church
- St. Nicholas' Church
- Location: Brzeg
- Country: Poland
- Denomination: Roman Catholic

Architecture
- Style: Gothic
- Completed: 1370-1420

Specifications
- Materials: Brick

Administration
- Parish: Parafia św. Mikołaja w Brzegu

St. Nicholas' Church in Brzeg, Poland, is a Gothic basilica built in the fourteenth century.

The church was built between 1370 and 1420 during the reign of Louis I of Brzeg. He built it on the site of a former brick building, mentioned in sources from 1279. The building was financed by the town's inhabitants and the prince. The town's noblemen commissioned the project to Wrocław's Master Gunther who had planned the city's churches of St. Mary Magdalene and St. Elizabeth.

== Building of the church ==
The church takes the form of a three-aisled basilica with an elongated nave including a division for choir and lateral aisles leading to the main altar. The naves have vaults which are wide and dark. The main nave is separated from the side by pillars and simple linear spans, with much interior space. The church has fine decorations carved in wood and stained glass windows. To date, only fragments survive of the original wooden decorations. The woodwork was burnt during the Second World War; the remains can be found in the National Museum in Wrocław and in the Museum of the Silesian Piasts in Brzeg. Two of the original stained glass windows are located in the National Museum in Poznań.

== History of the church ==
In 1523, the Reformation reached the town of Brzeg. Prince Frederick II introduced the Lutheran religion into the principality. In 1524, the former Franciscan friar Jan of Opava gave his first sermon in the church in the reformist spirit; having gained ducal support, the teachings of Martin Luther were quick to find recognition among most of the people. In 1525, the church of St. Nicholas began to function as a Protestant church, continuing this role until 1945. The walls and pillars of the church are of stone. It has wooden epitaphs of the rich citizens of Brzeg. At the end of the nineteenth century the church towers were extended in response to the heightening of towers in the Holy Cross Church.

After the church burned down in late January and February 1945, it was left in disrepair for 13 years (until 1958). In 1958, on the initiative of Father Kazimierz Makarska, it was rebuilt on the basis of the plans from 1370. During the renovation work, late Gothic wall frescoes were discovered in the sacristy.

Currently, the church functions as a Roman Catholic church. It is one of the largest Gothic basilicas in Silesia.

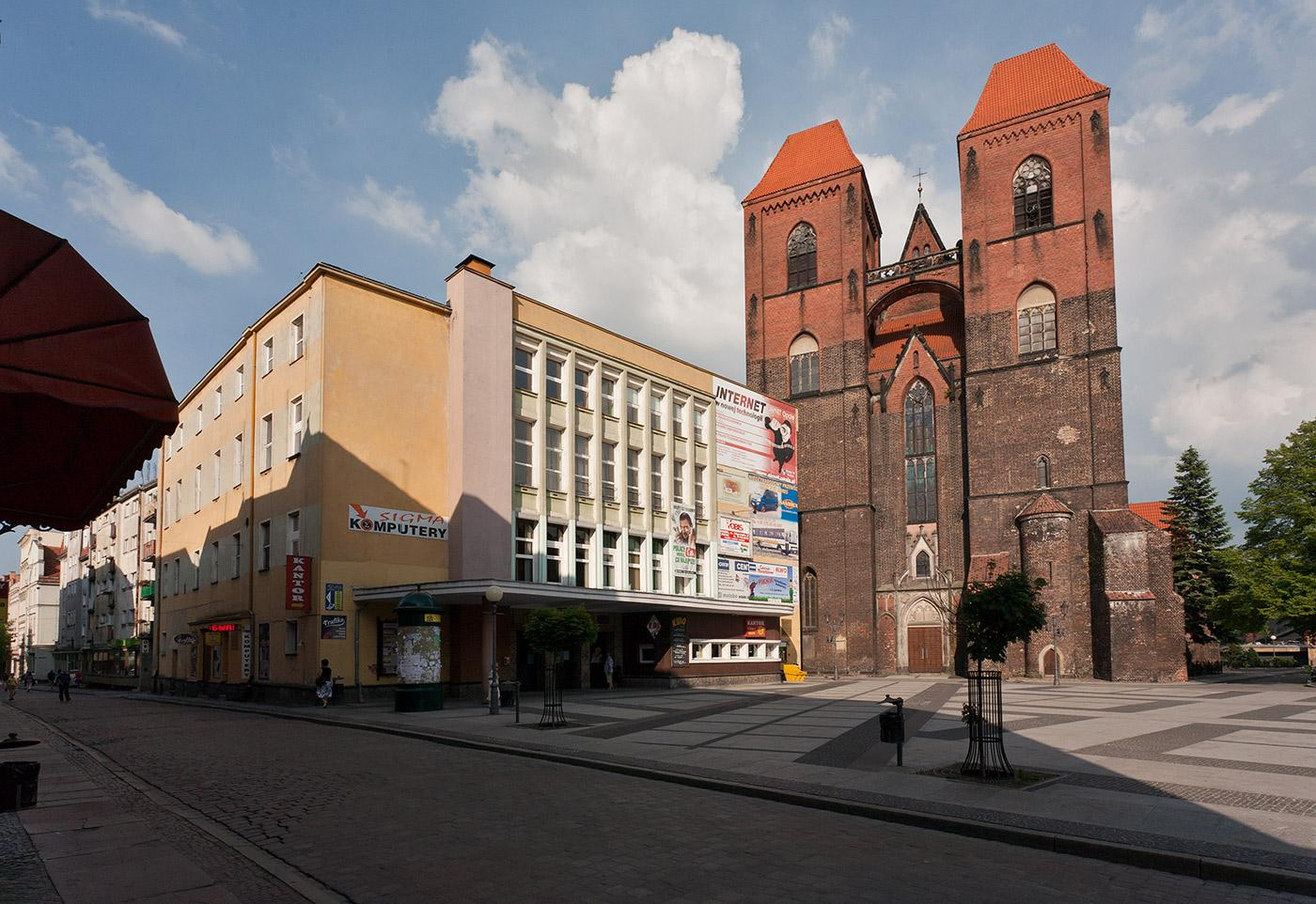
The church and Brzeski Dom Kultury cultural centre

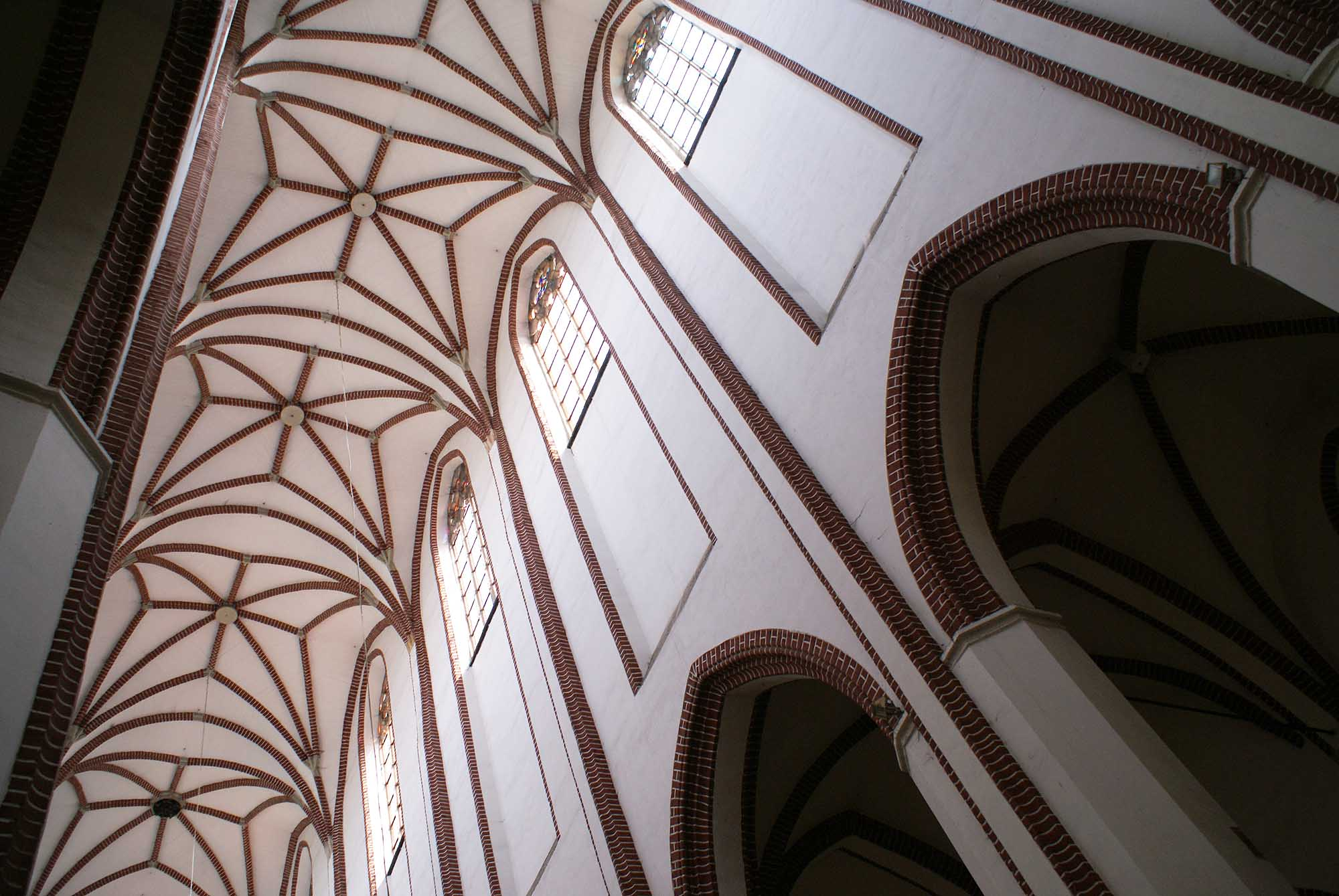
View of the church ceiling

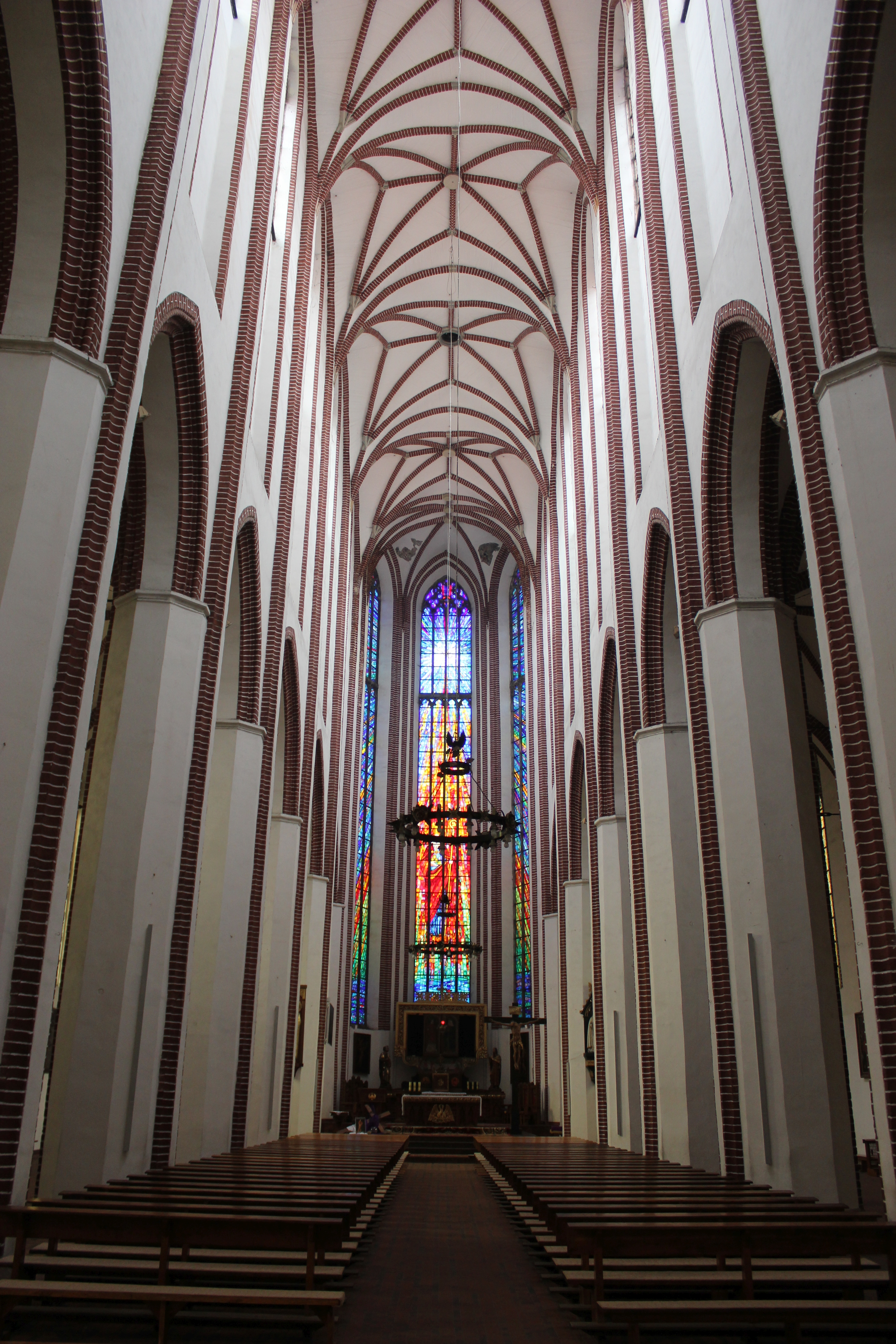
Church interior from western entrance

== See also ==
- Brzeg Castle
- Holy Cross Church, Brzeg
