= Brzeg Castle =

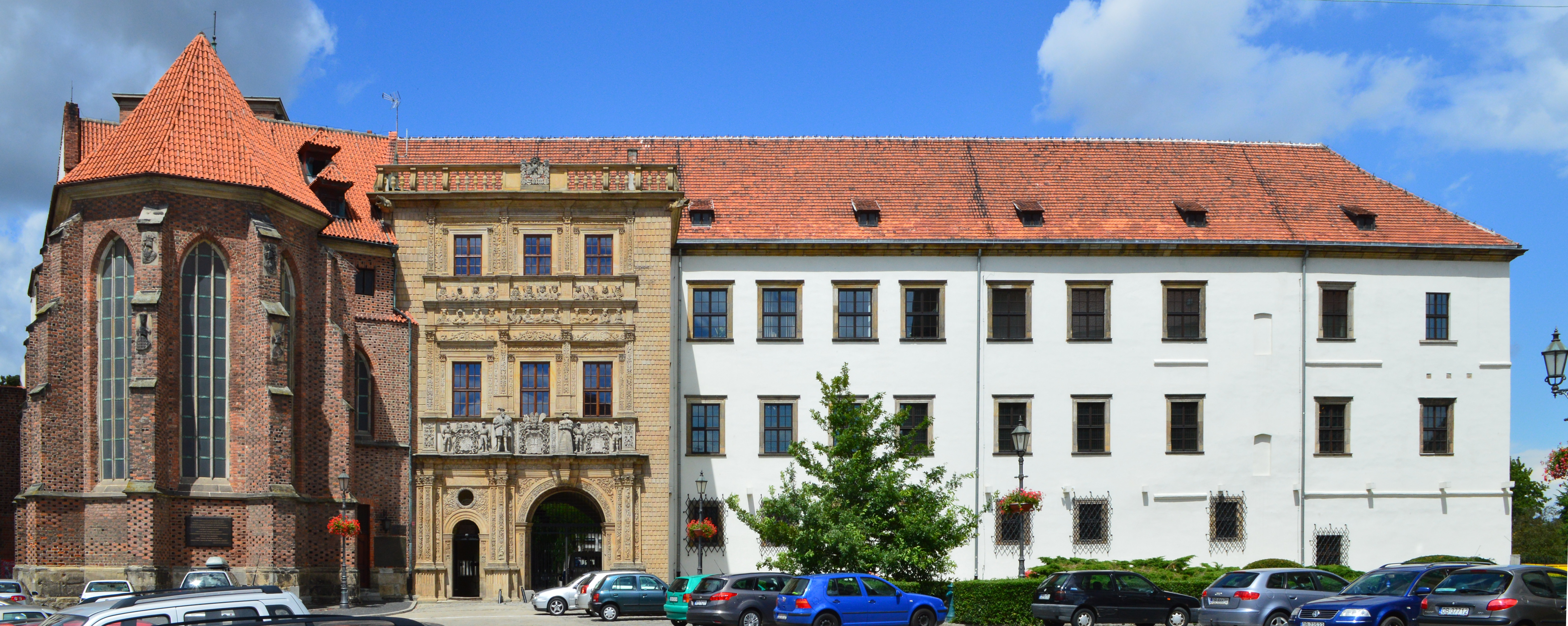
- Brzeg Castle

- Location of Brzeg Castle in Poland Brzeg Castle (Opole Voivodeship)
- 50.86375°N 17.4669°E
- Location: Brzeg, Opole Voivodeship, Poland

History
- Built: 1235

Site notes
- Architectural style: Renaissance

Historic Monument of Poland
- Designated: 2018-12-10
- Reference no.: Dz. U. z 2019 r. poz. 71

Brzeg Castle is located in Brzeg, Opole Voivodeship, Poland. Now a museum, the structures includes the Piast dynasty mausoleum.

== Geography ==
Brzeg Castle is located on a cliff to the west of the Oder River, in the city of Brzeg on the border of Lower Silesian Voivodeship and the Opole Voivodeship provinces in southwestern Poland. It is situated near the national road 39 between Namysłów and Strzelin.

== History ==
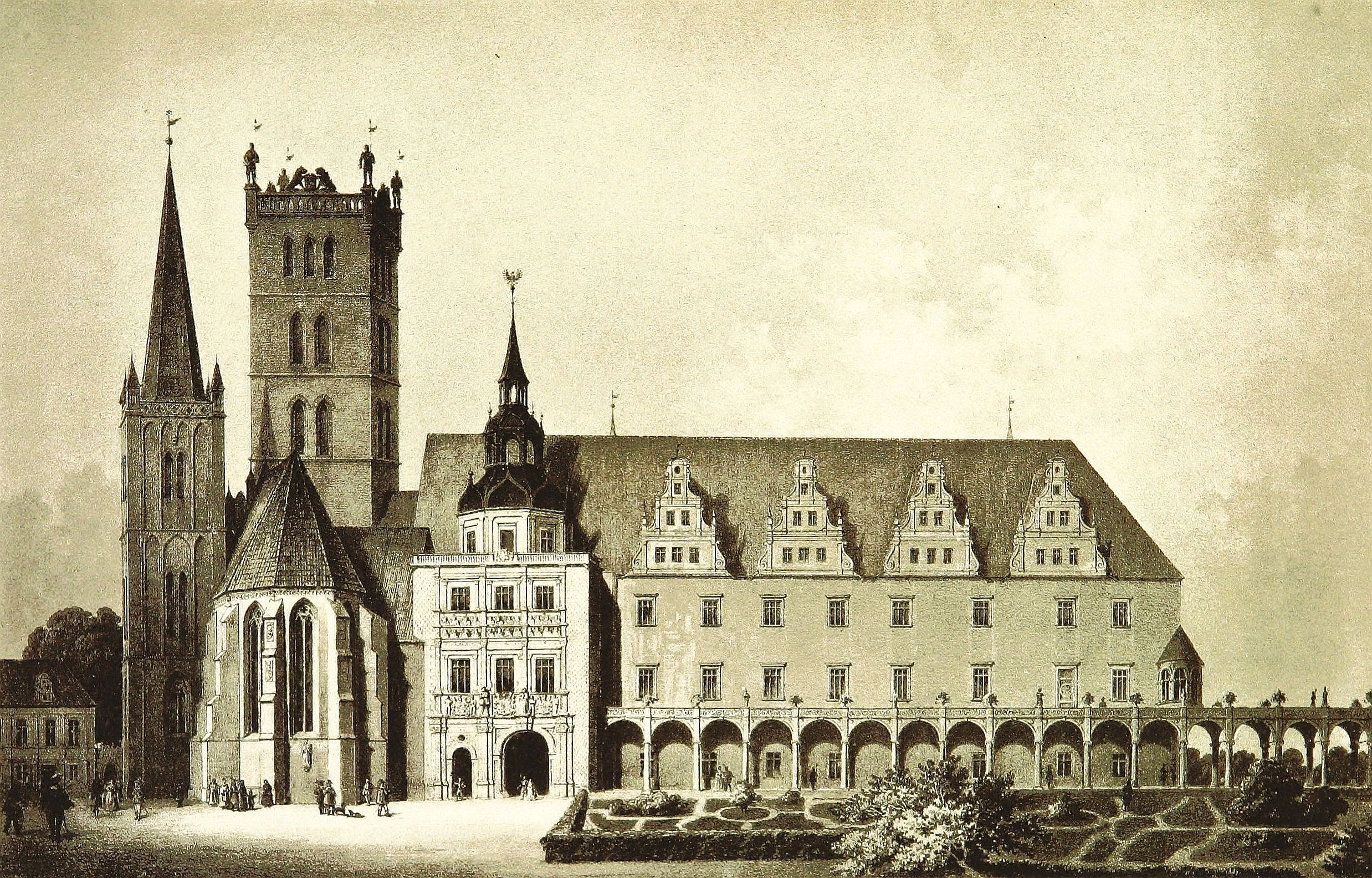
Nineteenth-century view with the castle gardens

Earliest reports of the castle's existence describe a small fortress with a moat and fortified walls, built in 1235 during the reign of Henry I the Bearded. A square tower known as "The Tower of Lions" was built adjoining the castle. The Piast family branch, which ruled over Duchy of Brzeg, lived in the castle between 1311 until 1675. In 1342, the castle was made the capital seat of the duchy after which it was refurbished many times. In 1370, Prince Ludwik I extended the castle and constructed its chapel which includes the Piast dynasty mausoleum. During Frederick II of Legnica's reign in 1544, more buildings were added to the castle, with the construction completed in 1560. The additions were in the form of two new buildings, a large courtyard enclosing the buildings and an ambulatory. Additional structures built during this period included a tower gate which was the entrance to the structure. Busts of the Piast princes were part of the gate's decor. Modifications in design were from the Gothic style fort to the Renaissance type of architecture in Silesia.

In 1741, the castle was destroyed by the Prussian forces in the First Silesian War, during which the ruins were used as a warehouse for the Prussian Army. After the war, the town – called Brieg in German – with most of Silesia was annexed from Austria to Prussia.

During a fire in 1801, there was further damage to the castle. In 1920, reconstruction of the abandoned castle began, but during World War II, damage to the castle was quite extensive. The castle was rebuilt in Renaissance style during 1966–1978 and again from 1980 to 1994. It currently serves as the Museum of the Silesian Piasts (Muzeum Piastów Śląskich).

== Features ==
The rebuilt castle is also called "The Silesian Wawel". It was rebuilt by Jakub Parr, Franciscus Pahr, and Bernard Niuron from Italy. Its present facade is known as "one of the most magnificent historical monument of the Renaissance period in Central Europe". The courtyard has been restored with triple story galleries. The interior of some rooms in the eastern wing, which are in the Renaissance style on the ground floor, are well preserved.

The museum, which is part of the castle, has exhibits which trace the history of the Silesian Piasts. Some of the notable paintings exhibited are from a collection of the National Museum of Wrocław and paintings of Michael Willmann, a Silesian Baroque painter. The museum also has well-preserved sarcophaguses of the dukes of Legnica and Brzeg. Dating to the 14th century, Poland's only "perfectly preserved medieval hunting bow" is an archaeological find from excavations at Brzeg's Mleczna Street.

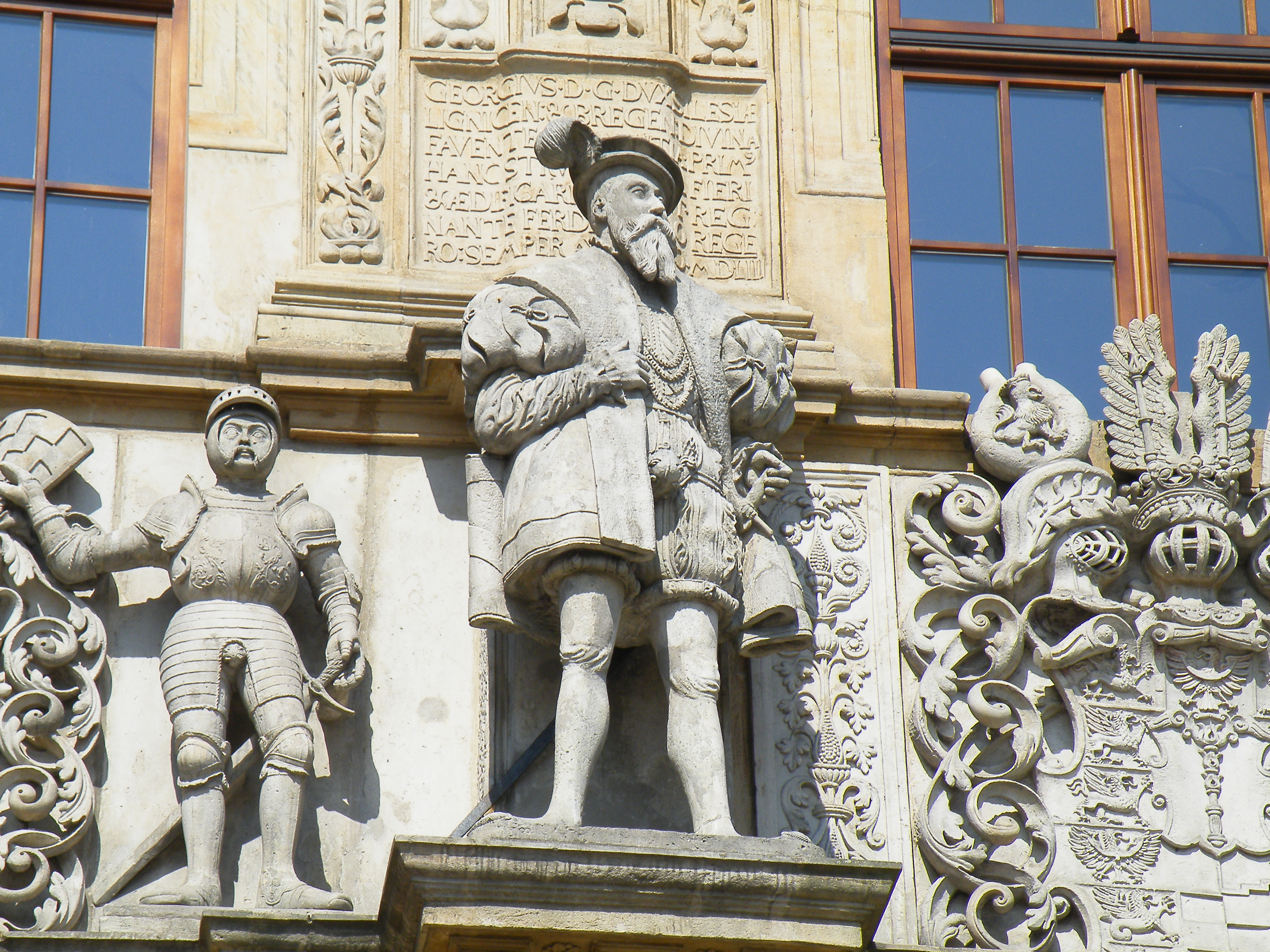
Front portal of the Brzeg Castle Gatehouse

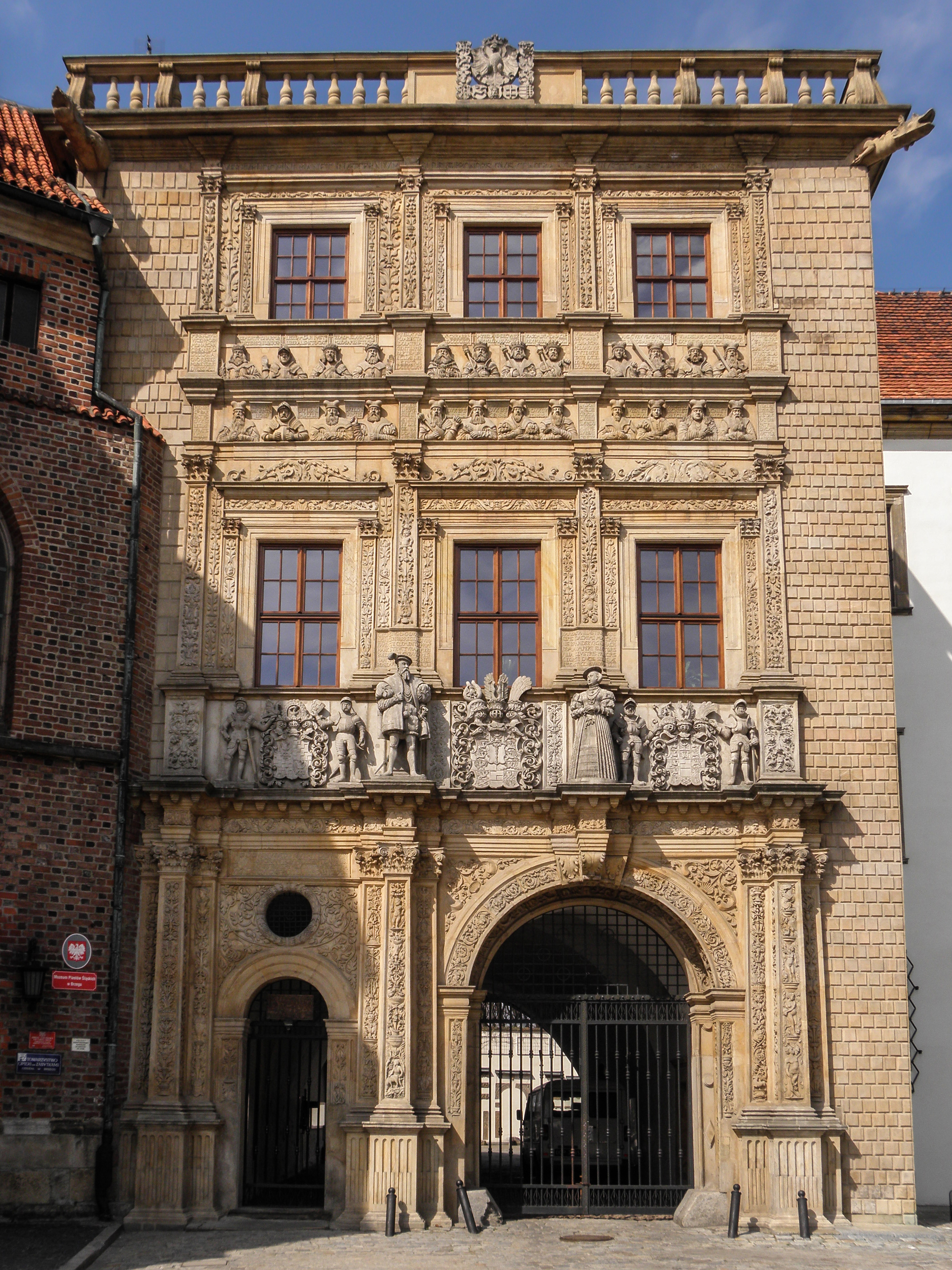
Brzeg Castle Gatehouse

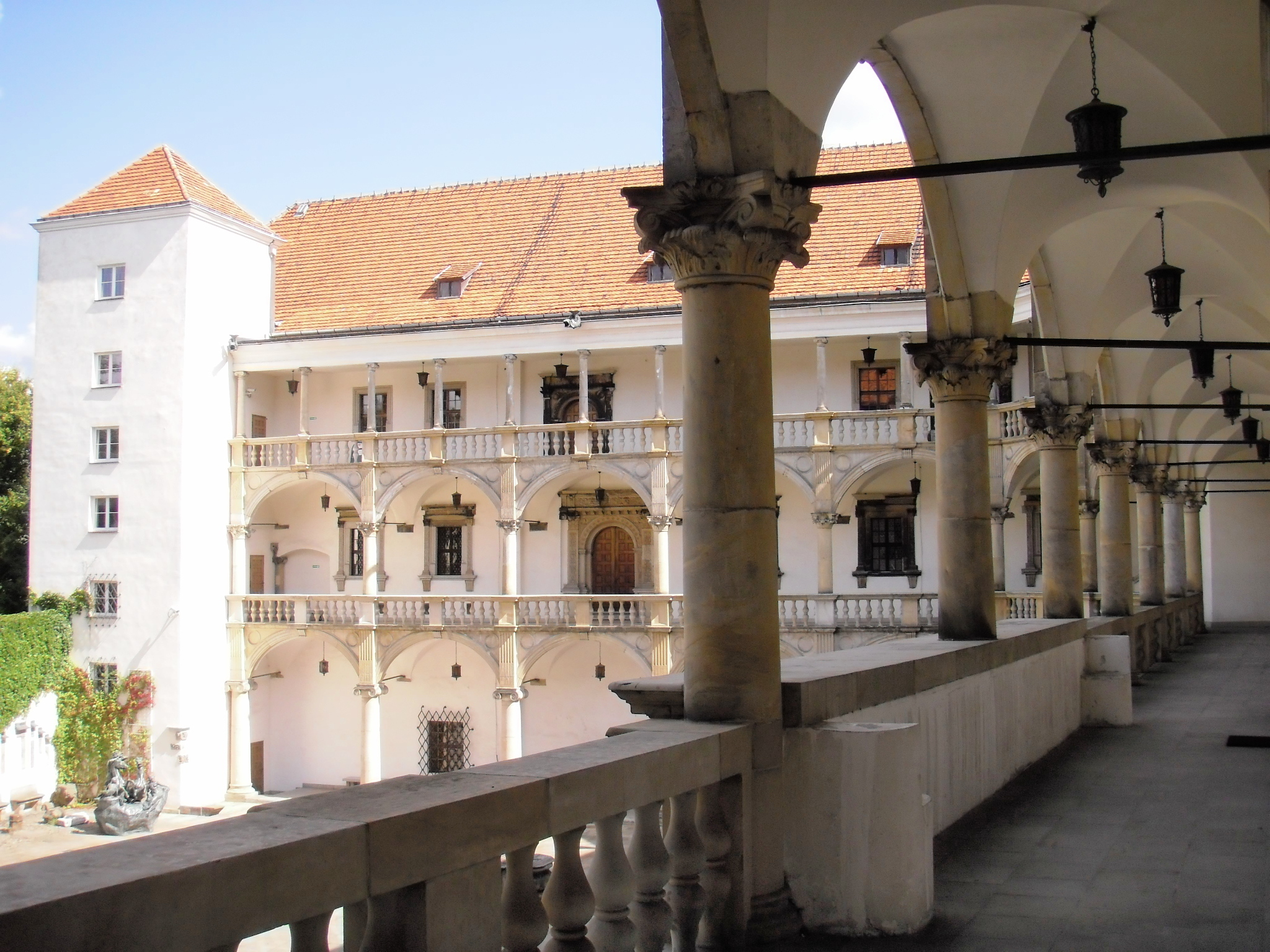
Courtyard

== See also ==
- St. Jadwiga's Church, Brzeg
- Holy Cross Church, Brzeg
- Castles in Poland
- 16th-century Western domes
