= Lower Silesia =

Historical region in Central Europe

Lower Silesia: Dolny Śląsk (Polish); Dolní Slezsko (Czech); Niederschlesien (German); Dolny Ślōnsk (Silesian); Niederschläsing (Lower Silesian)
- Historical region
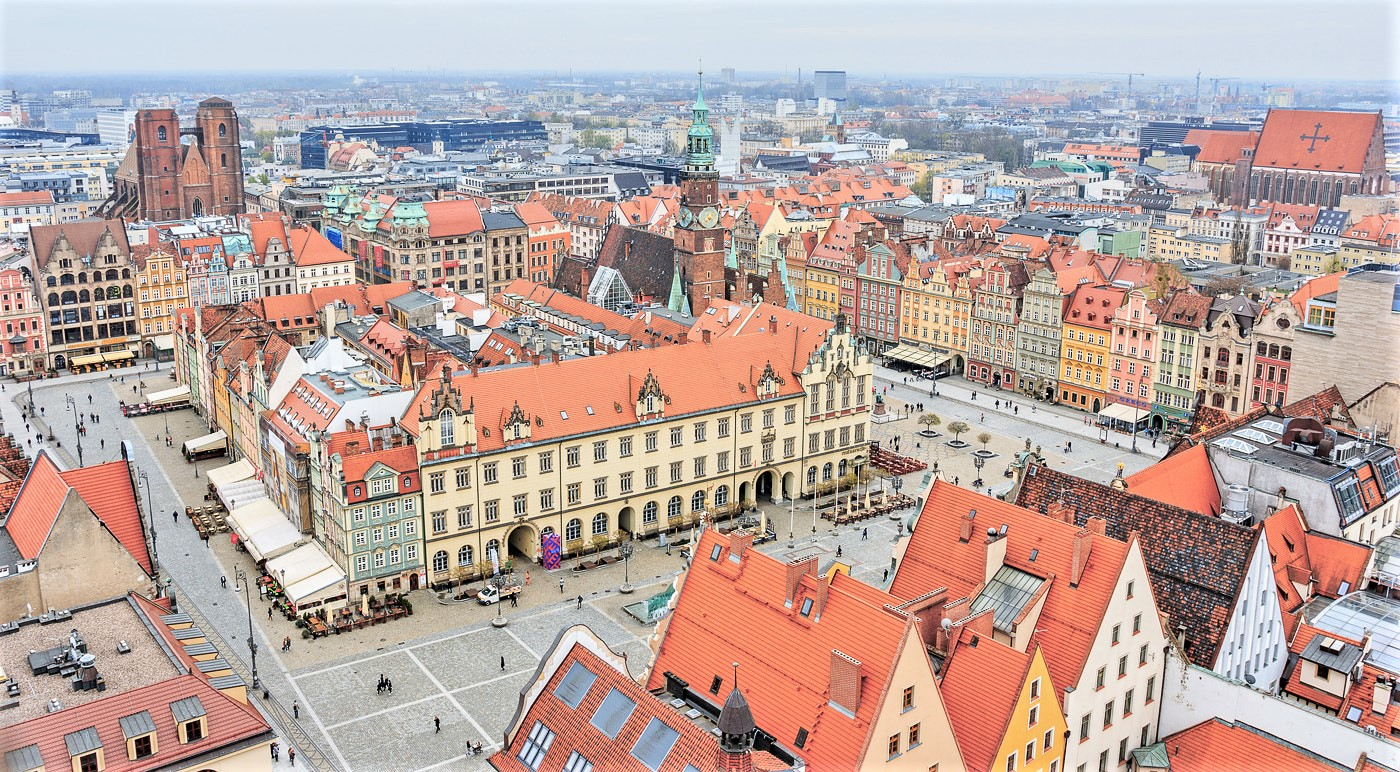
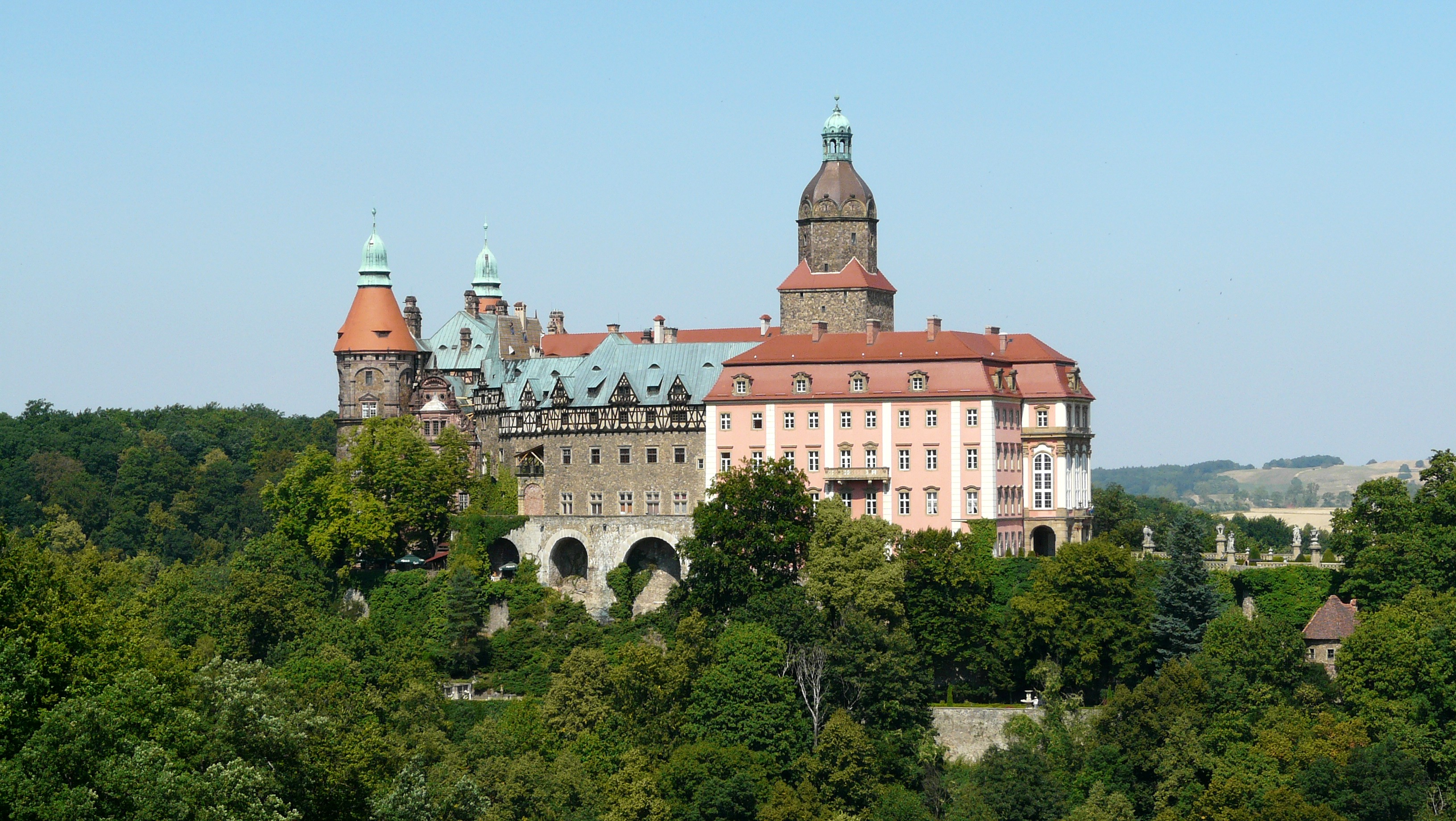
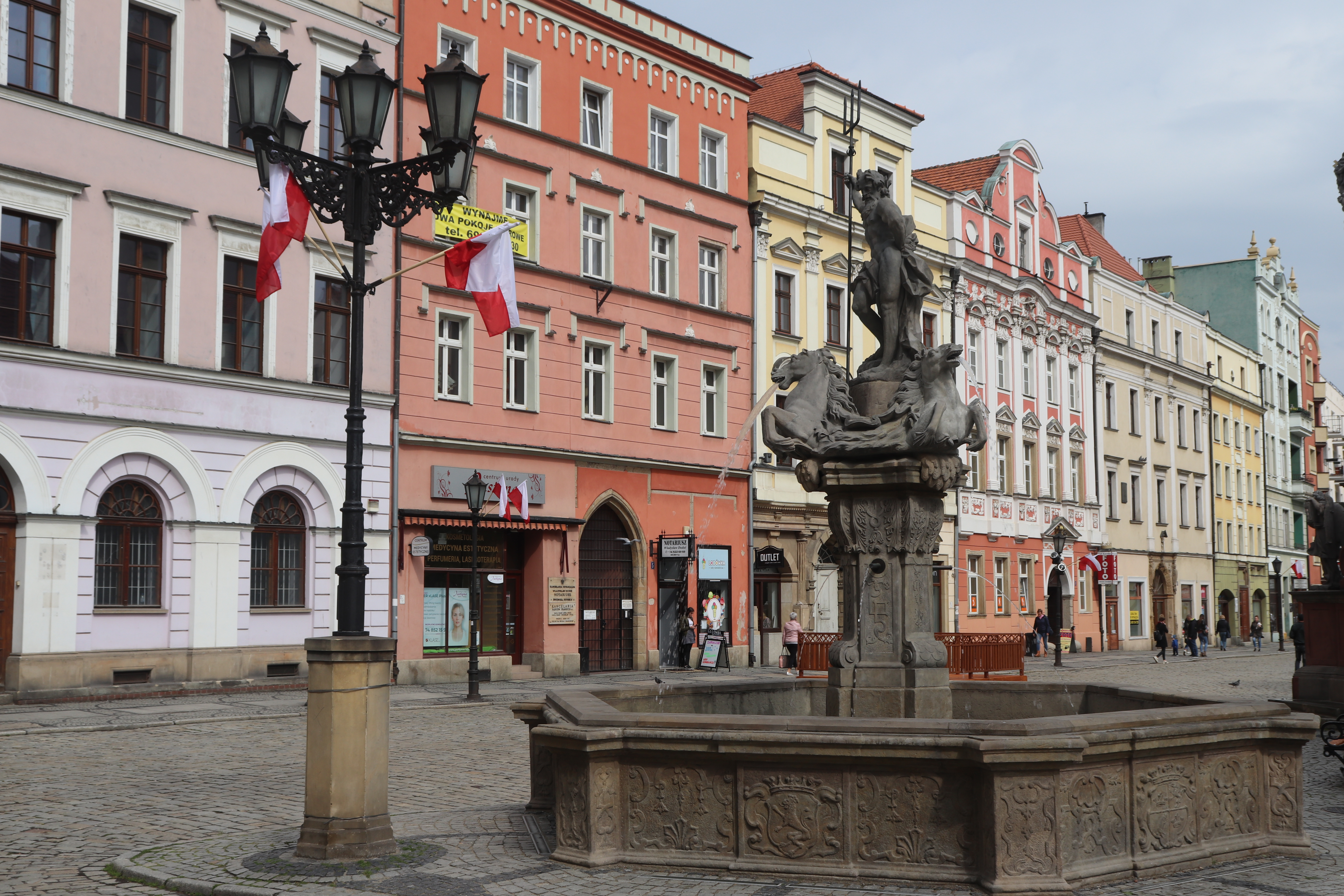
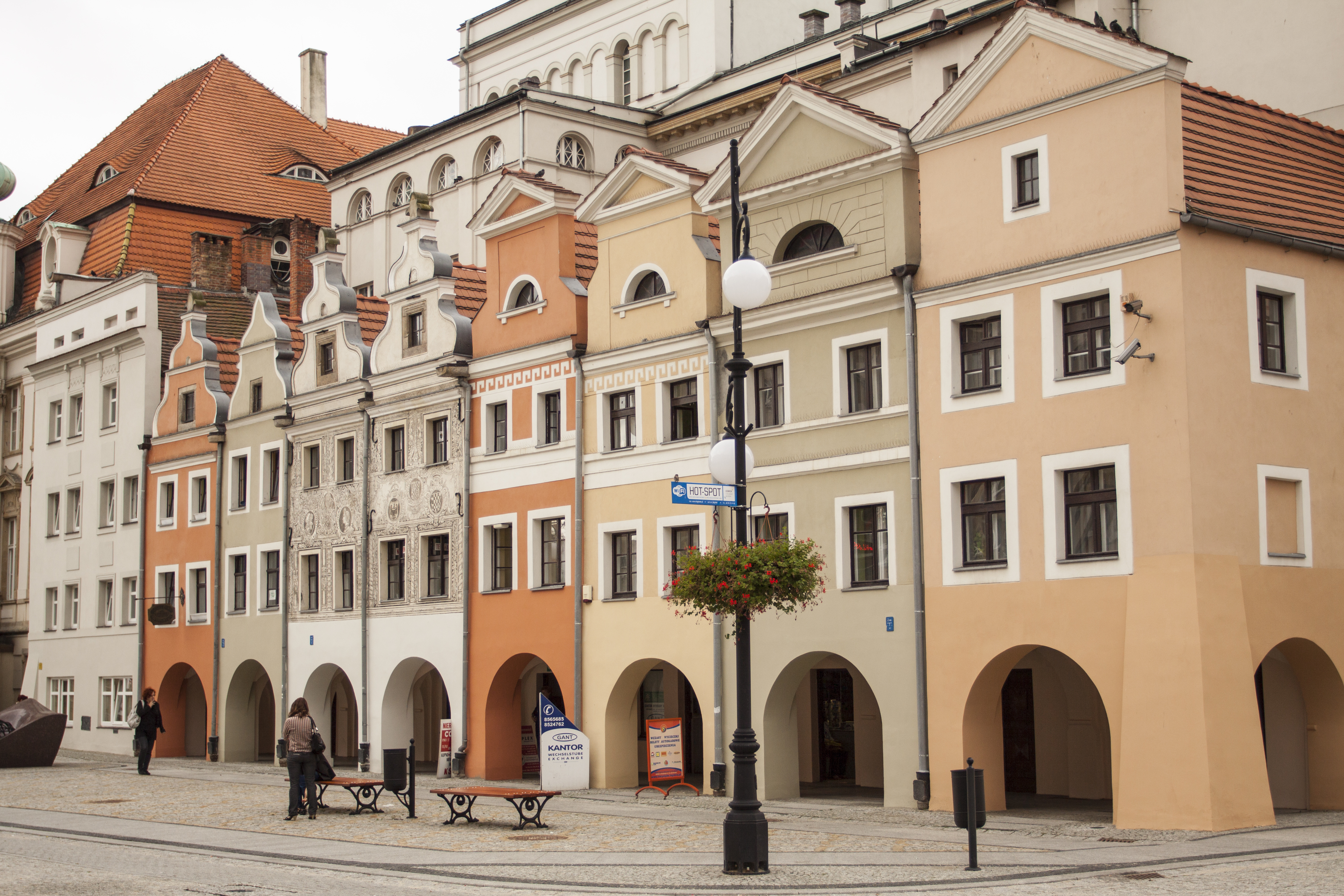
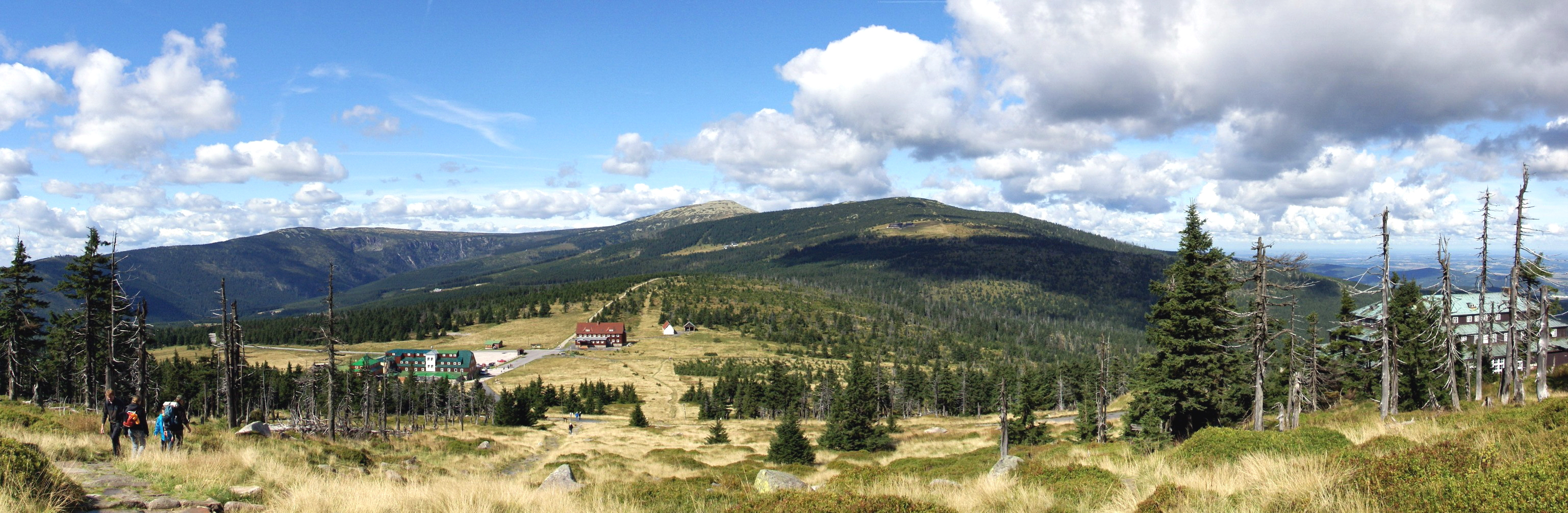
- Wrocław Old Town Książ Castle Market Square in Świdnica Market Square in Legnica Przełęcz Karkonoska

- Flag Coat of arms

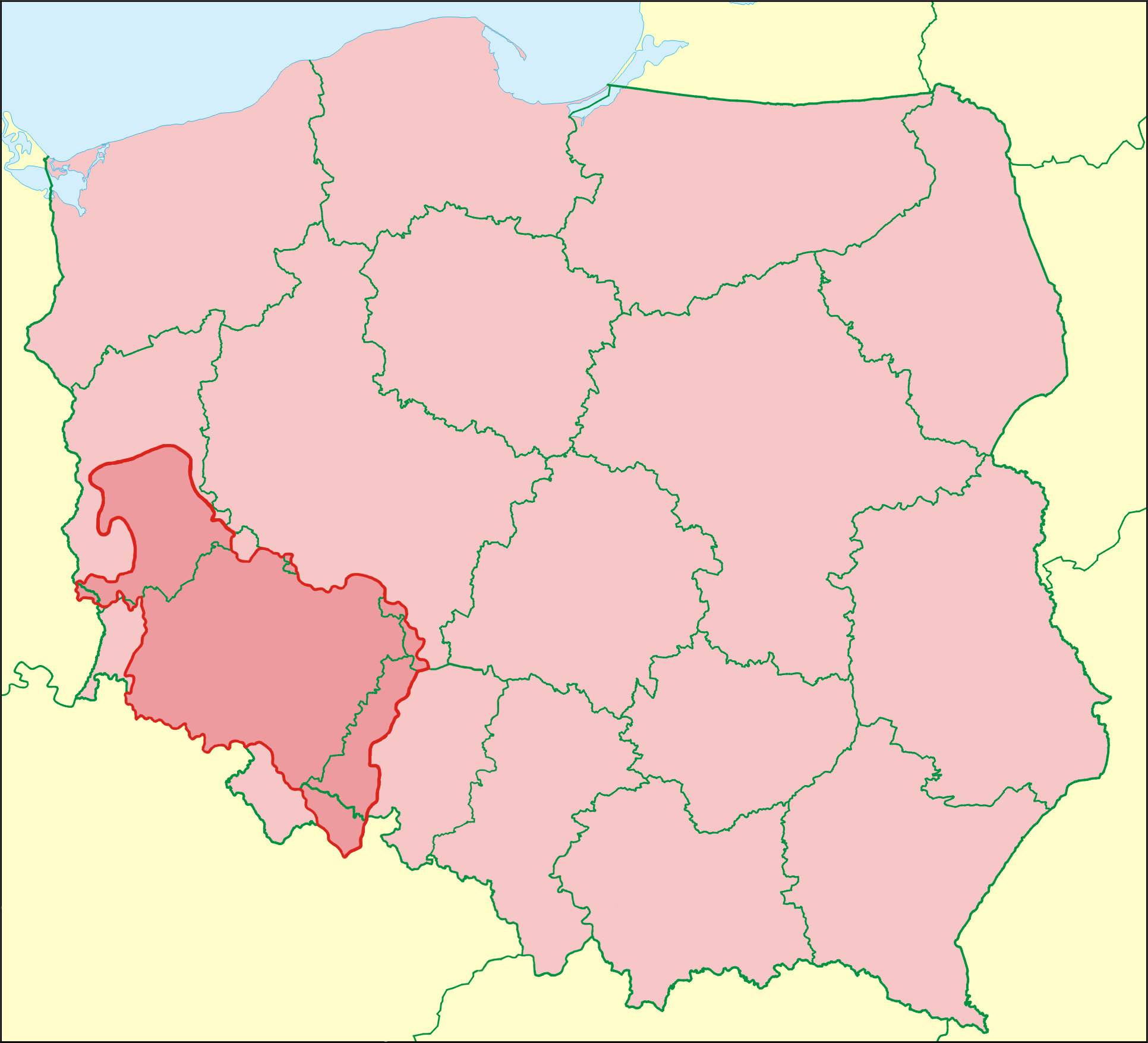
- Location of Lower Silesia in Poland
- Country: Poland; Czech Republic; Germany
- Historical capital: Wrocław
- Time zone: UTC+1 (CET)
  - Summer (DST): UTC+2 (CEST)
- Primary airports: Wrocław Airport; Zielona Góra Airport

Lower Silesia (Polish: Dolny Śląsk [ˈdɔlnɨ ˈɕlɔ̃sk]; Czech: Dolní Slezsko; German: Niederschlesien [ˈniːdɐˌʃleːzi̯ən]; Silesian: Dolny Ślōnsk; Upper Sorbian: Delnja Šleska [ˈdɛlnʲa ˈʃlɛska]; Lower Sorbian: Dolna Šlazyńska [ˈdɔlna ˈʃlazɨnʲska]; Lower Silesian: Niederschläsing; Latin: Silesia Inferior) is a historical and geographical region mostly located in Poland with small portions in the Czech Republic and Germany. It is the western part of the region of Silesia. Its largest city is Wrocław.

The first state to have a stable hold over the territory of what will be considered Lower Silesia was the short-lived Great Moravia in the 9th century. Afterwards, in the Middle Ages, Lower Silesia was part of Piast-ruled Poland. It was one of the leading regions of Poland, and its capital Wrocław was one of the main cities of the Polish Kingdom. Lower Silesia emerged as a distinctive region during the fragmentation of Poland in 1172, when the Duchies of Opole and Racibórz, considered Upper Silesia since, were formed of the eastern part of the Duchy of Silesia, and the remaining, western part was since considered Lower Silesia. The oldest Polish writing and first Polish print were created in the region. During the Ostsiedlung, the Piast rulers invited German settlers to settle in the region, which until then had a Polish majority. As a result, the region became largely German-speaking by the end of the 15th century.

With the Treaty of Trentschin the region fell under the overlordship of the Bohemian Crown in 1335 and thus became part of the Holy Roman Empire. Large parts remained under the rule of local Polish dukes of the Piast, Jagiellonian and Sobieski dynasties, some up to the 17th and 18th century. Briefly under the suzerainty of the Kingdom of Hungary, Lower Silesia fell to the Austrian Habsburg monarchy in 1526.

Silesian coat of arms, as drawn c. 1890 by Hugo Gerard Ströhl

In 1742, Austria ceded nearly all of Lower Silesia to the Kingdom of Prussia in the Treaty of Berlin, except for the southern part of the Duchy of Neisse. Within the Prussian kingdom, the region became part of the Province of Silesia. In 1871, the Prussian-controlled portion of Lower Silesia was integrated into the German Empire. After World War I, Lower Silesia was divided, as small parts were reintegrated with Poland and Czechoslovakia, which both regained independence.

After Germany's defeat in World War II in 1945, most of the region became once again part of Poland. A smaller part west of the Oder-Neisse line became part of East Germany; Czech Lower Silesia (Jesenicko and Opavsko regions) remained as a part of Czechoslovakia. By 1949, almost the entire pre-war German population had been expelled. Poles displaced from the former Polish lands incorporated into the USSR settled in Lower Silesia after the war, as well as Polish settlers from other parts of Poland.

The region is known for its historic architecture of various styles, including many castles and palaces, well preserved or reconstructed old towns, numerous spa towns, and historic burial sites of Polish monarchs and consorts (in Wrocław, Legnica and Trzebnica).

== Geography ==
Lower Silesia is located mostly in the basin of the middle Oder River with its historic capital in Wrocław.

The southern border of Lower Silesia is mapped by the mountain ridge of the Western and Central Sudetes, which since the High Middle Ages formed the border between Polish Silesia and the historic Bohemian region of the present-day Czech Republic. The Bóbr and Kwisa rivers are considered being the original western border with the Lusatias, however, the Silesian Duchy of Żagań reached up to the Neisse river, including two villages (Pechern and Neudorf) on the western shore, which became Silesian in 1413.

The later Silesian Province of Prussia further comprised the adjacent lands of historic Upper Lusatia ceded by the Kingdom of Saxony after the Napoleonic Wars in 1815, its westernmost point could be found as far west as the small village of Lindenau (now belonging to the German state of Brandenburg). To the north, Lower Silesia originally stretched up to Świebodzin and Krosno Odrzańskie, which was acquired by the Margraves of Brandenburg in 1482. The Barycz river forms the border with historic Greater Poland in the northeast, the Upper Silesian lands lie to the southeast.

Administratively Polish Lower Silesia is shared between Lower Silesian Voivodeship (except for the Upper Lusatian counties of Lubań and Zgorzelec, and former Bohemian Kłodzko), the southern part of Lubusz Voivodeship (i.e. the counties of Krosno, Nowa Sól, Świebodzin, Żagań and Zielona Góra with the city of Zielona Góra, as well as western Opole Voivodeship (the counties of Brzeg, Namysłów and Nysa).

The tiny part of the former Duchy of Żagań on the western shore of the Neisse is today part of the Krauschwitz municipality in the Görlitz district of Saxony, the larger Upper Lusatian parts of Prussian Silesia ("Silesian Upper Lusatia") west of the Neisse comprised the town of Görlitz and the former district of Hoyerswerda, which today forms the northern part of the Saxon Görlitz and Bautzen districts as well as the southern part of the Oberspreewald-Lausitz district in Brandenburg. The southern part of the former Duchy of Nysa, which remained a part of Austrian Silesia after 1742, namely the Jeseník District and Heřmanovice, Mnichov and Železná, as well as parts of Vrbno pod Pradědem in the Bruntál District, today belongs to the Czech Republic.

Lower Silesia is bordered by Greater Poland and Lubusz Land in the north, Upper Silesia in the east, Moravia in the south-east, Bohemia and Kłodzko Land in the south, and Lusatia in the west.

=== Sudetes ===
Śnieżka - the highest peak in Lower Silesia

The Sudetes are a geologically diverse mountain range that stretches for 280 kilometres (170 miles) from the Lusatian Highlands in the west and to the Moravian Gate in the east. They are topographically divided into Western, Central and Eastern Sudetes.

The Lower Silesian section of the Sudetes comprises the Jizera Mountains (highest peak: Wysoka Kopa, 1,126 metres or 3,694 feet), where the tripoint with Upper Lusatia and Bohemia is located near the Smrk summit, along with the adjacent Giant Mountains (highest: border peak of Sněžka Śnieżka – highest mountain of Czech Republic, 1,603 m or 5,259 ft); Rudawy Janowickie (Skalnik, 945 m or 3,100 ft); Owl Mountains (Wielka Sowa, 1,015 m or 3,330 ft); Stone Mountains (Waligóra 936 m or 3,071 ft); Wałbrzych Mountains (Borowa 853 m or 2,799 ft) and the Kaczawskie Mountains (Okole, 725 m or 2,379 ft) with Ostrzyca, 501 m or 1,644 ft - they surround the Jelenia Góra valley, 420–450 m or 1,380–1,480 ft; Ślęża Massif (Mount Ślęża 718 m or 2,356 ft), massive of Orlické hory, Králický Sněžník south of Kłodzko, Rychlebské hory and Jeseníky (English: Ashes mountains; Praděd, 1,492 m or 4,895 ft).

=== Silesian Lowland ===
The adjacent Silesian Lowland includes the Silesian Lowlands and the Silesian-Lusatian Lowlands. These two lowlands are separated with each other by Dolina Kaczawy, and from the Sudetes by a steep morphological edge located along the Sudeten Marginal Fault, extended from Bolesławiec (the Northwest) to Złoty Stok (the Southeast). The southern part of the Lowland includes The Sudeten Foreland, consisting of quite low Wzgórze Strzegomskie, 232 m or 761 ft, Grupa Ślęży (Mount Ślęża, 718 m or 2,356 ft), and Wzgórza Niemczańsko-Strzelińskie (Gromnik Mountain, 392 m or 1,286 ft). Lower hills occur also in areas of Obniżenie Sudeckie, Świdnik, and Kotlina Dzierżoniowska. The eastern part of Silesian Lowland consists of the wide Silesian Lowlands, located along banks of the Oder River. The eastern part includes also Równina Wrocławska with its surrounding lands: Równina Oleśnicka, Wysoczyzna Średzka, Równina Grodkowska and Niemodlińska. Dolina Dolnej Kaczawy (Kotlina Legnicka) separates the Silesian Lowlands from the Silesian-Lusatian Lowlands, which includes Wysoczyzna Lubińsko-Chocianowska, Dolina Szprotawy, and wide areas of Bory Dolnośląskie, located to the north from the Bolesławiec-Zgorzelec road. From the North, the lowlands are delimited by Wał Trzebnicki, consisting of hills that are 200 km (120 mi) long and over 150 m (490 ft) high, in comparison to neighboring lowlands, Kobyla Mountain, 284 m (932 ft). The range of hills includes Wzgórza Dalkowskie, Wzgórza Trzebnickie, Wzgórza Twardogórskie, and Wzgórza Ostrzeszowskie. Obniżenie Milicko-Głogowskie, with Kotlina Żmigrodzka and Milicka, is located in the northern part, within the hills.

The region of the lowlands is coated with a thick layer of glacial elements (sand, gravel, clay) that covers more diverse relief of the older ground. Generally flat and wide bottoms of the valleys are padded with river settlements. Slopes of the hills over 180–200 m (590–660 ft) are coated with fertile clays and therefore, to begin with, the Paleozoic era, they became the lands for people to settle and cultivate intensively. The later form of the economy caused almost complete deforestation of the slopes. Not only fertile grounds, but also the mild climate is conductive to the development of agriculture and market gardening. The annual average temperature of the Wrocław area is 9.5 °C (49.1 °F). The average temperature of the hottest month (July) is 19 °C (66 °F), and −0.5 °C (31.1 °F) of the coldest month (January). The average amount of rainfall is 500–620 millimetres (20–24 inches), with its maximum in July and minimum in February. The snow layer disappears after 45 days. The winds, similar to those appearing in the West side of Poland, are West and Southwest.

Sudeten rivers are characterized by changeable water rates, and high pollution resulting from large industrialization of the area. The greatest rivers are Nysa Kłodzka, which is the source of drinking water for Wrocław (the water is drawn by special channel); Stobrawa, Oława, Ślęza, Bystrzyca with its tributaries—Strzegomka and Piława; Widawa, Średzka Woda, Kaczawa with Nysa Szalona and Czarna Woda. There is also the largest right-bank tributary of the area, Barycz. The other quite large rivers, Bóbr, Kwisa, and Lusatian Neisse, flow into the Oder River beyond Lower Silesian borders. The majority of the rivers is regulated and their basins are improved, which is conductive to the proper water economy. The characteristic feature of the landscape of the lowland is the lack of lakes. The region of Legnica is the only place where a dozen or so of small lakes survived, but the majority of them is already disappearing. The largest one is Jezioro Kunickie (95 hectares or 230 acres), Jezioro Koskowickie (50 ha or 120 acres), Jezioro Jaśkowickie (24 ha or 59 acres) and Tatarak (19.5 ha or 48 acres). In contrast to the number of lakes, there are large groups of artificial ponds founded in the Barycz basin, in the Middle Ages. Their total area amounts around 80 square kilometres (31 square miles), and the largest ponds (Stary Staw, Łosiowy Staw, Staw Niezgoda, Staw Mewi Duży, and Grabownica) come to 200–300 ha (490–740 acres).

The primeval flora has been transformed significantly as a result of deforestation and cultivation. The largest forest complexes are Bory Dolnośląskie (3,150 km^{2} or 1,220 sq mi), Bory Stobrawskie in Stobrawa and Widawa areas, and smaller fragments of forests in Barycz and Oder River valleys. These forests are kind of multi-species deciduous forests, occurring in fertile grounds. The Oder River valley is reach in groups of mixed forests (beech, oak, hornbeam, sycamore maple, and pine). These forests, with protected status, are: Zwierzyniec, Kanigóra near Oława, Dublany, Kępa Opatowicka near Wrocław, Zabór near Przedmoście, and Lubiąż. The other forest areas are The Natural Park in Orsk, the areas of Jodłowice, Wzgórze Joanny near Milicz, and Gola near Twardogóra. Such types of forest like those which are the mainstay for wild game or nurseries, are inaccessible because of permanent fire hazard. Territories partly accessible (marked specially) are located in areas of Góra Śląska, Oborniki Śląskie, Wołowa, in the Oder River valley, and in Wzgórza Niemczańsko-Strzelińskie.

=== Flora ===
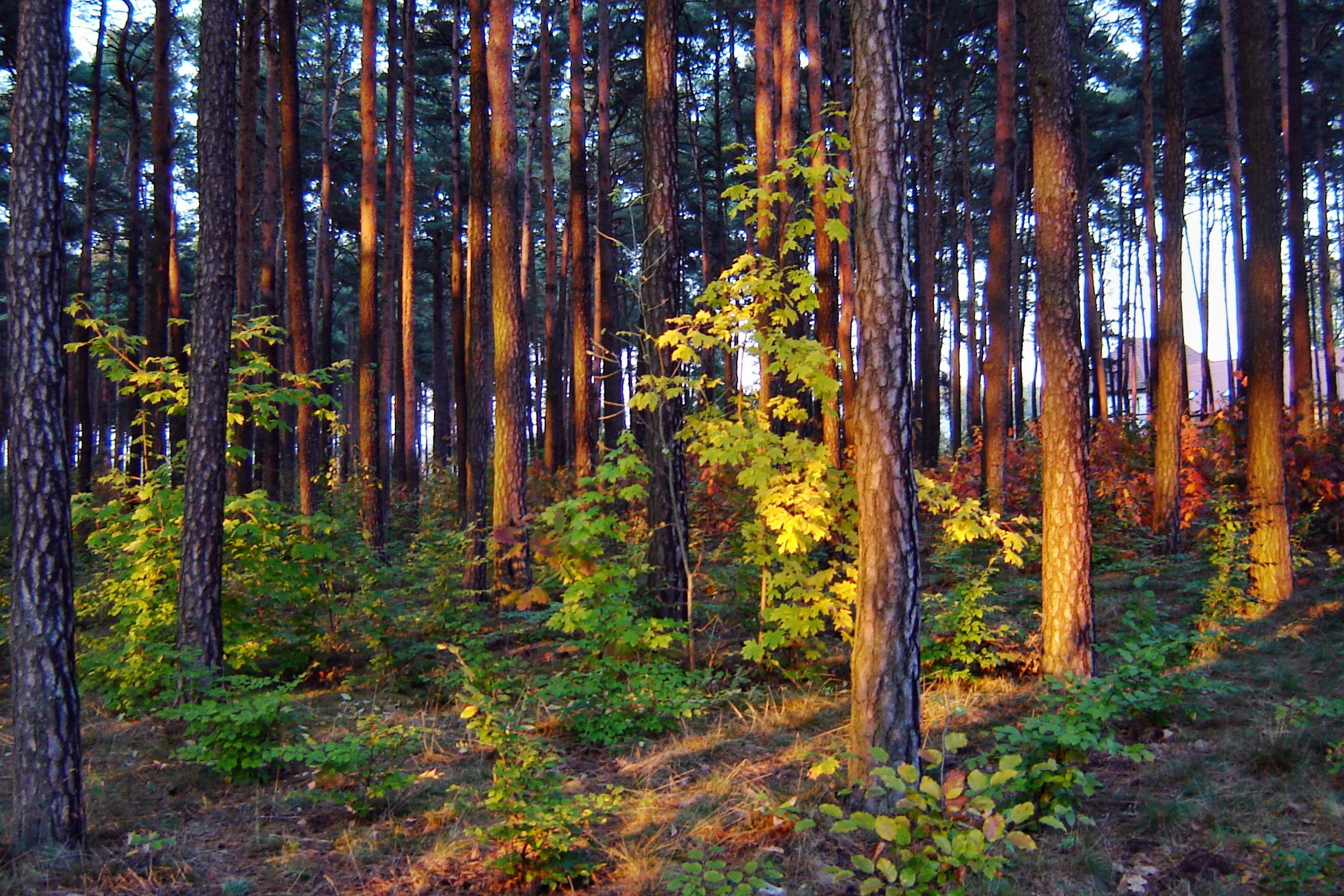
Lower Silesian Forest, the largest continuous forest of Poland

The flora of Lower Silesia is specific and different for each zone. From the bottoms to the top, plants form groups that are arranged in wide or narrow belts, called floral zones. Subsequently, these zones are divided into narrower belts, called vegetation belts.

The zone of mountain forest is divided into two belts: subalpine and lower subalpine forest. Above, there is a forestless zone divided into the subalpine belt with dwarf pine, and the alpine belt without shrubs. This vegetation is glacial; the former vegetation—from the Tertiary—was destroyed by the climate of the Ice Age. Along with glaciation from the North, some tundra plants appeared, for example downy willow (Salix lapponum) and cloudberry (Rubus chamaemorus). The flora of Lower Silesia is strongly influenced by geological and climatic history. The vegetation is formed by species deriving from various geographic regions. Particular regions are represented by:

- Central European species: fir (Abies alba), beech (Fagus silvatica), oak (Quercus petraea), maple (Acer pseudoplatanus)
- European Syberian species: European spindle-tree (Evonymus europaea), alder (Alnus glutinosa), wicker (Salix purpurea)
- Boreal-Sub arctic species: cress (Cardamine pratensis), yellow marsh marigold (Caltha palustris), liverleaf (Hepatica nobilis)
- Boreal-Arctic species: bearberry (Arctostaphylos uva-ursi), dwarf willow (Salix herbacea), black crowberry (Empetrum nigrum), Sudetic Lousewort (Pedicularis sudetica), alpine saxifrage (Micranthes nivalis), cloudberry (Rubus chamaemorus), lake quillwort (Isoëtes lacustris)
- Alpine species: Alpine bastard toadflax (Thesium alpinium), Alpine coltsfoot (Homogyne alpina), mountain avens (Geum montanum), mountain pine (Pinus mugo)
- Sudetic and Sudetic-Carpathian species: mossy saxifrage (Saxifraga moschata ssp. Basaltica), Sudetic lousewort (Pedicularis sudetica)

=== Lower subalpine forest ===
Lower subalpine forest (Polish: Regiel Dolny), 450–1,000 m (1,480–3,280 ft), is characterized by deciduous or mixed forest. The fragments of forests similar to natural complexes of pine-fir-beech with admixture of larch, sycamore maple and lime occur near the Szklarski waterfall, in the Jagniątkowski complex, and Chojnik Mountain. Particular species of trees have different climatic requirements. The lowest parts are covered with oak and ash, up to 500 m (1,600 ft). On the level of 500–600 m (2,000 ft) occurs pine; in the higher parts, up to 800 m (2,600 ft), there occurs European larch; and above 800 m, fir and beech.

Despite transformation of the basic tree vegetation, the same form of undergrowth survived. There occurs: daphne mezereum, red elderberry, hazel, platanthera bifolia, sweet woodruff, Herb Paris, cranberry, wood sorrel, chickweed wintergreen, Common Cow-wheat and lily of the valley. The parts over 800 m are mainly covered with grasses, purple small-reeds, cranberries, and willow gentian.

In highlighted places, on meadows, and along roads, there occurs: spotted orchid, bugleweed, yellow archangel, arnica montana, sword-leaved helleborine, rosebay willowherb, groundsel, and foxglove. Along riversides, there occurs white butterbur.

Pine forests are rich in spruces, which are permanently weakened by atmospheric factors. Frayed roots are easily infected by harmful fungus and insects. The most damaging is honey mushroom, with edible specimen, which grows in pulp, between the bark and timber, causing the death of tree. The other damaging fungus is bracket fungus, which destroys roots and trunks from the inside. The honey mushroom devastates the tree within a few months, and the bracket fungus, within a few years, as a result of mechanic changes in wood structure.

== History ==
=== Ancient history ===
At the close of the Ice Age, the first man appeared at the Silesian Lowland. In the Mesolithic (7,000 years ago), the first nomadic people settled in Lower Silesia, living in caves and primitive chalets. They were collectors, hunters, and fishers, and used weapons and other tools made of stone and wood. In the Upper Paleolithic, the oldest human remains of the nomadic people, which were 40,000 years old, were found in a tomb in Tyniec on the river Ślęża.

In the Neolithic (4000–1700 BC), began the process of transformation into a settled way of life. The first rural settlements were made, as people began to farm and breed animals. Mining, pottery, and weaving are dated to this period. Serpentinite quarries came into existence, of which Silesian hatchets were made, and near Jordanów Śląski, people extracted nephrite that was transformed into diverse tools. In the Bronze Age (1700–1500 BC), the evolution of different cultures developed to the existence of Unetice culture that affected the existence of Trzciniec culture. In the next periods since c. 750 BC, it encompasses all of Europe.

=== Early history ===
In the La Tène culture period, Lower Silesia was inhabited by the Celts, who had their main place of cult on the Mount Ślęża. Their stony statues situated on and around this hill were later worshipped by the Slavic tribes that came here around the sixth century AD. Magna Germania (second century) records that between the Celtic and the Slavic period, Lower Silesia was inhabited by a number of Germanic tribes. Among them, are the Vandals, the Lugii, and the Silingi, who might have given the Silesia region its name, though it is unclear and thus disputed. With the Germanic tribes leaving westward during the Migration Period, a number of new peoples arrived in Silesia from Sarmatia, Asia Minor, and the Asian steppes from the beginning of the sixth century.

The Bavarian Geographer (c. 845) referred to the West Slavic Ślężanie (the other possible source of the region's Śląsk and later Silesia name), centered on Niemcza, and Dziadoszanie tribes, while a 1086 document issued by Bishop Jaromir of Prague listed the Zlasane, Trebovane, Poborane, and Dedositze. At the same time, Upper Silesia was inhabited by the Opolanie, Lupiglaa, and Golenshitse tribes. In the late 9th century, the territory was subject to the Great Moravian realm of Prince Svatopluk I and from about 906 came under the rule of the Přemyslid duke Spytihnev I of Bohemia and his successors Vratislaus I, the alleged founder of Wrocław (Czech: Vratislav), and Boleslaus the Cruel.

=== Piast Kingdom of Poland ===
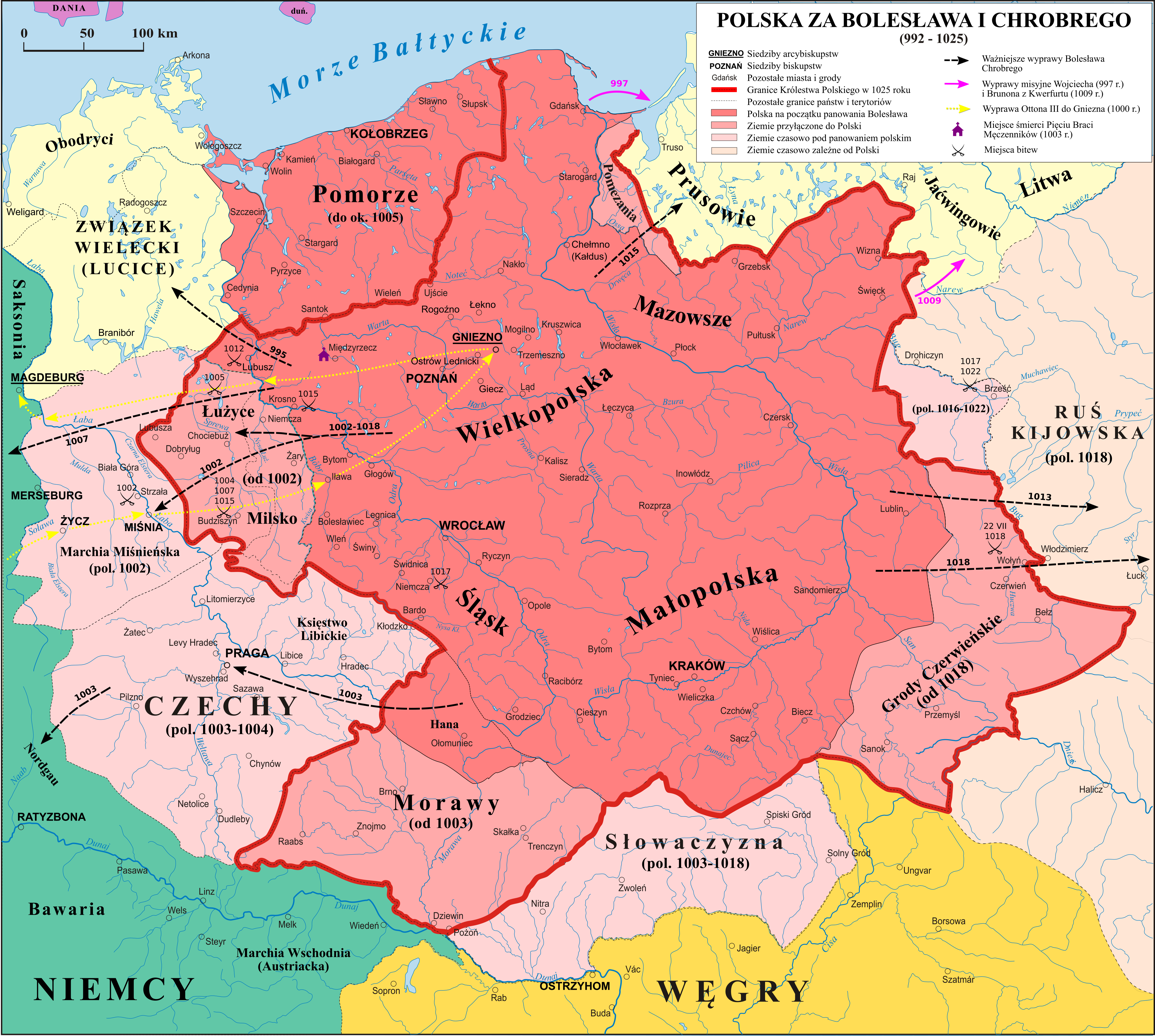
Kingdom of Poland with Lower Silesia under the first king Bolesław I the Brave

Meanwhile, the West Slavic Polans had established the first duchy under the Piast dynasty in the adjacent Greater Polish lands in the north. About 990 Silesia was conquered and incorporated into the first Polish state by the Piast duke Mieszko I, who had gained the support of Emperor Otto II against the Bohemian duke Boleslaus II.

In 1000 his son and successor Bolesław I Chrobry founded the Diocese of Wrocław, which, together with the Bishoprics of Kraków and Kołobrzeg, was placed under the Archbishopric of Gniezno in Greater Poland, founded by Emperor Otto III at the Congress of Gniezno in the same year. The ecclesial suzerainty of Gniezno over Wrocław lasted until 1821. After a temporary shift to Bohemia in the first half of the 11th century, Lower Silesia continued to be an integral part of the Polish state until the end of its fragmentation period when all Polish claims on this land were finally renounced in favor of the Bohemian kingdom in 1348.

Various Polish defensive battles against the invading Germans took place in the region in the Middle Ages, including the victorious battles of Niemcza in 1017 and Głogów and Psie Pole in 1109. In the early 12th century, Wrocław was named one of the three major cities of the Polish Kingdom alongside Kraków and Sandomierz in the oldest Polish chronicle, Gesta principum Polonorum. One of the largest battles of medieval Poland, the Battle of Legnica, during the first Mongol invasion of Poland was fought in the region 1241.

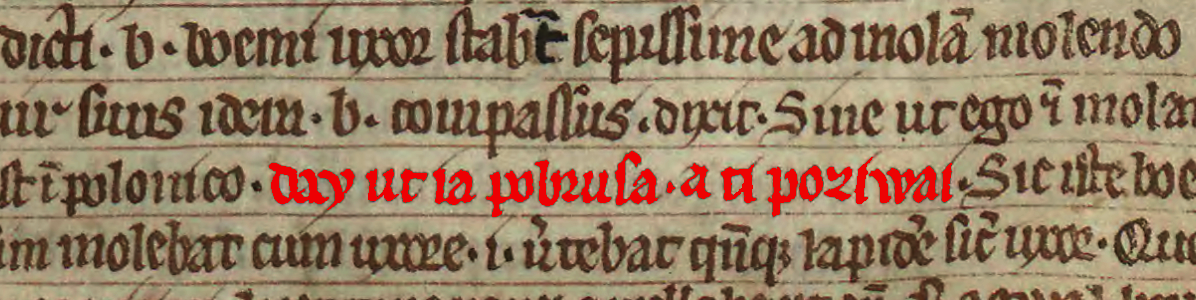
The oldest known Polish written sentence in the Book of Henryków

The first-ever granting of town privileges in Polish history happened there, when Złotoryja was granted such rights in 1211 by Henry the Bearded. Medieval municipal rights modeled after Lwówek Śląski and Środa Śląska, both established by Henry the Bearded, became the basis of municipal form of government for several cities and towns in Poland, and two of five local Polish variants of medieval town rights. In the 13th century the Book of Henryków, a chronicle containing the oldest known text in Polish, was created in the region. In the Middle Ages, gold (Polish: złoto) and silver (Polish: srebro) were mined in the region, which is reflected in the names of the former mining towns of Złotoryja, Złoty Stok and Srebrna Góra. The city of Bolesławiec is a major center of pottery production since the Middle Ages, which the tradition of production of Bolesławiec pottery, also referred to as Polish pottery, cultivated to this day.

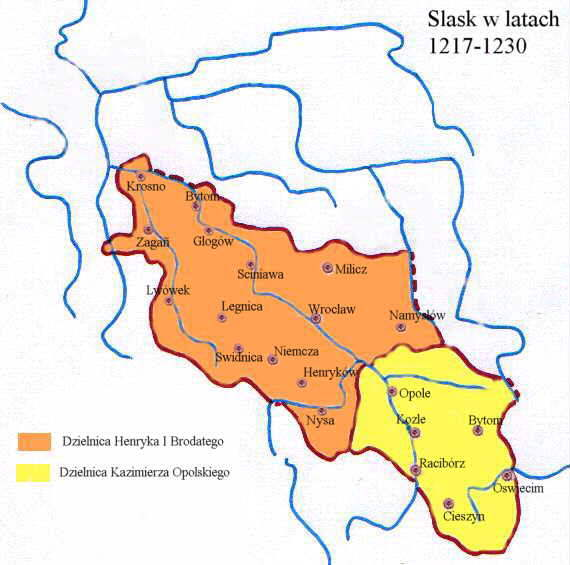
Duchy of Silesia–Wrocław under the rule of Henry I the Bearded (1201–1238)

The Duchy of Silesia was first split into lower and upper parts in 1172 during the period of Poland's feudal fragmentation, when the land was divided between two sons of former High Duke Władysław II. The elder Bolesław the Tall ruled over Lower Silesia with his capital in Wrocław, and younger Mieszko Tanglefoot ruled over Upper Silesia with his capital at first in Racibórz, from 1202 in Opole. Later Silesia was divided into as many as 17 duchies. Main duchies of Lower Silesia:

- Silesia–Wrocław
  - Legnica, split off in 1248
    - Brzeg, split off from Legnica in 1311
    - Świdnica-Jawor, split off from Legnica in 1274
      - Lwówek, split off from Świdnica in 1281
      - Ziębice, split off from Świdnica in 1321
  - Głogów, split off from Legnica in 1251
    - Żagań, split off from Głogów in 1274/1278
    - Oleśnica, split off from Głogów in 1313
      - Bierutów, split off from Oleśnica in 1412
    - Krosno-Ścinawa
  - Nysa, established in 1290

In 1319, Duchy of Jawor, the southwesternmost duchy of Lower Silesia and fragmented Poland, under Duke Henry I of Jawor, expanded westward, reaching the towns of Görlitz/Zgorzelec, Senftenberg, Zittau and Ostritz.

=== Polish duchies, Bohemian Crown, Austria, and Prussia ===
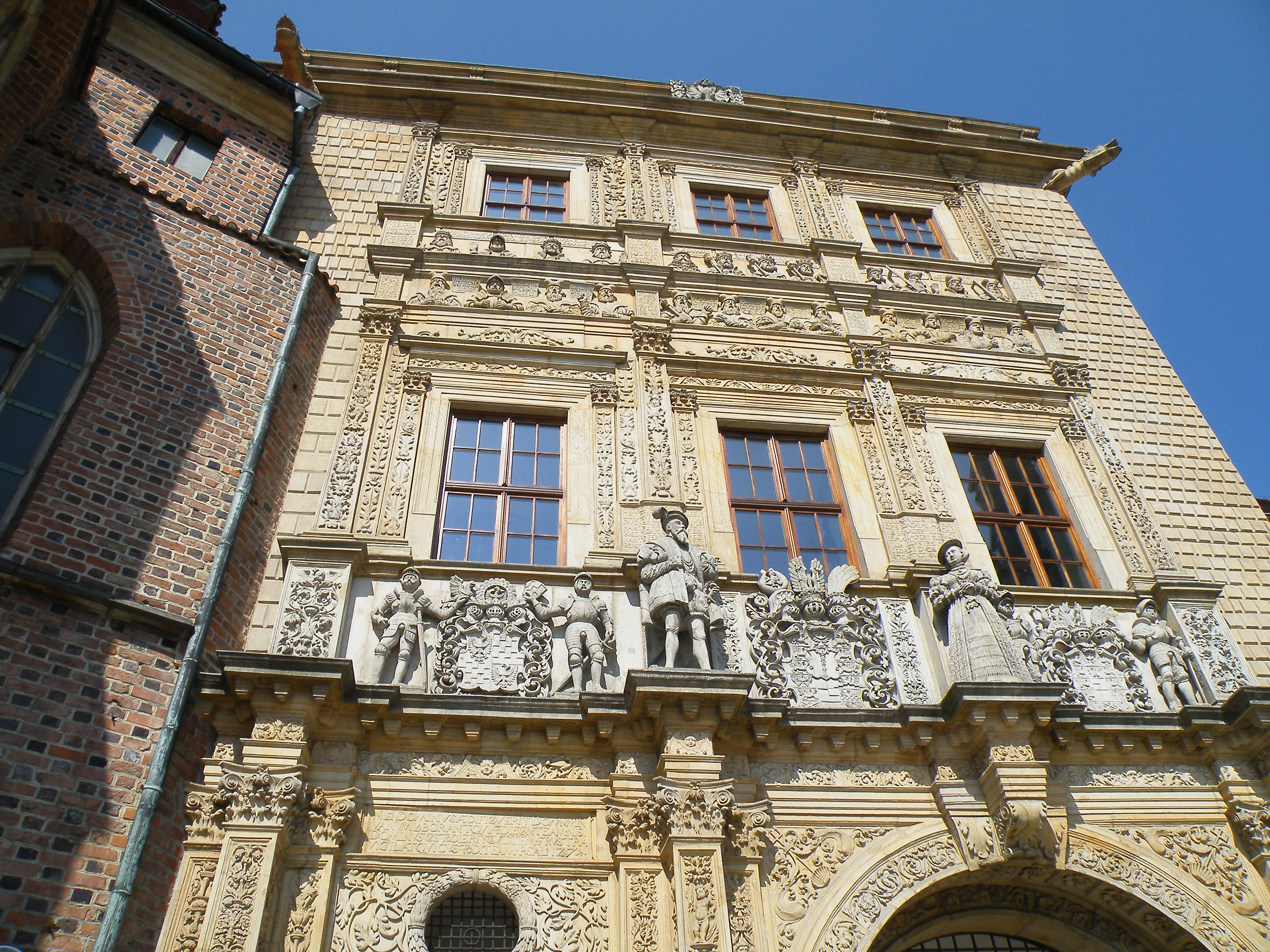
Renaissance facade of the Brzeg Castle, depicting members of the Piast dynasty, from the semi-legendary founder Piast the Wheelwright to Duke Frederick II of Legnica

With the 1335 Treaty of Trentschin (Trenčín) and the 1348 Treaty of Namysłów, most of the Silesian duchies were ruled by the Silesian Piast dukes under the feudal overlordship of the Bohemian kings, and thus became part of the Crown of Bohemia within the Holy Roman Empire, though in 1341–1356 Poland regained control of the towns of Byczyna, Kluczbork, Namysłów and Wołczyn. Many duchies remained Polish-ruled under the houses of Piast, Jagiellon and Sobieski, some up to the 17th and 18th century. In 1476, the Duchy of Crossen (Krosno) became part of the Margraviate of Brandenburg, when the widow of the Piast ruler, Barbara von Brandenburg, daughter of Elector Albert Achilles, inherited Crossen. This made the area around Schwiebus (Świebodzin) an exclave separated from the rest of Silesia. In 1475 Głogów-born Polish printer Kasper Elyan founded the Drukarnia Świętokrzyska (Holy Cross Printing House) in Wrocław, which published the Statuta synodalia episcoporum Wratislaviensium, the first incunable in Lower Silesia, which also contains the first-ever text printed in the Polish language.

As a result of the settlement of Germans and the gradual assimilation of the Slavic population, Lower Silesia had become largely German-speaking by the end of the 15th century. In 1526, the region became part of the Habsburg monarchy when Archduke Ferdinand I of Austria succeeded King Louis II of Hungary and Bohemia. Brandenburg contested the inheritance, citing a treaty made with Frederick II of Legnica, but Silesia largely remained under Habsburg control until 1742. In 1675 Duke George William of Legnica died at the Brzeg Castle, as the last male member of the Piast dynasty, which founded the Polish state in the 10th century. He was buried in Liegnitz (Legnica).

Two main routes connecting Warsaw and Dresden ran through the region in the 18th century and Kings Augustus II the Strong and Augustus III of Poland often traveled that route.

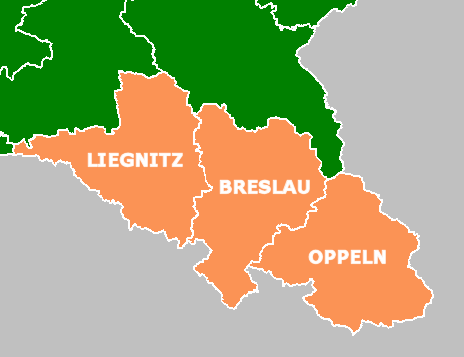
Map of the Prussian Province of Silesia, with Lower Silesian administrative regions (Regierungsbezirke) of Liegnitz and Breslau ("Middle Silesia")

Most of Lower Silesia, except for the southern part of the Duchy of Neisse, became part of the Kingdom of Prussia after the First Silesian War by the 1742 Treaty of Breslau. In 1813, several battles of the War of the Sixth Coalition were fought in the region, including the Battle of the Katzbach. In 1815, it became part of the Prussian Silesia Province, which was divided into the three Lower Silesian administrative regions (Regierungsbezirke) of Liegnitz, Breslau and Reichenbach, and Upper Silesian Oppeln (including the Lower Silesian districts of Neisse and Grottkau). Reichenbach, which covered the southern part of Lower Silesia, was dissolved and its territories split between Liegnitz and Breslau in 1820; Breslau, which thereafter covered the central part of Silesia is sometimes also referred to as Middle Silesia. The western Liegnitz region was enlarged by the incorporation of the Upper Lusatian Landkreise (districts) of Lauban (Lubań), Görlitz, Rothenburg and, after 1825, Hoyerswerda, all seized from the Kingdom of Saxony after the Napoleonic Wars, as well as some small areas transferred from Crossen (Rothenburg an der Oder, Polnisch Nettkow, Drehnow); the exclave of Schwiebus in the north, as well as few other small exclaves in the west, were transferred to Brandenburg Province. The formerly Bohemian County of Kladsko, which had been annexed along with Silesia in 1742, was attached to the Reichenbach region in 1818, becoming part of the central Breslau region upon Reichenbach's dissolution in 1820.

The Polish secret resistance movement was active in the region in the 19th century. On 5 May 1848, a convention of Polish activists from the Prussian and Austrian partitions of Poland was held in Breslau. Breslau was the seat of a Polish uprising committee before and during the January Uprising of 1863–1864 in the Russian Partition of Poland. Local Poles took part in Polish national mourning after the Russian massacre of Polish protesters in Warsaw in February 1861, and also organized several patriotic Polish church services throughout 1861. Secret Polish correspondence, weapons, gunpowder and insurgents were transported through the region. In June 1863 Breslau was officially confirmed as the seat of secret Polish insurgent authorities. The Prussian police arrested a number of members of the Polish insurgent movement.

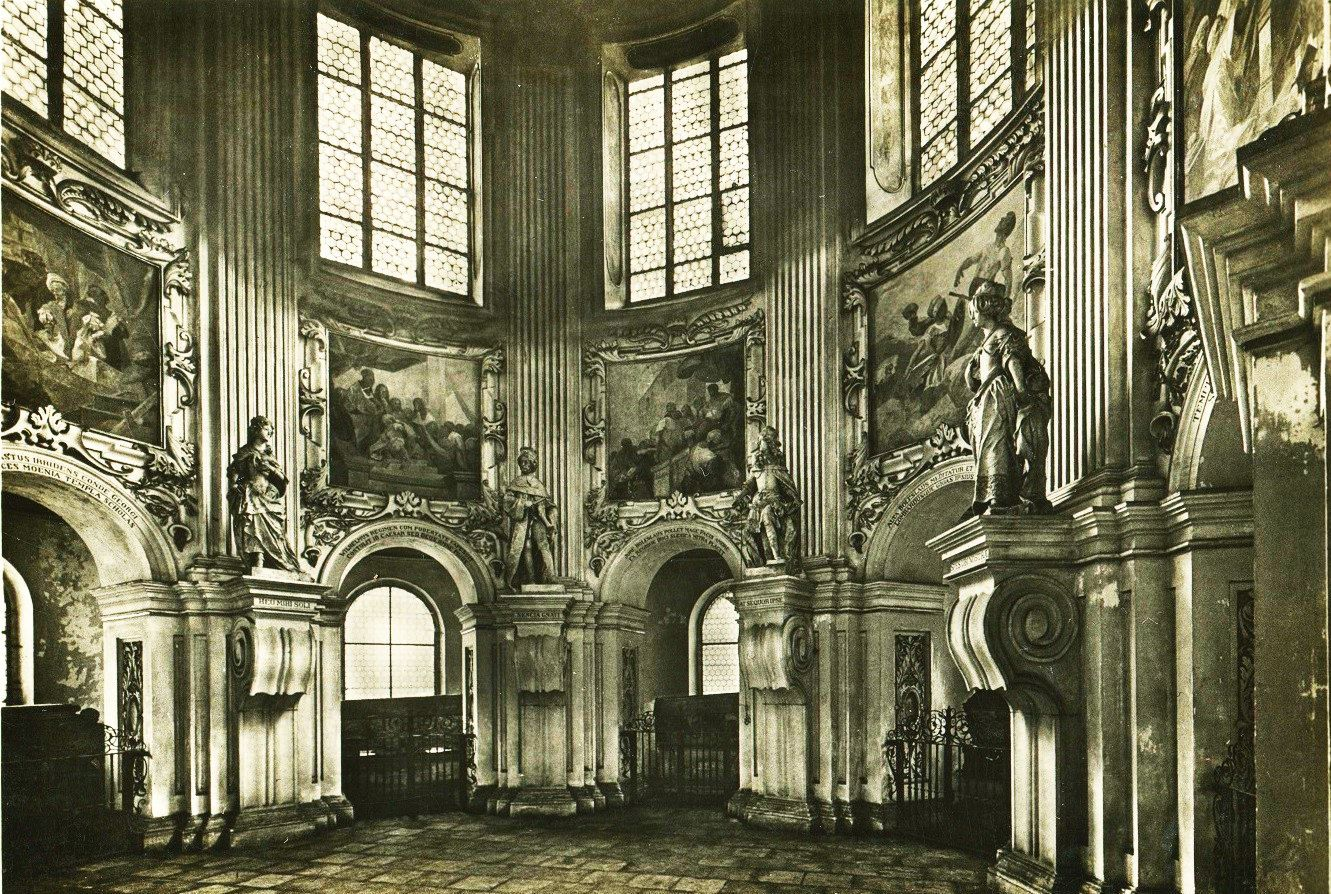
Early 20th-century view of the mausoleum of the last Piast dukes in the Church of St. John the Baptist in Legnica

With the unification of Germany in 1871 Lower Silesia became part of the German Empire. At the beginning of the 20th century Lower Silesia had a small Polish-speaking area in the northeastern part of the district of Namslau (Namysłów), Groß Wartenberg (Syców) and Militsch (Milicz) and a Czech-speaking minority in the rural area around Strehlen (Strzelin). There were also Polish communities in large cities such as Breslau (Wrocław) and Grünberg (Zielona Góra). During World War I, the German government operated at least 24 forced labour camps for Allied prisoners of war in the region.

After the war, the bulk of Lower Silesia remained within Germany, the Bohemian part was included within Czechoslovakia, and a small part with Rychtal was reintegrated with Poland, which just regained independence. The German part was re-organized into the Province of Lower Silesia of the Free State of Prussia consisting of the Breslau and Liegnitz regions. In the interwar period, there were multiple instances of anti-Polish violence in the German part, and in 1920 a Polish consulate in Breslau was attacked and demolished by German nationalists. In the 1930 German federal election, the Nazi Party achieved 24.1 % and 20.9 % respectively in the Lower Silesian administrative districts of Breslau and Liegnitz, far above the national average. In the 1930s, many place names were Germanised in order to erase traces of Polish origin, for example streets, squares, buildings and enterprises with the name Piast were forced to change their names (including the Piast castles in Brzeg and Wołów).

==== World War II ====
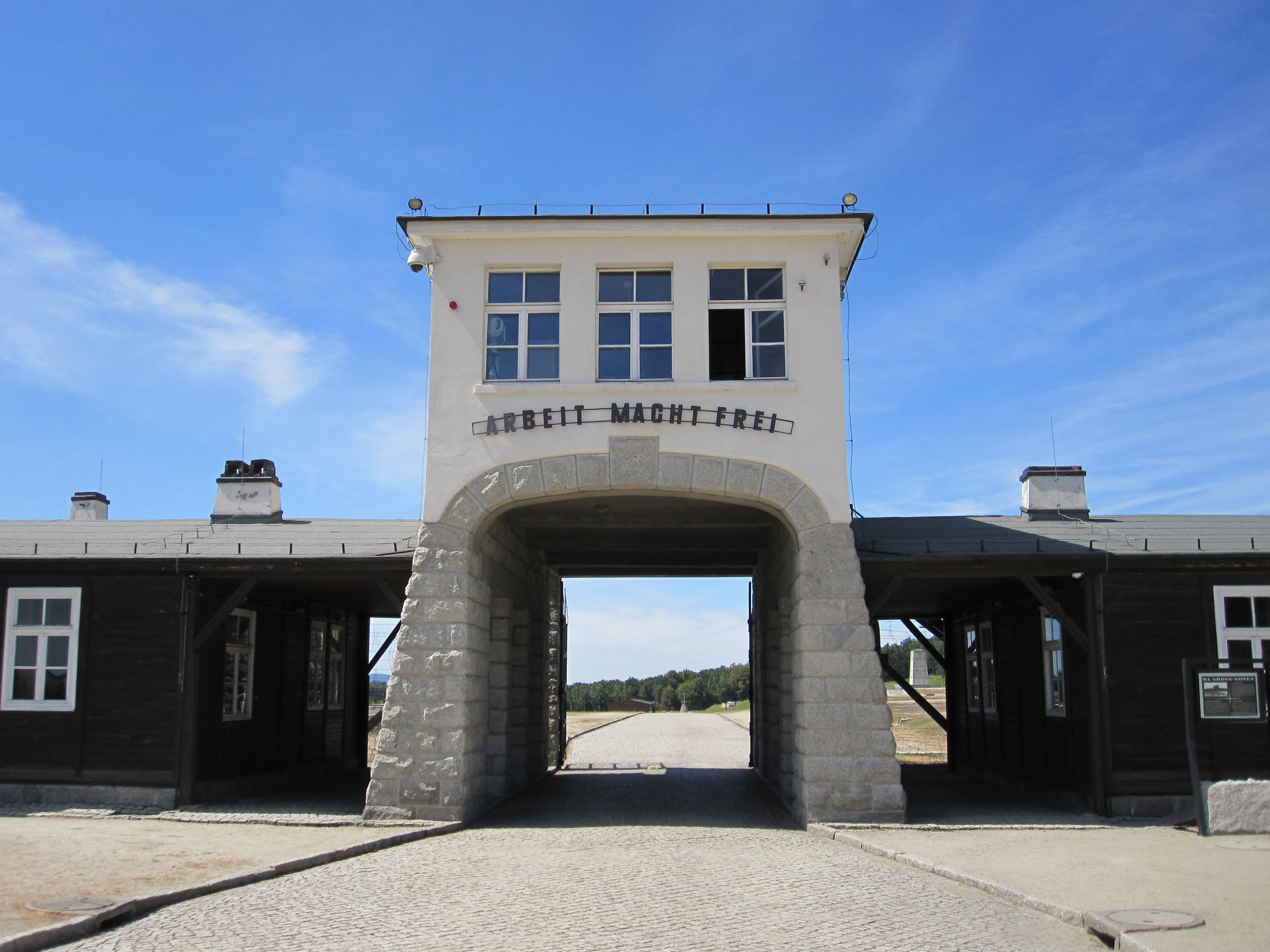
Gross-Rosen concentration camp, now a museum

In September 1939, at the start of World War II, Germany invaded and occupied the Polish part of the region. Already in 1939, the Germans carried out the first expulsions of Poles, and some died during their deportation to the more-eastern part of German-occupied Poland.

During the war, the Germans established the Gross-Rosen concentration camp with around 100 subcamps in the region, in which around 125,000 people of various nationalities, among them mostly Jews, Poles and citizens of the Soviet Union, were imprisoned, and around 40,000 died. Also several German prisoner-of-war camps, including Stalag VIII-A, Stalag VIII-C, Stalag VIII-E, Stalag Luft III, Oflag VIII-A, Oflag VIII-B, Oflag VIII-C, Oflag VIII-F, with numerous forced labour subcamps were located in the region, as well as various subcamps of the Stalag VIII-B/344 POW camp. POWs of various nationalities were held in those camps, including Poles, Frenchmen, Belgians, Britons, Italians, Canadians, Americans, Greeks, Yugoslavians, Russians, Australians, New Zealanders, South Africans, Norwegians, Lithuanians, Slovaks, etc. There were also several Nazi prisons, other forced labour camps and a camp for kidnapped Polish children up to 5 years of age, who were deemed "racially worthless" in Wąsosz, where many died. Kamieniec Ząbkowicki was the place of Aktion T4 murders of mentally ill children by involuntary euthanasia. The Project Riese construction project, which cost the lives of many forced laborers of various nationalities, was conducted by Germany in the region.

Stalag Luft III murders victims memorial in Żagań

The Polish resistance movement was active in the region, including the Home Army and Olimp organization.

In the final stages of the war it was the site of several death marches perpetrated by Germany.

Allied proposals regarding the post-war fate of Lower Silesia evolved significantly between 1944 and 1945. Early Western concepts, such as the 1944 Morgenthau Plan, envisioned partitioning the region, transferring the Breslau Regency to Poland while keeping the Liegnitz Regency within a North German state. Another British-American contingency proposal favoured a border along the Oder and the Eastern Neisse, which would have divided Wrocław itself. However, as the Soviet Union installed a communist-dominated puppet government in Poland, the Western Allies gradually scaled back their initial support for extensive territorial transfers in the west, fearing Soviet expansion into Central Europe. Consequently, a United States Department of State memorandum in May 1945 recommended keeping Lower Silesia within Germany, arguing there was "no historic or ethnic justification" for granting the area to Poland.

Despite Western diplomatic protests, Soviet authorities began transferring administrative control over Lower Silesia to the Polish administration starting in February 1945 as the Red Army advanced. At the Potsdam Conference, the Western Allies initially maintained their opposition to the Oder–Neisse line along the Lusatian Neisse and pushed for the Eastern Neisse border, while the Soviets briefly floated a compromise line along the Kwisa river before the United States and the United Kingdom ultimately conceded to the Lusatian Neisse border. These border shifts were agreed on pending a final peace conference with Germany which eventually never took place. Germany retained the small portion of the former Prussian Province of Lower Silesia to the west of the Oder–Neisse line.

=== Modern Poland ===
The remaining German population was expelled from the bulk of Lower Silesia east of the Neisse in accordance with the Potsdam Agreement. Poles from Central Poland and the Polish areas annexed by the Soviet Union came to the region.

From 1945 to 1975 Lower Silesia was administered within the Wrocław Voivodeship. As a result of the Local Government Reorganisation Act (1975), Poland's administration was reorganized into 49 voivodeships, four of them in Lower Silesia: Jelenia Góra, Legnica, Wałbrzych, and Wrocław Voivodeships (1975–1998). As a result of the Local Government Reorganisation Act of 1998, these four provinces were joined into the Lower Silesian Voivodeship (effective 1 January 1999), whose capital is Wrocław.

Following the Korean War, in 1953–1959, Poland admitted 1,000 North Korean orphans in the region.

The region has been hit by the 1997 Central European flood as well as the 2024 Central European floods.

== Population ==
At the close of the classical period the region was inhabited by Germanic Tribes, who during the Migration Period moved westward to the lands of modern Germany and France and were replaced in Lower Silesia by Lechitic tribes. Starting in the 1100s, German settlers came into Silesia at the invitation of the local Piast dukes and founded towns all over the region under German town law. Until the mid-18th century, Lower Silesia remained an ethnically and linguistically diverse region within the multi-ethnic Bohemian Crown and the Habsburg monarchy. While German-speaking populations predominated on the left bank of the Oder River following medieval Ostsiedlung, the right bank and several left-bank enclaves retained a predominantly Polish-speaking population. Following the Prussian annexation of Silesia in 1742 during the Silesian Wars, the region became subjected to systematic, state-sponsored Germanization policies. Under Frederick the Great and his successors, the Prussian administration actively restricted the use of the Polish language in schools, churches, and local governance, while promoting German settlement. Throughout the 19th century, compulsory Prussian education, military conscription, and industrialization accelerated the linguistic assimilation of the remaining Polish-speaking communities on the right bank of the Oder, transforming most of Lower Silesia into a predominantly German-speaking region by the early 20th century. In year 1819, the Breslau Regency had 833,253 inhabitants, the majority of whom—755,553 (90%)—were German-speakers; with a Polish-speaking minority numbering 66,500 (8%); as well as 3,900 Czechs (1%) and 7,300 Jews (1%). U.S. Immigration Commission in 1911 classified Polish-speaking Silesians as ethnic Poles. After World War II, German inhabitants that had not fled the area due to the war, were expelled in accordance with the Potsdam Agreement, and the region was resettled by Poles from former eastern Poland, which was annexed by the Soviet Union, as well as from other regions, making Polish minority majority again. In 1948–1954 Greeks and Macedonians, refugees of the Greek Civil War, came to Lower Silesia. They were temporarily admitted in five towns and villages in the region and afterwards finally settled in various cities and counties, although in the next decades some returned to Greece, and some emigrated to other countries. The largest Greek-Macedonian communities were located in Zgorzelec, Wrocław, Świdnica and Wałbrzych.

== Cities and towns ==
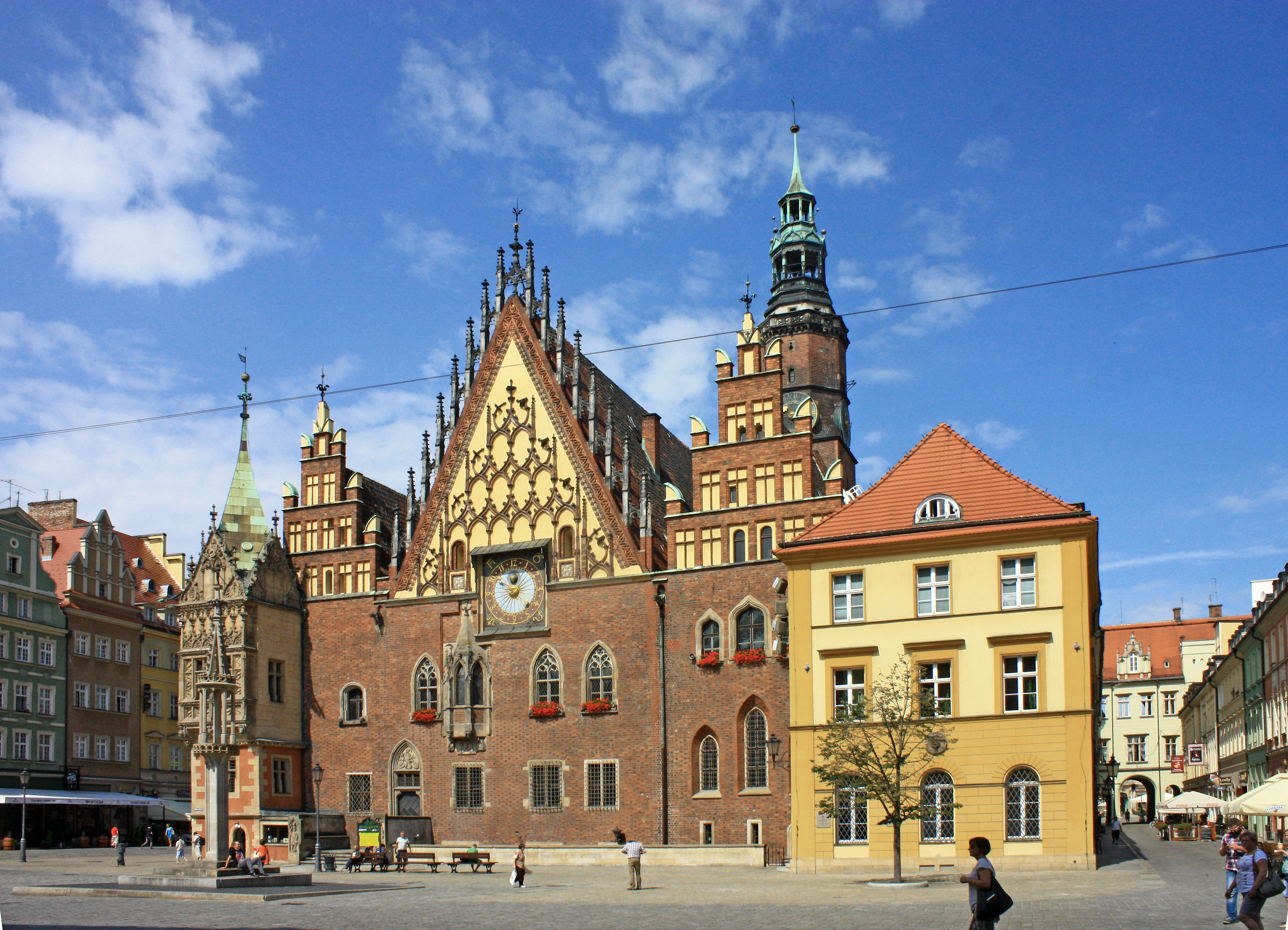
Wrocław Town Hall

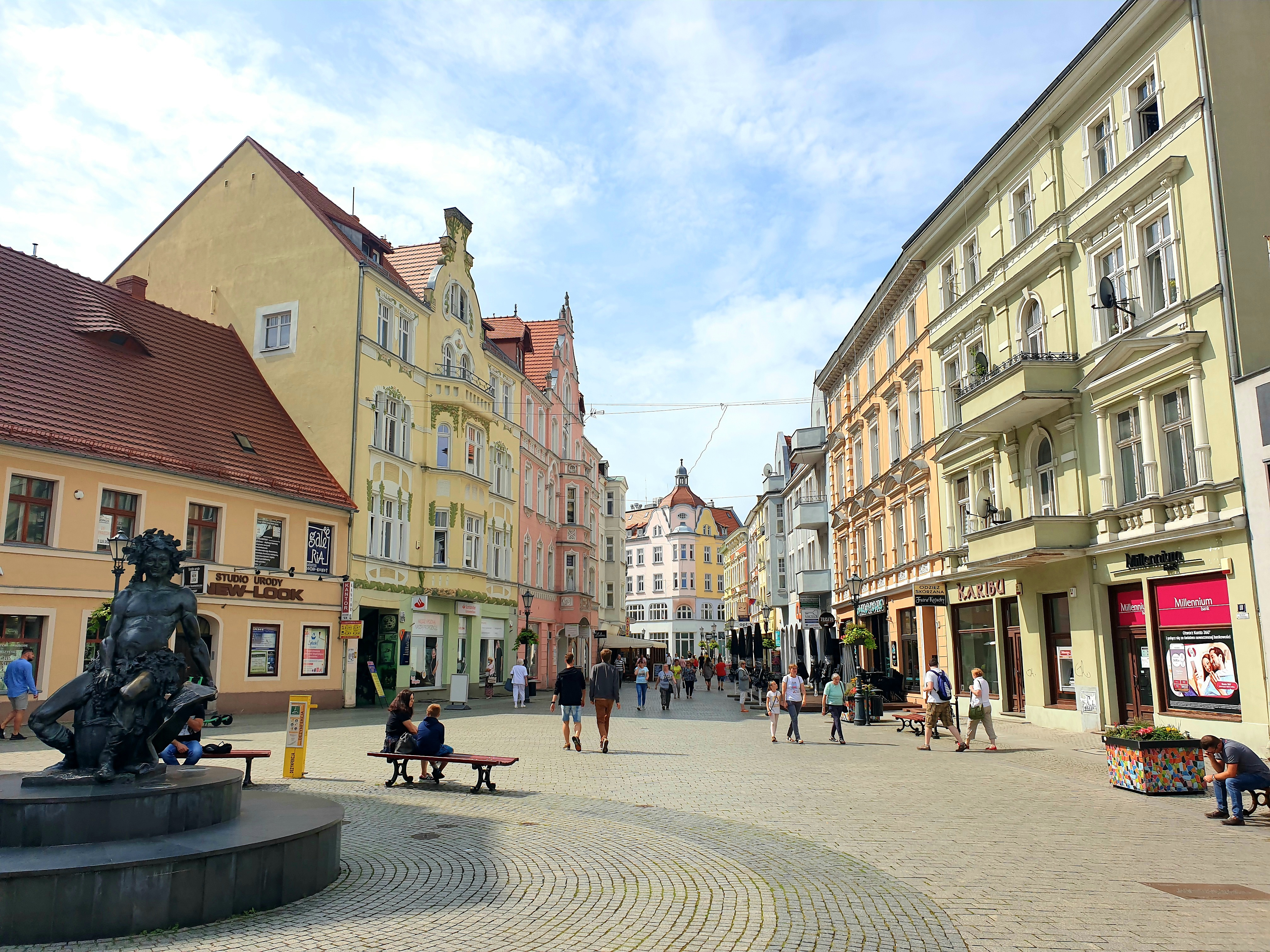
Zielona Góra

Cities and towns with over 20,000 inhabitants:

- Wrocław
- Zielona Góra
- Wałbrzych
- Legnica
- Jelenia Góra
- Lubin
- Głogów
- Świdnica
- Bolesławiec
- Nowa Sól
- Oleśnica
- Brzeg
- Dzierżoniów
- Oława
- Bielawa
- Żagań
- Jawor
- Świebodzice
- Polkowice
- Nowa Ruda
- Świebodzin
- Jelcz-Laskowice

== Silesian traditions in Upper Lusatia ==
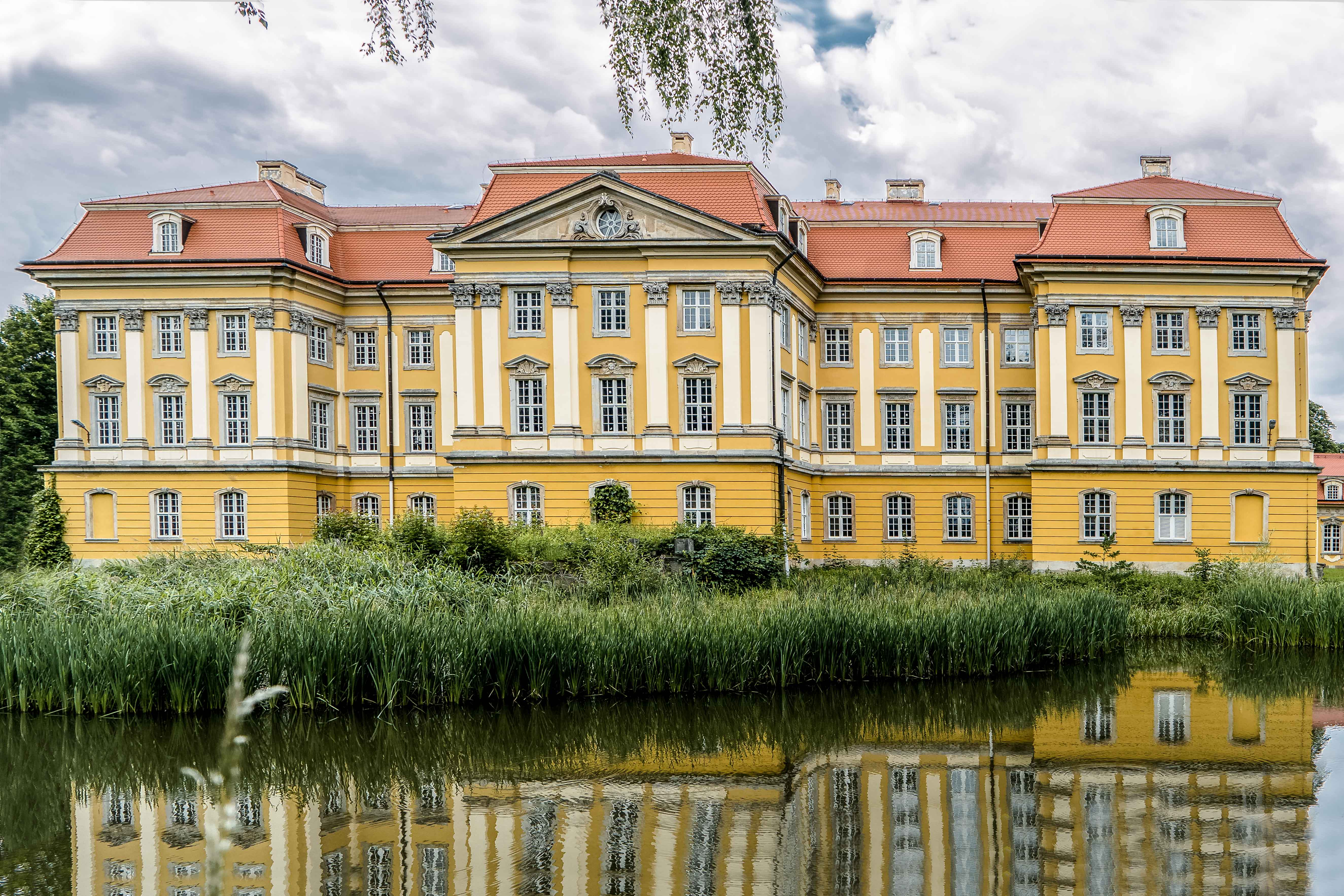
Baroque palace in Radomierzyce

Eastern parts of Upper Lusatia also formed part of Silesia in the early 14th century, as part of the Duchy of Jawor of fragmented Poland, and again from 1815 to 1945, when the area was annexed from Saxony by Prussia and included within the Province of Silesia and later of Lower Silesia. During this time Silesian culture and the Silesian German dialect spread into this region with its centre Görlitz. The expulsion of the Germans from the east of the Oder-Neisse line led to an additional settlement of German Silesians in this region.

Due to these facts, some of the inhabitants of this region still consider themselves Silesian and cultivate Silesian customs. One of their special privileges is the right to use the Lower Silesian flag and coat of arms which is guaranteed to them by the Saxon Constitution of 1992. The Evangelical Church of Silesia in Upper Lusatia, meanwhile, merged with the one of Berlin and Brandenburg to form the Evangelical Church of Berlin-Brandenburg-Silesian Upper Lusatia.

=== Towns ===
The main cities within the former province of Lower Silesia west of the Oder-Neisse line are (Upper Sorbian names in italics):

- Görlitz (Zhorjelc)
- Hoyerswerda (Wojerecy)
- Weißwasser/O.L. (Běła Woda)
- Niesky (Niska)

The main Lusatian cities within the former Duchy of Jawor and province of Lower Silesia east of Lusatian Neisse, now within Lower Silesian Voivodship are:

- Zgorzelec
- Lubań
- Bogatynia

== Transport ==
The international airport is located in Wrocław – Wrocław Airport.

The A4 motorway, A18 motorway and S3 expressway run through Lower Silesia.

Lower Silesia is home to the busiest railway station in Poland, Wrocław Główny. The dominant rail operator is Lower Silesian Railways.

== Tourism ==
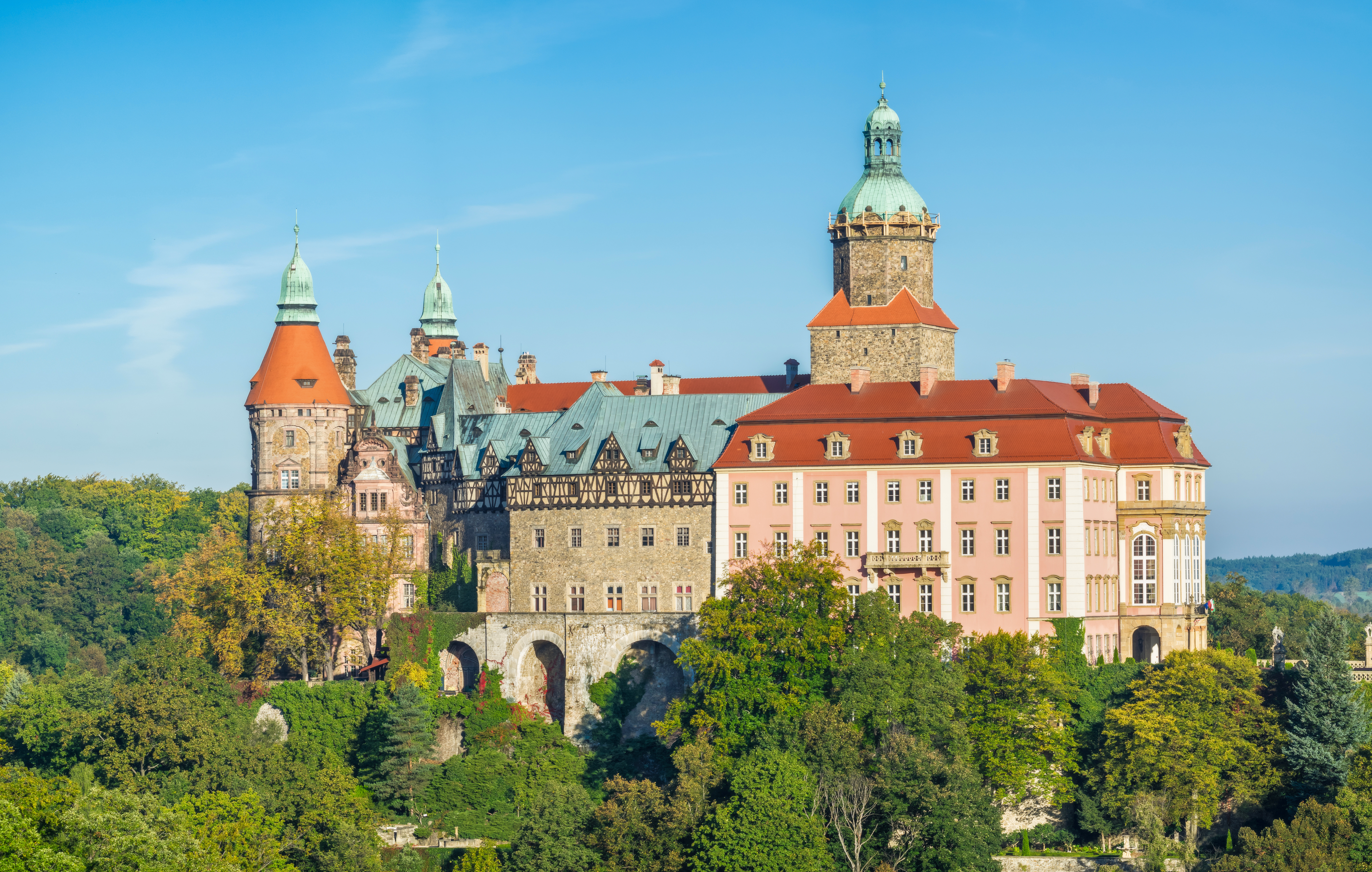
Książ

Lower Silesia is one of the most visited regions in Poland. It is famous for a large number of castles and palaces (more than 100), inter alia: Książ Castle, Czocha Castle, Grodziec Castle, Gola Dzierżoniowska Castle, Oleśnica Castle, Kamieniec Ząbkowicki Palace. There is also a lot in the Jelenia Góra valley.

The most widely visited city is Wrocław where the Festival of Good Beer is held every year on the second weekend of June.

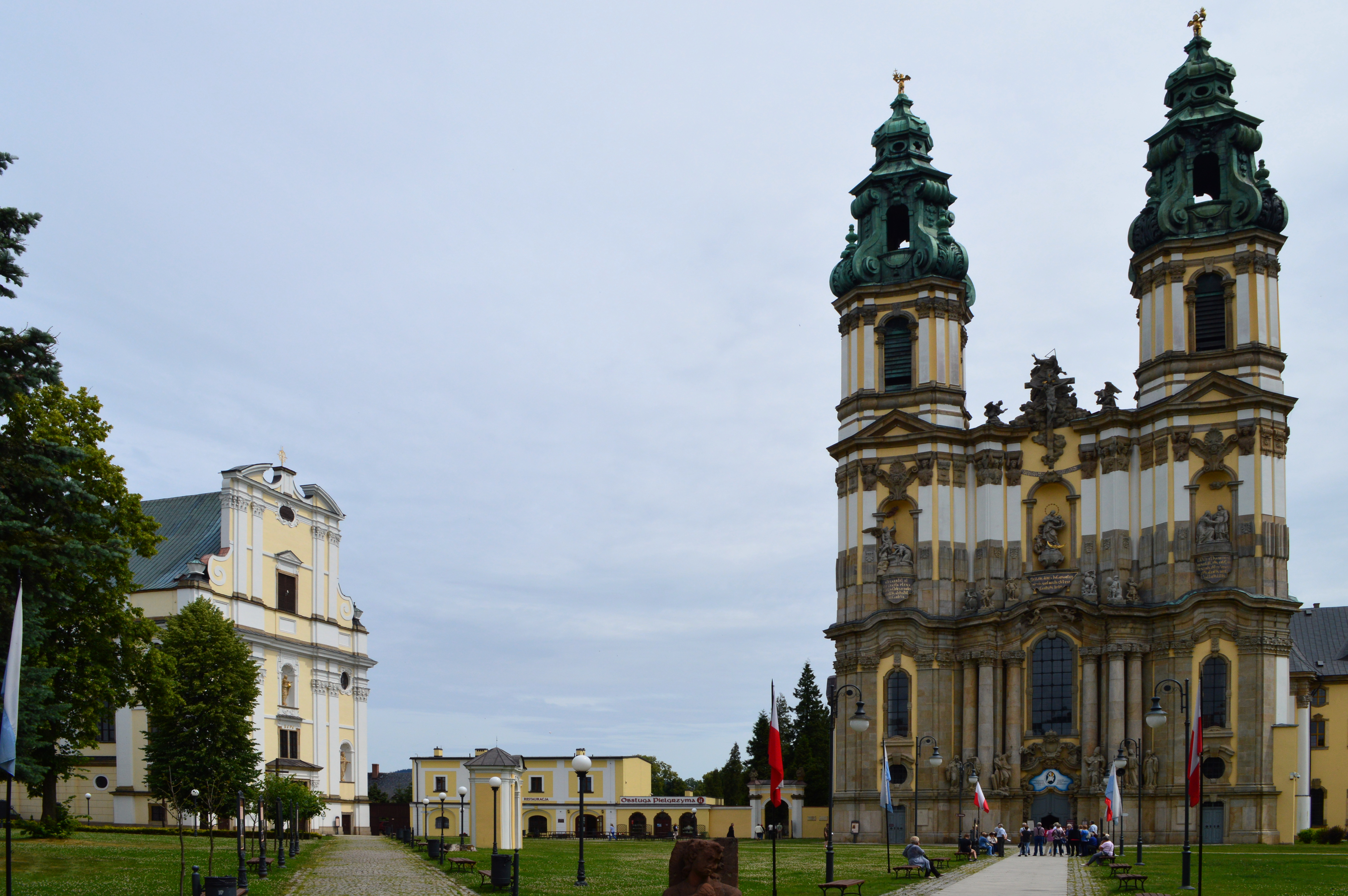
Krzeszów Abbey, a regional pilgrimage site, which houses the oldest Marian icon in Poland and one of the oldest in Europe

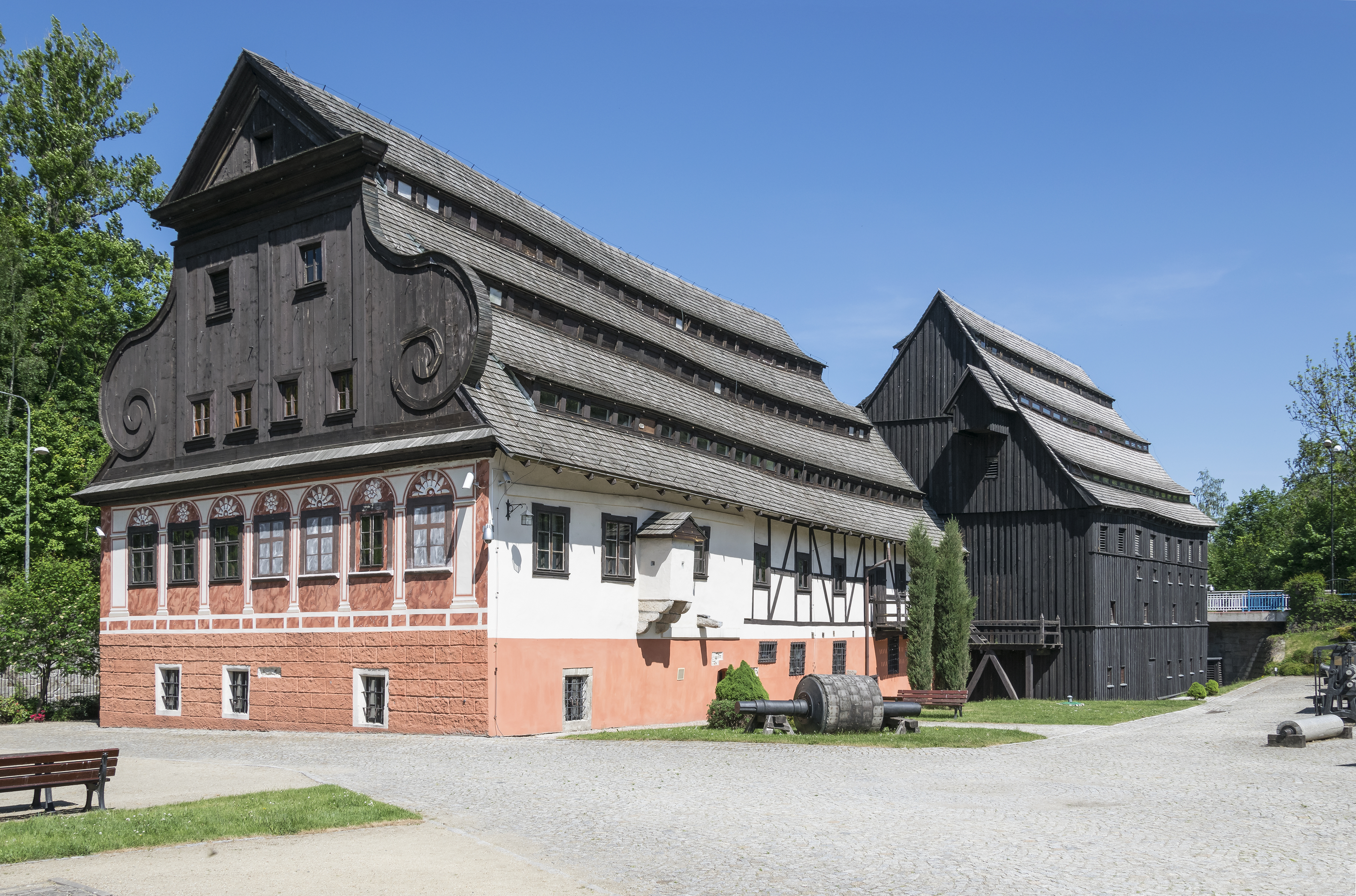
Museum of Papermaking in Duszniki-Zdrój

Lower Silesia boasts three World Heritage Sites and 22 Historic Monuments of Poland:

- Churches of Peace in Jawor and Świdnica (listed as both)
- Centennial Hall (Wrocław) (listed as both)
- Piast Castle and Gothic St. Jadwiga's Church in Brzeg, one of the burial sites of the Piast dynasty
- Museum of Papermaking in Duszniki-Zdrój
- Palace and landscape parks of the Jelenia Góra Valley
- Abbey and palace and park ensemble in Kamieniec Ząbkowicki
- Church of the Visitation of Mary in Klępsk
- Baroque Krzeszów Abbey, which hosts the Icon of Our Lady of Grace, the oldest Marian icon in Poland and one of the oldest in Europe; one of the burial sites of the Piast dynasty
- Książ Castle and Park ensemble
- Baroque Benedictine Abbey and St. Jadwiga's Basilica, Legnickie Pole
- Gothic Saint James church in Małujowice
- Gothic Basilica of St. James and St. Agnes, Nysa, one of the burial sites of the Piast dynasty
- Old Town and medieval fortifications of Paczków
- Fort Srebrna Góra
- Gothic Saints Peter and Paul Basilica, Strzegom
- Gothic Świdnica Cathedral
- Former Cistercian Abbey and Sanctuary of St. Jadwiga, Trzebnica, one of the burial sites of the Piast dynasty
- Old Town of Wrocław
- Romanesque-Gothic Saint George church in Ziębice
- Former Augustinian Abbey and Assumption of the Blessed Virgin Mary Church, Żagań, one of the burial sites of the Piast dynasty
- Gothic-Mannerist Holy Trinity church in Żórawina

There are several burial sites of Polish monarchs and dukes from the Piast dynasty, including at Brzeg, Henryków, Lubiąż, Nysa, Trzebnica, Żagań, and several in Legnica and Wrocław. The Basilica of the Assumption of the Blessed Virgin Mary in Krzeszów and Church of St. John the Baptist in Legnica contain entire Baroque mausoleums of the Piast dukes from the Świdnica and Legnica lines, respectively.

Other rather unique historic structures include the Skull Chapel in Kudowa-Zdrój and the Vang Stave Church in Karpacz. The Ducal Tower in Siedlęcin contains one of the best preserved medieval frescos in Poland, and the world's only in situ depiction of Sir Lancelot.

Other landmarks include: Kłodzko Fortress, Wambierzyce, Oleśnica Mała, Mount Ślęża, Table Mountains, Owl Mountains, Karkonosze, Main Sudetes Trail (440 km from Świeradów Zdrój to Prudnik), Barycz Valley Landscape Park.

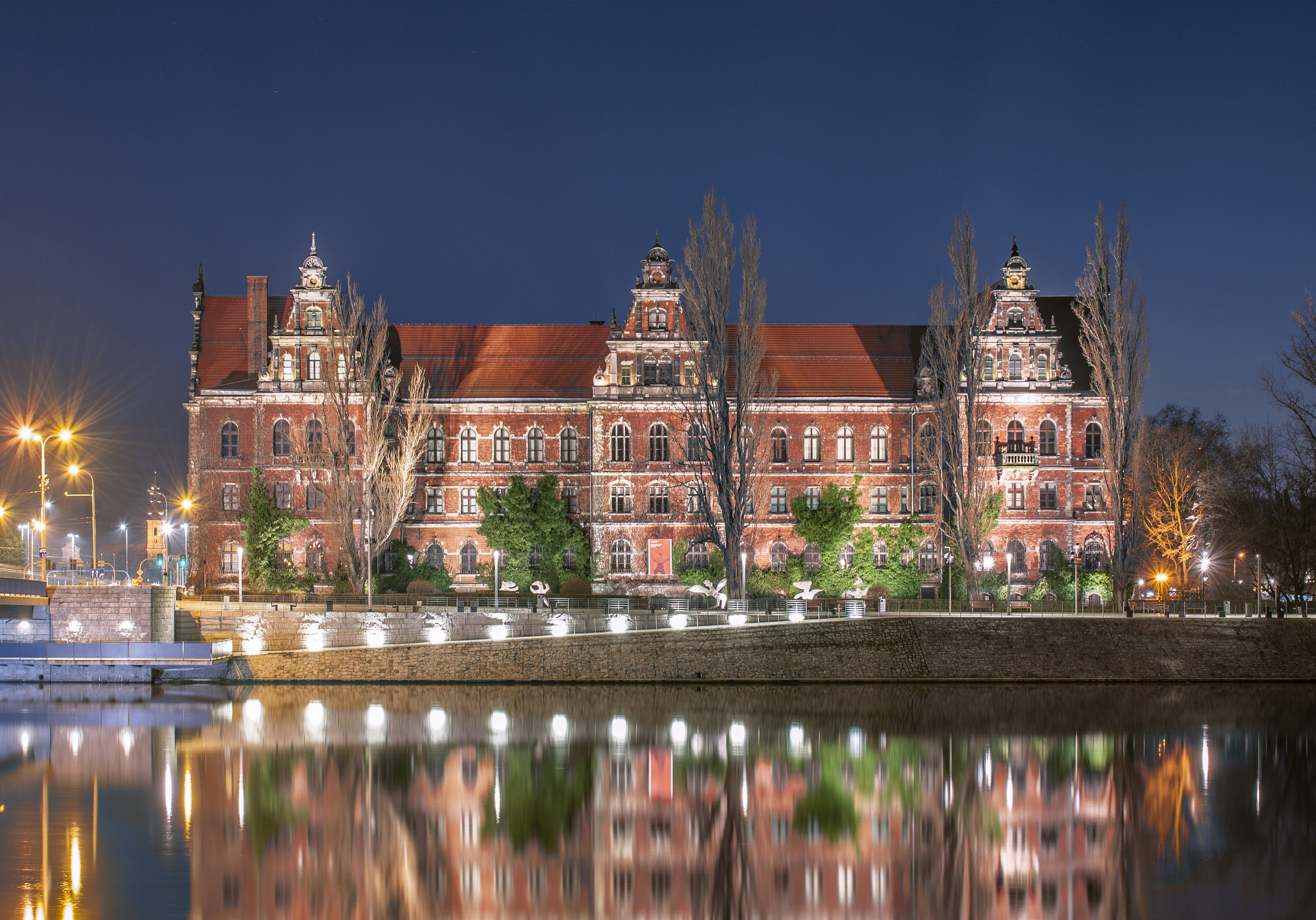
National Museum, Wrocław

There are various museums, including the major National Museum in Wrocław with the branch Racławice Panorama Museum, and the Archdiocese Museum in Wrocław, which contains the Book of Henryków. Wrocław also hosts the Post and Telecommunications Museum, Poland's chief museum dedicated to postal history. The Regional Museum in Środa Śląska holds the Środa Treasure, containing medieval gold and silver coins, jewellery and royal regalia, considered one of the most precious archaeological findings of 20th-century Europe. The Ossolineum in Wrocław is a National Institute and Library of great importance, and the Pan Tadeusz Museum, containing the manuscript of the Polish national epos, Pan Tadeusz by Adam Mickiewicz, serves as its branch. Bolesławiec, center of pottery production since the Middle Ages, hosts the Museum of Ceramics. The former gold mines in Złoty Stok and Złotoryja, tin and cobalt mine in Krobica, coal mine in Nowa Ruda and uranium ore mine in Kowary are available for tourists.

World War II sites include the museums at the former Nazi German Gross-Rosen concentration camp and Stalag VIII-C and Stalag Luft III prisoner-of-war camps, and memorials at the sites of other Nazi camps and prisons and to the Polish resistance movement, etc. A portion of the underground structures built as part of the unfinished Nazi German Project Riese is available for tourists.

The garrison town of Żagań hosts Poland's oldest monument of Wojtek, the soldier bear of the Polish II Corps, whereas Świebodzin hosts the Christ the King Statue, one of the world's tallest Christ statues.

== Cuisine ==
In addition to traditional nationwide Polish cuisine, Lower Silesia has its own regional and local traditional foods and beverages, which include especially various meat products (incl. various types of kiełbasa), cheeses, honeys, beverages and various dishes and meals, officially protected by the Ministry of Agriculture and Rural Development of Poland.

Notable centers of traditional meat production include the Giant Mountains and Sudetes Foothills, the towns of Niemcza, Sława and Rychtal, and villages around Nowe Miasteczko and Żagań, whereas centers of traditional cheese and quark production include the Central Sudetes, Siedlisko, Kamienna Góra and Zgorzelec.

A plethora of traditional Polish honey is produced in various places, especially in the Sudetes, Sudetes Foothills, Barycz River Valley, Lower Silesian and Stobrawa forests and Sulechów-Zielona Góra region.

There is a rich variety of breads, pastries and cakes, and additionally traditional local types of gingerbread are baked in Oleśnica, Przemków and Zielona Góra.

Lower Silesia is one of the wine growing regions of Poland, with one of the leading centers of Polish wine production being Zielona Góra. Other recognized traditional beverages include the Karkonoski Liqueur from the Giant Mountains, Trzebnicki Cider from the Trzebnickie Hills, Jarzębiak, a Polish fruit vodka made from rowan berries and other fruit ingredients, produced in Zielona Góra, and beer from Lwówek Śląski and Zielona Góra.

The village of Gościęcice has one of the largest sweet chestnut crops in Poland. Their cultivation dates back to the Middle Ages, when local Catholic monks used these chestnuts for medical purposes.

== Sport ==
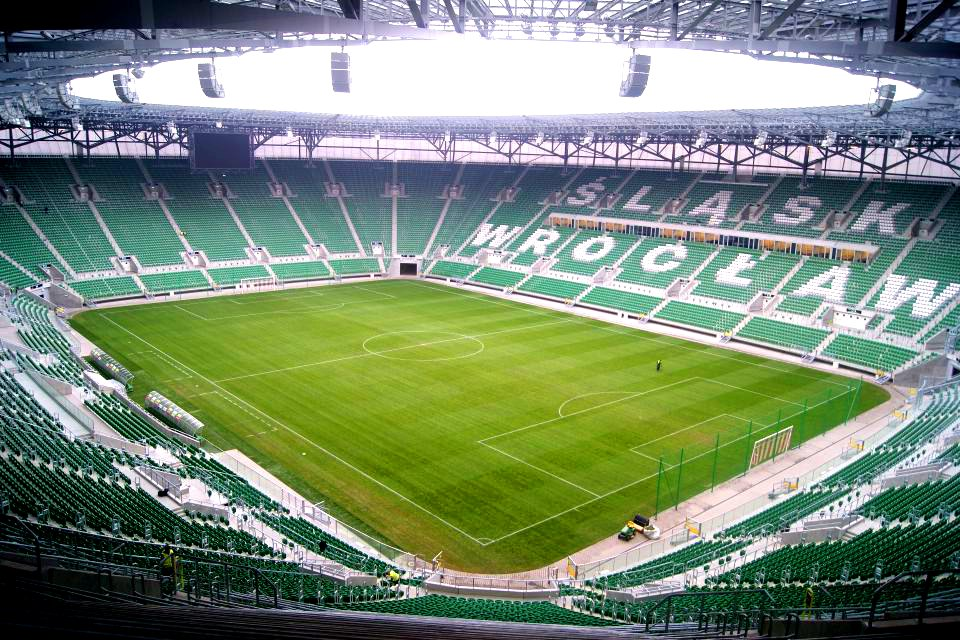
Stadion Miejski (Wrocław)

Among the most accomplished sports clubs in Lower Silesia are football clubs Śląsk Wrocław, Zagłębie Lubin and Miedź Legnica, speedway clubs Falubaz Zielona Góra and Sparta Wrocław, basketball clubs Śląsk Wrocław, Basket Zielona Góra, Górnik Wałbrzych and handball club Śląsk Wrocław.

Every year in September, Wrocław Marathon is organized.

Various major international sports competitions were held in the region, including the EuroBasket 1963, EuroBasket 2009, 2009 Women's European Volleyball Championship, 2010 Acrobatic Gymnastics World Championships, UEFA Euro 2012, 2014 FIVB Volleyball Men's World Championship, 2016 European Men's Handball Championship, 2017 World Games.

== See also ==
- Lower Silesian Railways
- Izera railway
- Niederschlesischer Oberlausitzkreis
- Niederschlesische Verkehrsgesellschaft
- Silesia Walls
- Chrobry fortified village in Szprotawa
- Project Riese

== Sources ==
- Urbanek M., (2003), Dolny Śląsk. Siedem stron świata., MAK publishing, Wrocław, p. 240 + CD-ROM
- Śląsk na weekend – touristic guide, Pascal publishing
