= List of castles and palaces in Jelenia Góra valley =

This is a list of castles, palaces and manors in Jelenia Góra valley and the surrounding area.

- Chojnik castle ruin (German: Kynast) near Sobieszów – formerly Count of Schaffgotsch
- Stara Kamienica castle ruin (German: Kemnitzburg) – original family seat of the Count of Schaffgotsch
- castle ruin (German: Lausepelz) near Rybnica
- castle ruin (German: Bolzenschloss) near Janowice – formerly Count of Stolberg-Wernigerode
- castle ruin (German: Molkenschloss) near Dąbrowica
- castle ruin (German: Falkenstein) near Karpniki
- Siedlçin castle (German: Boberröhrsdorf) – formerly comital manor Schaffgotsch family
- Plakowice palace (German: Plagwitz) near Lwówek Sląski – Renaissance palace, now sanatorium
- Wleń palace (German: Lähn) – now private
- Wleński Gródek castle ruin and palace (German: Lehnhaus)
- Nielestno palace (German: Waltersdorf) – formerly Count of Reden, now hospital
- Czernica palace (German: Langenau) – now private
- Maciejowiec palace (German: Matzdorf) – palace and manor, ruinous
- Barcinek manor (German: Berthelsdorf) – ruinous
- Dziwiszów palace and manor (German: Berbisdorf) – manor, ruinous
- Grabary manor (German: Hartau) – ruinous
- palace (German: Paulinum) in Jelenia Gora – built by family Kramst, now hotel
- Czarne palace (German: Schwarzbach) in Jelenia Gora – Renaissance palace, now ecological center
- Dąbrowica palace (German: Eichberg) – ruinous
- Łomnica palace (German: Lomnitz) – great palace and widow palace with park, now cultural center and palace hotel of family von Küster
- Wojanów palace (German: Schildau) – former comital palace Wied, princess Louise of the Netherlands, renovated 2007
- Bobrów palace (German: Boberstein) – ruinous
- Mysłakowice palace (German: Erdmannsdorf) – palace and church by Karl Friedrich Schinkel, park by Peter Joseph Lenné, owner August Neidhardt von Gneisenau and Frederick William III of Prussia, now school
- Milków palace (German: Arnsdorf) – formerly Counts of Schmettau and Count Matuschka–Topolczan, now palace hotel
- castle ruin (German: Galgenberg) (478 m) near Dolny Sciegny
- Trzcińsko palace (German: Rohrlach) – demolished
- Miedzianka palace (German: Kupferberg) – demolished
- Maciejowa palace (German: Maiwaldau) – demolished
- Janowice palace (German: Jannowitz) – formerly Counts of Stolberg–Wernigerode
- Mniszków Dwor manor (German: Waltersdorf) near Janowice
- Radomierz manor (German: Seiffersdorf) – ruinous
- Komarno palace (German: Kammerswaldau) – moated castle
- Karpniki palace (German: Fischbach) – moated castle with park, formerly prince Wilhelm I. of Hessen-Darmstadt, now private
- Bukowiec palace (German: Buchwald) – formerly Countess von Reden, now academy, with park und Belvedere
- Kowary palace (German: Neuhof bei Schmiedeberg) – formerly von Reuß-Köstritz, now private
- Kowary palace (German: Ruhberg in Schmiedeberg) – Palais Radziwill, princess Radziwill and prince Wilhelm I., now clinical center
- Staniszów palace and manor (German: Stonsdorf) – formerly von Reuss Junior Line, now palace hotel, manor demolished
- castle ruin (German: Heinrichsburg) near Sosnówka – artificial ruin, formerly von Reuß
- Podgórzyn manor (German: Nieder-Giersdorf) – demolished
- Sobieszów palace (German: Hermsdorf) – formerly Count of Schaffgotsch
- Pakoszów palace (German: Wernersdorf)
- Cieplice Sląski Zdrój (German: Bad Warmbrunn) – palace Count of Schaffgotsch and Zietenschloss, formerly Hans Ernst Karl von Zieten)
