= Church of St. John the Baptist, Legnica =

Church of St. John the Baptist
- Kościół św. Jana Chrzciciela
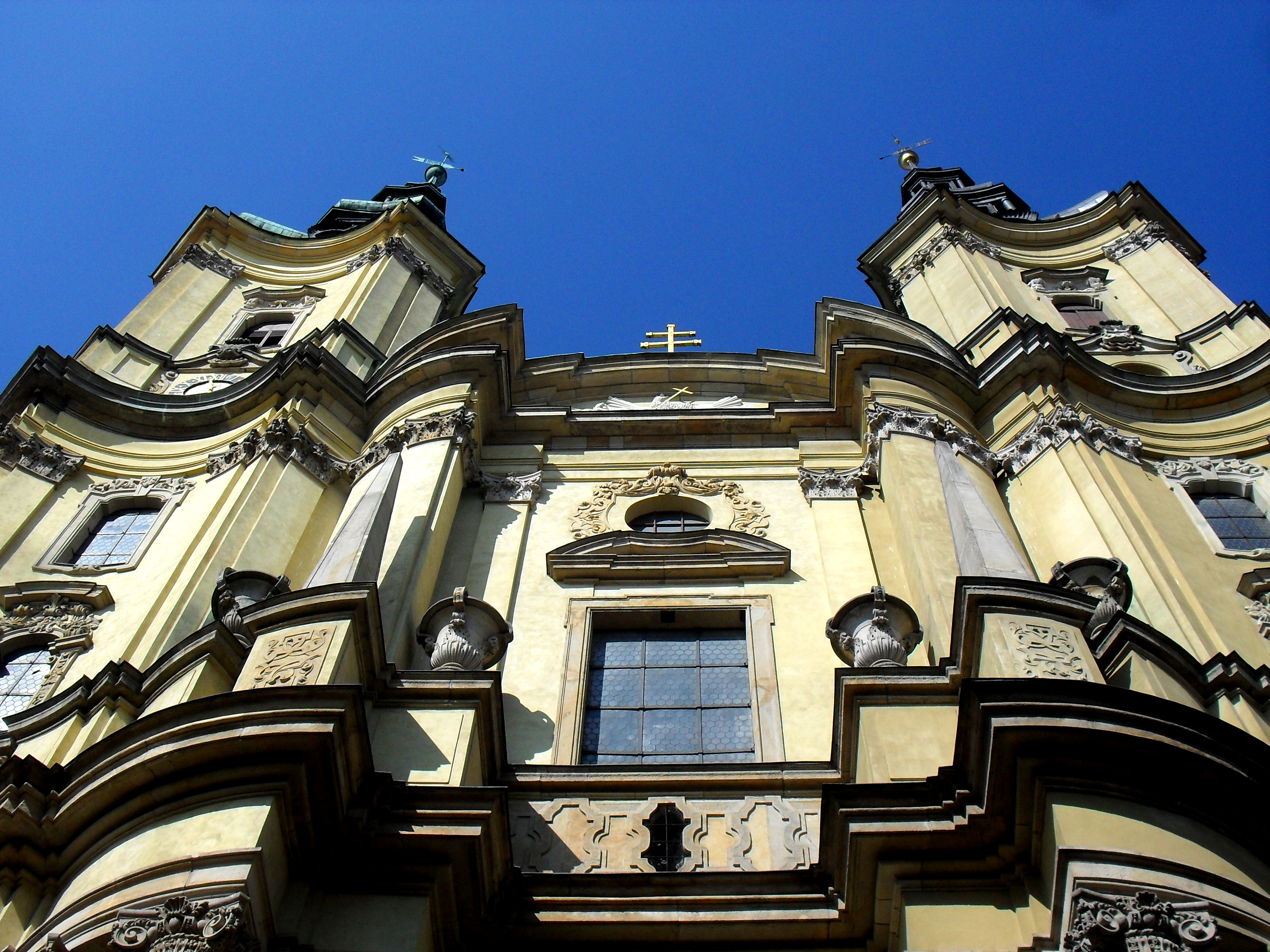
- Façade

- 51°12′32″N 16°09′31″E
- Location: Legnica
- Country: Poland
- Language: Polish
- Denomination: Catholic

History
- Status: Parish church
- Founded: 11th century
- Dedication: John the Baptist

Architecture
- Functional status: Active
- Heritage designation: Cultural heritage site
- Designated: 23 September 1960
- Style: Baroque

Administration
- Diocese: Legnica
- Deanery: Legnica Zachód
- Parish: Parish of St. John the Baptist in Legnica

The Church of St. John the Baptist in Legnica is a Baroque church in Legnica, Poland, built in the first half of the 18th century.

== History ==
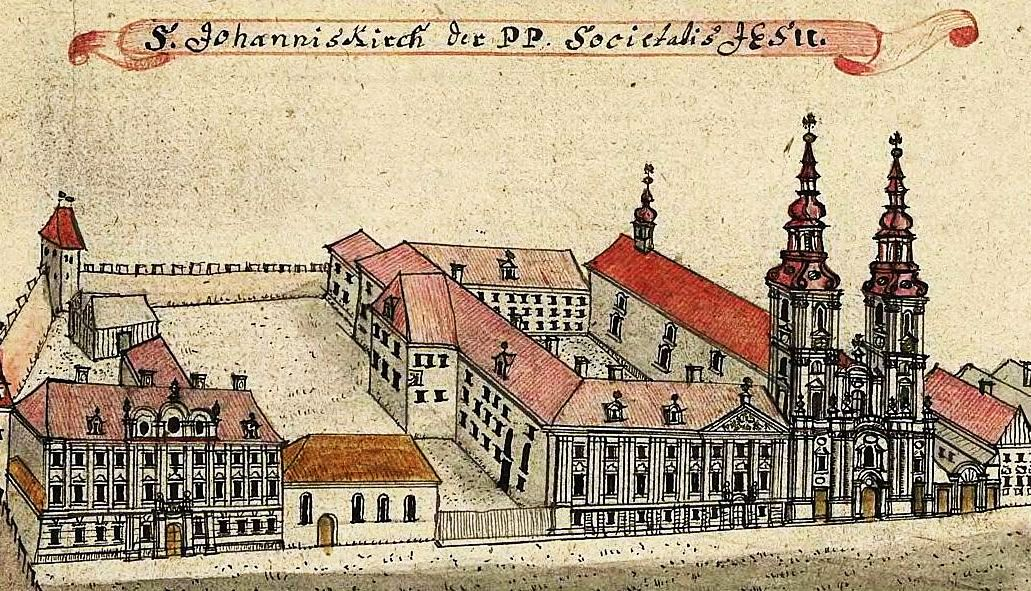
Church of St. John the Baptist and the Jesuit College c. 1750–1775

The origins of the church go back to the times of King Casimir the Restorer. By 1284 the church already belonged to the Franciscans. The construction of a brick temple, founded by Duke Henry V the Fat and the Legnica townspeople, began in 1294. The building was enlarged around 1341 thanks to the support of Wenceslaus I of Legnica. In 1522 the church was seized by Protestants. From 1548 it was a burial (court) church where corpses and tombstones of dukes from other Legnica churches, demolished in 16th century, were moved. Starting from 1566 it served as a Calvinist church, due to the last Silesian Piasts accepting this confession. In 1677–1679, the church's presbytery was converted into a family mausoleum by Duchess Louise of Anhalt-Dessau, the mother of the last Silesian Piast, George William.

During the Counter-Reformation, the building was given to the Jesuit Order, which built its college on the west side between 1700 and 1706. In 1714 the old church was demolished due to its poor structural condition. Only the presbytery with the Piast mausoleum was preserved. The present temple was built in the years 1714–1727 on the site of the old church.

The building was part of the Jesuit college building complex in the 18th century. It was severely damaged in 1744, when the roof structure and the nave vault collapsed as a result of errors during construction works. Rebuilt in the beginning of the 19th century, it served as a temple of the Roman Catholic parish in Legnica. In 1947 it was handed over, together with the adjacent monastery, to the Franciscan Order, which repaired the World War II damage. The church was damaged by fire in 1966 - the helmet of the western tower burned down (it was rebuilt in 1978). It was thoroughly renovated in the 1960s and 1970s. In 1969 a bigger sacristy was added from the west side, while in 1979 its interior was renovated. In the years 1981-1982 the elevation was renovated and the roof was covered with copper sheet.

== Description ==
A baroque church founded on a rectangular plan. With a monumental two-tower facade on the south side and a semicircular apse on the north. The length of the church's interior is 60 meters, its width is about 30 meters, the height of the nave about 25 meters.

The interior of the church has a hall layout with rows of chapels open to the inside. The main neo-Renaissance altar dates back to 1880–1881. It is supplemented with statues and sculptures from the 18th century. The side altars in the chapels come from the former Bernardine and Benedictine monastery churches in Legnica. The baroque pulpit dates back to the 18th century; the organ to 1858; and the baptistery to 1912. A former presbytery of the Gothic Calvinist church adjoins the eastern wall of the church. Since the 16th century it served as the necropolis of the Piasts, and in the years 1677-1679 was rebuilt, thanks to Louise of Anhalt, into a mausoleum of the last dukes of Legnica-Brzeg.
