= Łomnica Palace =

Stately home in Lower Silesia, Poland

Coordinates: 50.8766°N 15.8087°E

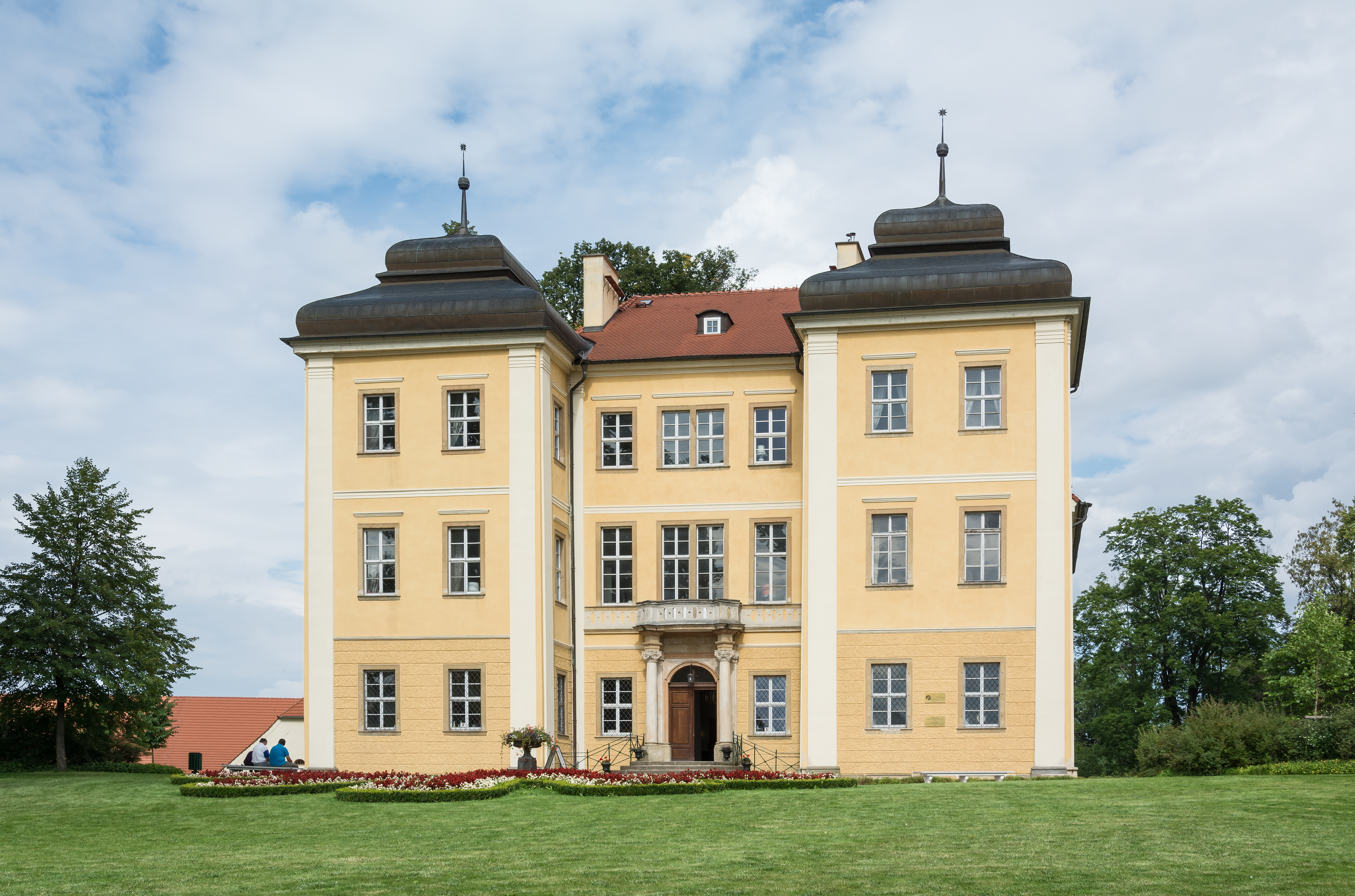
Łomnica Palace – façade

The Łomnica Palace is a Baroque palace from the 17th century with a separate residential building, the so-called "Widow's House", located in the northern part of Łomnica, at the separation of roads to Karpniki and Wojanów, about five kilometers from Jelenia Góra.

== History of the Palace and the "Widow's House" ==
The first information about the Łomnica estate comes from the years 1475–1654. At that time, the estate belonged to the von Zedlitz family. Between 1654 and 1737 it was owned by the Tomagnini family and from the third quarter of the 17th century until 1811 by the Menzl family. The Łomnica estates were then in the hands of the Flach and von Roth families until in 1835 Carl Gustaw von Küster bought the estate.

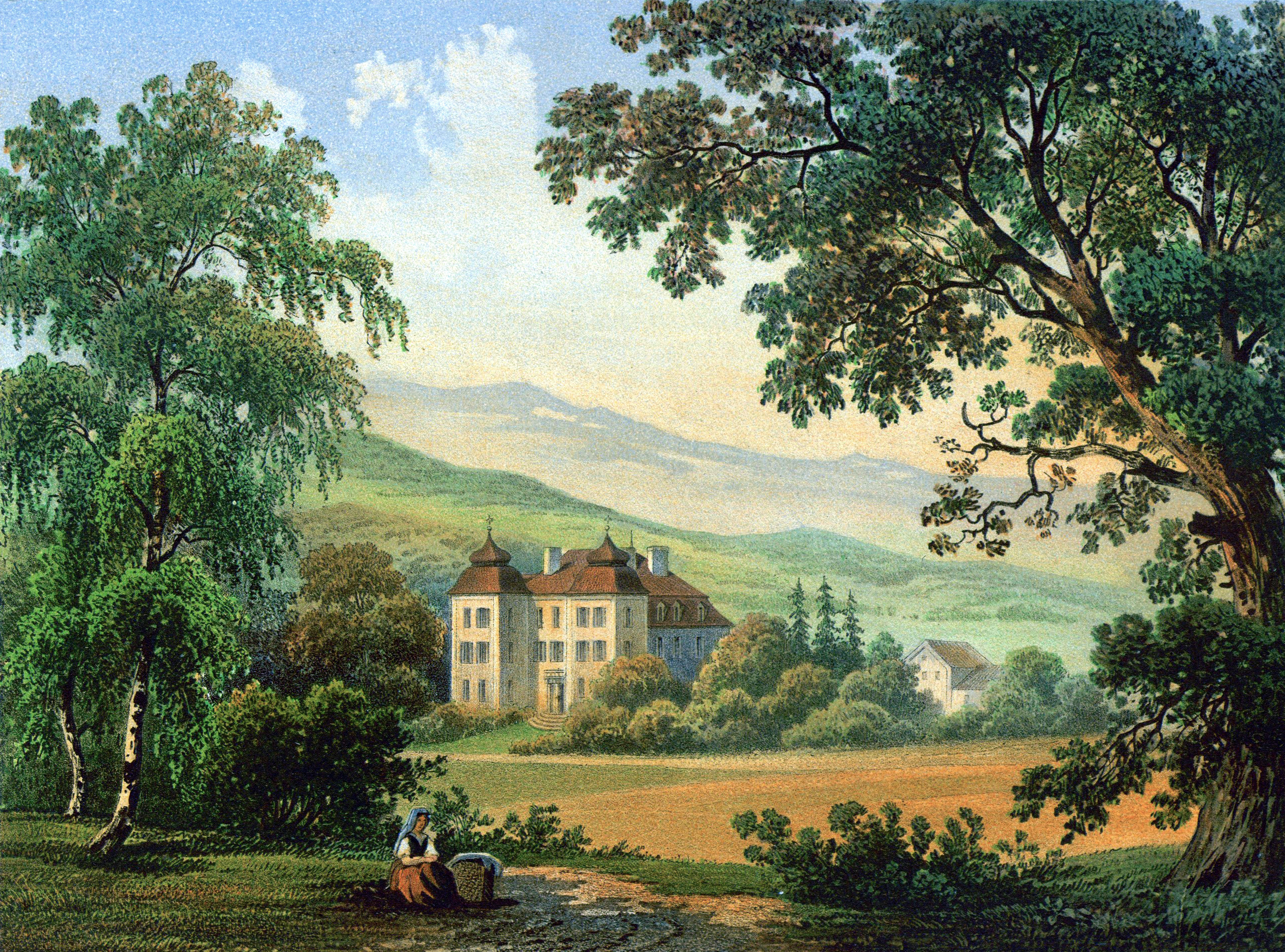
Palace in the 19th century

The early Baroque manor house was built around the second half of the 17th century. The main body and two corner alcoves date back to this period. In the 1820s, during a reconstruction, changes were made to the appearance of the façade and the interior. The reconstruction project is attributed to Martin Franz of Reval. The most significant changes in the appearance of the building were made in the years 1838-1844 by Albert Tollberg. Changes were made to the layout of rooms, a representative staircase was erected, new storeys were built and window openings were enlarged. After World War II, the palace was taken over by the Polish state. A school was located in the palace until 1977. Since the end of the 1970s, it has been abandoned and fell into ruin. In 1992, the palace was bought by a Polish-German partnership, which began renovation works.

The "Widow's House" mansion was built between 1803 and 1804 by Christian Gottfried Mentzel. The building was intended for an elderly member of the von Menzel family. After the war, the house was used for residential purposes. Currently the building houses a hotel, a restaurant and a café.

The farm complex located next to the palace now serves as a commercial and catering facility (flax products, regional products, bakery, restaurant, blacksmith shop).

The Łomnica Palace belonged to:

- the von Zedlitz family - 1475-1654
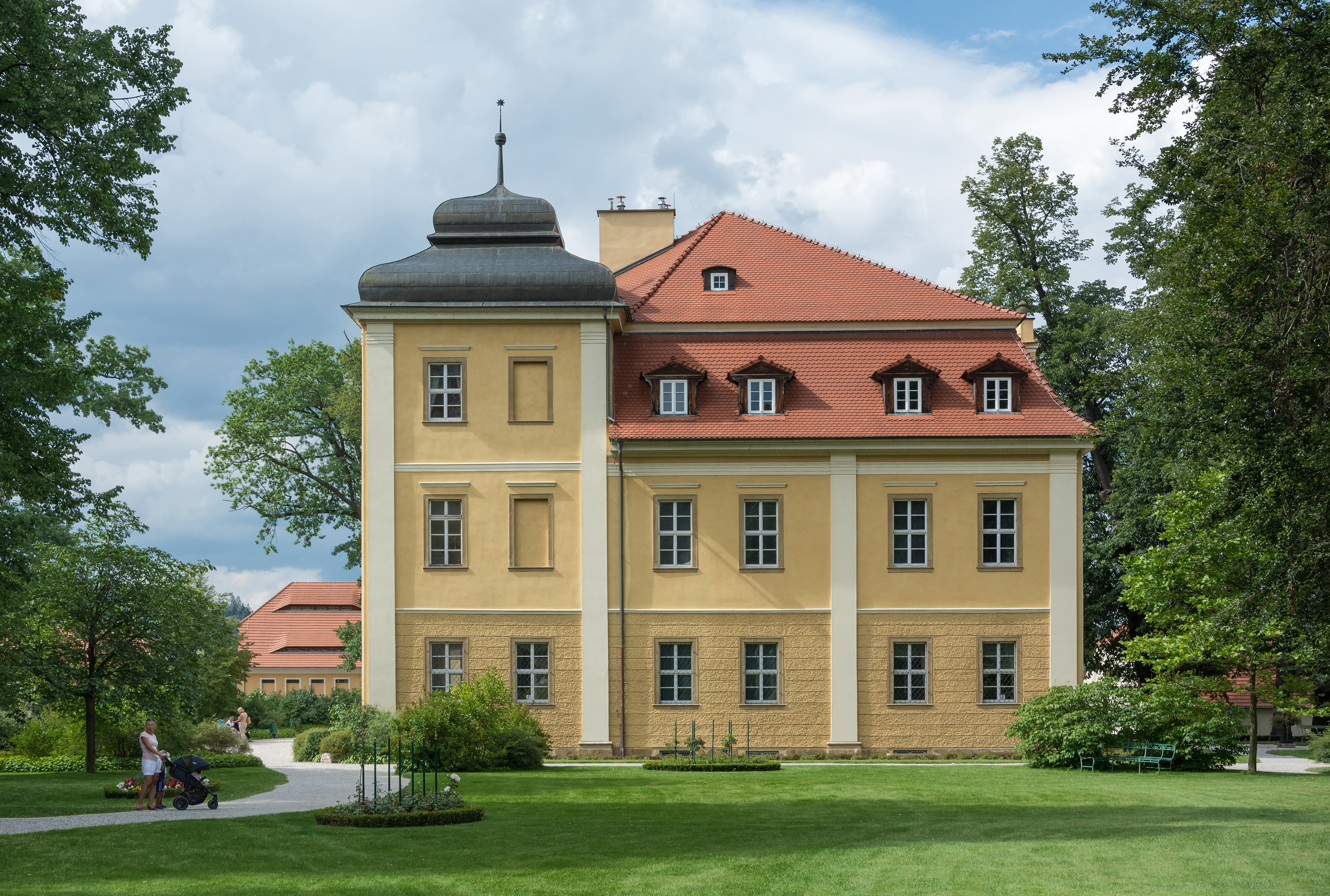
- View from southeast
  the von Tomagnini family - 1654-1737
- Christian Mentzel, a merchant from Jelenia Góra, 1737-1811
- Johann Georg Flack of Kowary - 1811-1820
- Baron Moritz von Roth - 1820-1835
- the von Küster family - 1835-1945
- the Polish state - 1945-1992
- currently in private hands (Elisabeth von Küster)

== Description of the palace and the "Widow's House" ==
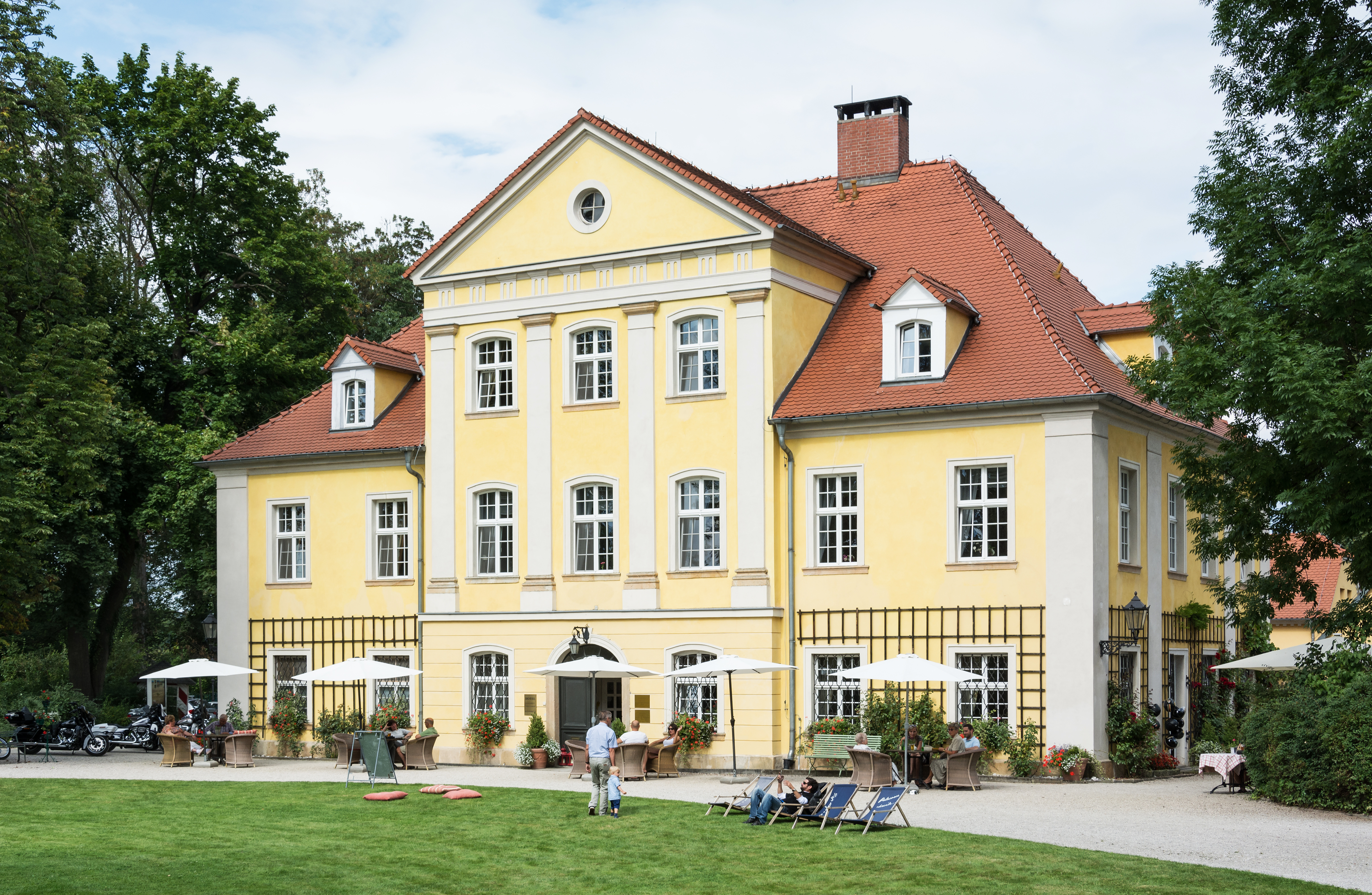
The "Widow's House"

The palace is a three-storey building built on a square plan with corner alcoves and avant-corps) (Risalite) in the façade. The alcoves are covered with flattened cupolas, the main body of the palace with a hipped roof. A balcony portal is located centrally in the façade. The palace's interior layout has not changed. Large fragments of wall paintings from the early 18th century and the 19th century have survived in the rooms on the first floor. The palace serves as a museum of the interiors.

The "Widow's House" mansion, currently used as a hotel, is a Neoclassical building erected on a rectangular plan, 2-storeyed, covered with a hipped roof. Higher pseudo-risalite are situated on the northern and southern sides. The interior has two sections which preserve the original layout of the rooms.

== Bibliography ==
- Alexander Duncker: Die ländlichen Wohnsitze, Schlösser und Residenzen der ritterschaftlichen Grundbesitzer in der preussischen Monarchie nebst den Königlichen Familien-, Haus-Fideicommiss- und Schatull-Gütern in naturgetreuen, künstlerisch ausgeführten, farbigen Darstellungen nebst begleitendem Text, 1857–1883
- Arne Franke et al.: Das Tal der Schlösser und Gärten. Berlin/Jelenia Gora 2003
- Arne Franke: Das schlesische Elysium. Potsdam 2004
- Romuald Łuczyński: Zamki, dwory i pałace w Sudetach. Legnica: Stowarzyszenie „Wspólnota Akademicka”, 2008 ISBN 9788389102638
- Zabytki sztuki w Polsce: Śląsk. Warszawa: Krajowy Ośrodek Badań i Dokumentacji Zabytków, 2006., 2005, p. 543 ISBN 8392290615
- Wojciech Kapałczyński, Piotr Napierała: Zamki, pałace i dwory Kotliny Jeleniogórskiej. Wrocław: Fundacja Doliny Pałaców i Ogrodów Kotliny Jeleniogórskiej, 2005, pp. 94–102 ISBN 8392292219
- Wojciech Kapalczynski: Burgen, Schlösser und Herrenhöfe im Hirschberger Tal. Jelenia Gora 2005
