= Niederschlesische Verkehrsgesellschaft =

German bus operating company

Niederschlesische Verkehrsgesellschaft (NVG)
- Headquarters: Heinrich-Heine-Straße 75, 02943 Weißwasser, Germany
- Owners: 85 % Transdev GmbH, 15 % Landkreis Görlitz
- Website: www.nvg-bus.de

NVG's old logo to 2015

The Niederschlesische Verkehrsgesellschaft ("Lower Silesian Transport Company") or NVG operated bus services as a subcontractor of Regionalbus Oberlausitz in the area of the former Niederschlesischer Oberlausitzkreis in the county of Görlitz until the end of 2017. The company's registered office is in Weisswasser.

== General ==
NVG is 85% owned by Transdev GmbH and 15% by the district of Görlitz. In addition to the Weißwasser plant, there was also a plant in Görlitz. Some lines ran as far as the county of Spree-Neisse and Bautzen. There was also a cross-border bus route from Görlitz to Zgorzelec in Poland. The tariffs of the Zweckverband Verkehrsverbund Oberlausitz-Niederschlesien (ZVON) applied to all lines. On line 259, the VVO tariff was also applied on the section between Neustadt and Hoyerswerda or Schwarze Pumpe.

== History ==
In 1962, passenger transport was managed by VEB Kraftverkehr Bautzen ("Bautzen Transport") with a branch in Görlitz. In the following year, the branch office in Görlitz was spun off from the VEB Kraftverkehr Bautzen and merged with VEB Güterkraftverkehr ("Logistics"), which had existed since 1957, and Spedition Görlitz ("Görlitz Haulage"). The company was later renamed VEB Kraftverkehr Görlitz. In 1971, VEB Kraftverkehr Görlitz became a combine in the newly formed VEB Kraftverkehrskombinat Dresden ("Dresden Transport Combine"). From 1982 to 1990 the Görlitz Tramway also belonged to Kraftverkehr Görlitz. After 1990, the company became Görlitztransport, and on 1 April 1992, public transport was spun off from Görlitztransport and Verkehrsgesellschaft Görlitz-Niesky (VGN) was founded. The vehicles have also been constantly renewed since 1992, so that just three years later the last Ikarus bus was taken out of service. As a result of the Saxon district reforms of 1994/1996, the county of Lower Silesian Upper Lusatia (Niederschlesischer Oberlausitzkreis) was formed. This now held 100% of Verkehrsgesellschaft Görlitz-Niesky (VGN) and about 30% of the Verkehrsgesellschaft Spree-Elster (VSE), the later Verkehrsgesellschaft Schwarze Elster (today Verkehrsgesellschaft Hoyerswerda). In 1995, the county council decided to set up its own transport company. This resulted in the spin-off of the Weißwasser branch of the VSE and its incorporation into the VGN in 1996. In May 1996 the process was completed and the Niederschlesische Verkehrsgesellschaft was founded. Even after that, one could still see the affiliations of the service area to the VSE or VGN from the different appearance of the stop signs. In 2001, the new Görlitz depot on Nikolaus-Otto-Straße was put into operation. In 2005, after a Europe-wide tender, Connex, later Veolia Verkehr, today Transdev, took over 85% of the shares.

Due to the steady decline in population, numerous bus routes were discontinued or the route changed during the 1990s. Since 2004, only one of the former three city bus lines has operated in Weißwasser.

At the beginning of 2012, the NVG routes were put out to tender by the county of Görlitz throughout the EU. The NVG lines were won by the Regionalbus Oberlausitz, which took over the route network in the northern part of Görlitz county on 1 January 2013. The NVG was now active as a subcontractor for the Regionalbus Oberlausitz with only about half the employees. The five-year subcontractor agreement expired on 31 December 2017. It was not extended and the bus service was discontinued. Half the previous journeys of the NVG were taken over by the Kraftverkehrsgesellschaft Dreiländereck. Since January 2018, the remaining trips have been partially carried out by Regionalbus Oberlausitz itself and other subcontractors.
