= Eisenberg =

Eisenberg is a German name in geography and a surname. Literally translated it means ″iron mountain″. Eisenberg may refer to:

== Mountains ==
- Eisenberg (Knüll), a mountain in Hesse
- Eisenberg (Korbach), a mountain in Hesse
- Eisenberg (Ore Mountains), a mountain in Saxony

== Populated places ==
=== In Germany ===
- Eisenberg, Thuringia, a town in the Saale-Holzland district, Thuringia
- Eisenberg, Rhineland-Palatinate, a town in the Donnersbergkreis, Rhineland-Palatinate
- Eisenberg (Verbandsgemeinde), a collective municipality in the Donnersbergkreis, Rhineland-Palatinate
- Eisenberg, Bavaria, a municipality in the district of Ostallgäu in Bavaria
- Eisenberg Castle, Korbach, Hesse, former seat of the House of Waldeck

=== In Austria ===
- Eisenberg an der Raab, a town in Burgenland.
- Deutsch Schützen-Eisenberg, a municipality in Burgenland.

=== in Poland ===
- Eisenberg, Kreis Sprottau/Schlesien, today Rudawica
- Eisenberg, Kreis Heiligenbeil/Ostpreußen, today Żelazna Góra
- Eisenberg, Kreis Strehlen/Schlesien, today Żeleźnik

=== In the Czech Republic ===
- Eisenberg, Eisenberg an der March, Nieder Eisenberg, previous German names of Ruda nad Moravou in Moravia
- Jezeří Castle (German: Schloss Eisenberg), Most District

== Other uses ==
- Eisenberg (surname)
- Eisenberg Paris

== See also ==
- Eisenberger
- Heisenberg
- Isenberg
- Vashegy (disambiguation), a Hungarian place name corresponding to the German Eisenberg, for some of which Eisenberg is an exonym
