= Muchowiec (disambiguation) =

Muchowiec may refer to the following places in Poland:

- Muchowiec, a district of the city of Katowice
- Muchowiec, a village in Strzelin County, Lower Silesian Voivodeship (SW Poland)
