= Heisenberg (disambiguation) =

Werner Heisenberg (1901–1976) was a German theoretical physicist and one of the key pioneers of quantum mechanics.

Heisenberg also may refer to:

== People ==
- Benjamin Heisenberg (born 1974), German film director and screenwriter, son of Martin Heisenberg
- Carl-Philipp Heisenberg (born 1968), German biologist
- Heisenberg, an anonymous lyricist working in Indian films
- Jochen Heisenberg (born 1939), German physicist, son of Werner Heisenberg
- August Heisenberg (1869–1930), German historian, father of Werner Heisenberg
- Martin Heisenberg (born 1940), German neurobiologist and geneticist, son of Werner Heisenberg

== Eponyms ==
- Heisenberg, criminal pseudonym of Breaking Bad protagonist Walter White
- Heisenberg (play), 2015
- Asteroid 13149 Heisenberg
- List of things named after Werner Heisenberg

== See also ==
- Eisenberg (disambiguation)
- Hessenberg (disambiguation)
