= Chociwel, Lower Silesian Voivodeship =

Chociwel
- Village
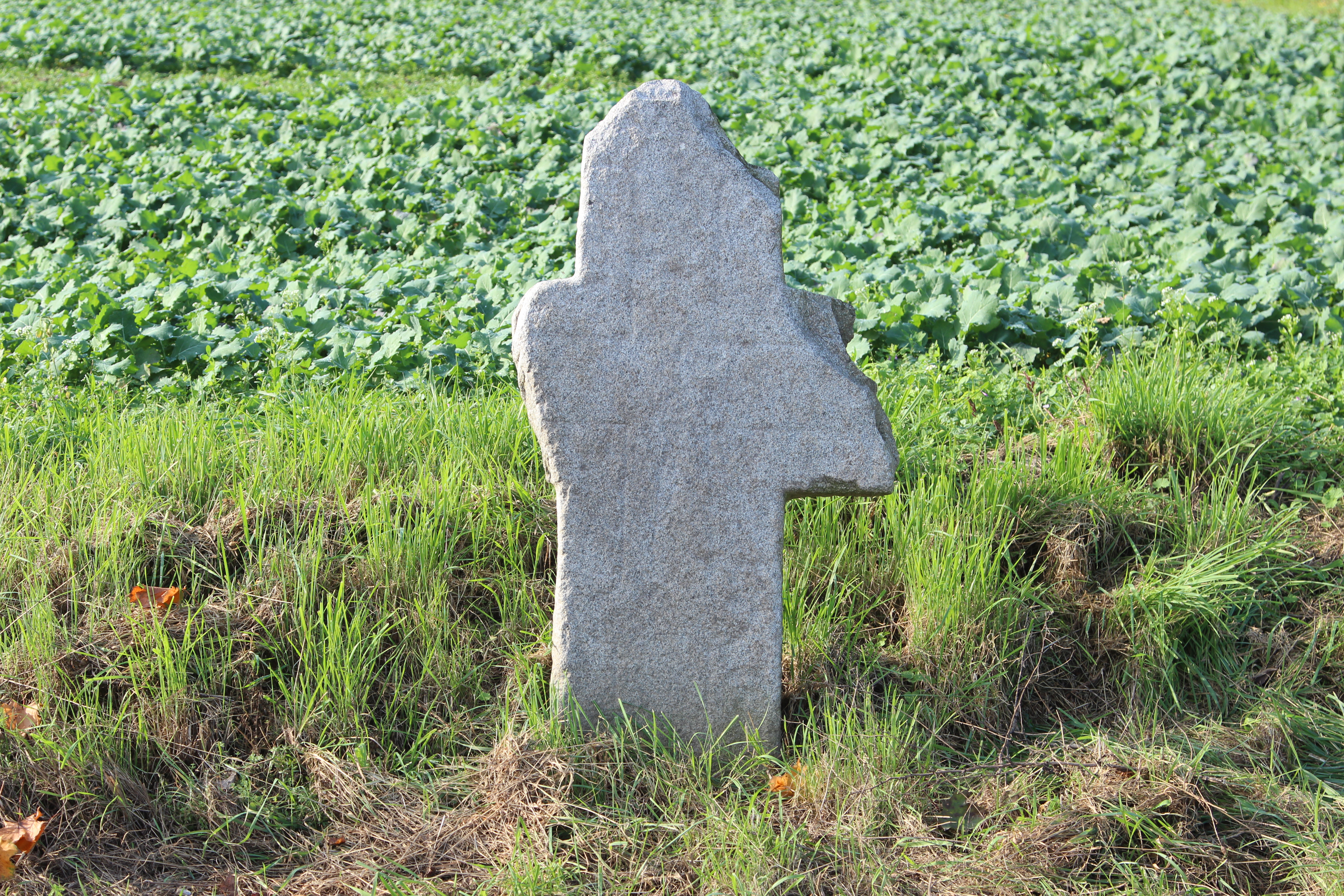
- Stone cross

- Location within Poland
- Coordinates: 50°47′48″N 17°05′41″E
- Country: Poland
- Voivodeship: Lower Silesian
- County: Strzelin
- Gmina: Strzelin

Chociwel [xɔˈt͡ɕivɛl] is a village in the administrative district of Gmina Strzelin, within Strzelin County, Lower Silesian Voivodeship, in south-western Poland.
