= Górzec =

- Village
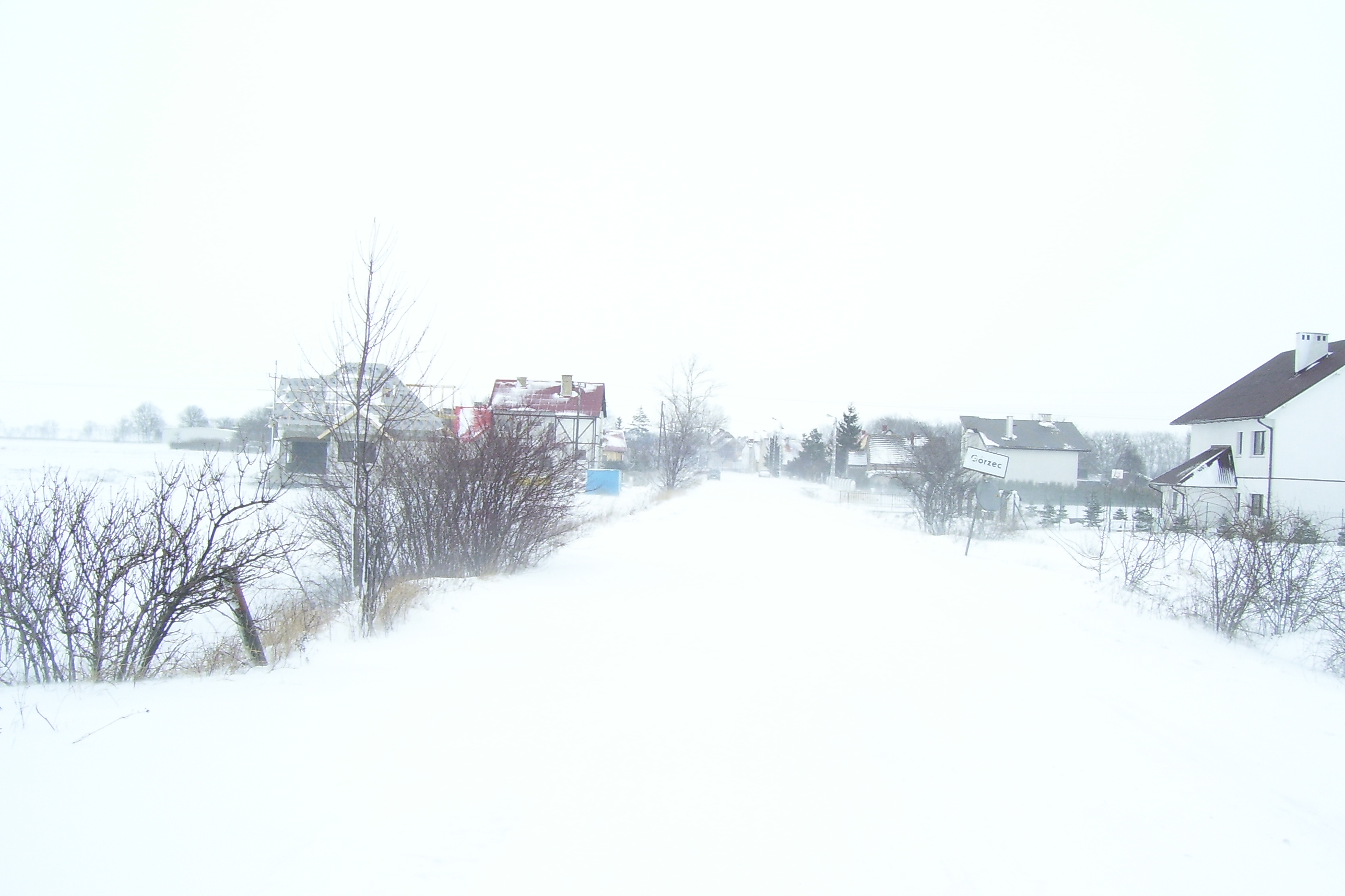
- Górzec in winter

- Location within Poland
- Coordinates: 50°48′39″N 17°04′28″E
- Country: Poland
- Voivodeship: Lower Silesian
- County: Strzelin
- Gmina: Strzelin

Górzec [ˈɡuʐɛt͡s] is a village in the administrative district of Gmina Strzelin, within Strzelin County, Lower Silesian Voivodeship, in south-western Poland.

The name of the village is of Polish origin and comes from the word góra, which means "hill".
