= Blue laser =

Laser which emits light with blue wavelengths

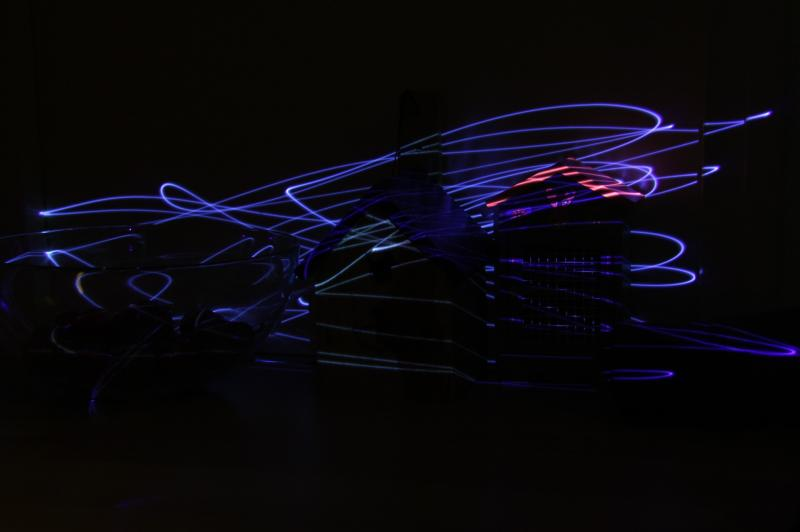
Trails of a 20 mW 405 nm violet laser shows clear fluorescence on some objects

A blue laser emits electromagnetic radiation with a wavelength between 400 and 500 nanometers, which the human eye sees in the visible spectrum as blue or violet.

Blue lasers can be produced by:

- direct, inorganic diode semiconductor lasers based on quantum wells of gallium(III) nitride at 380-417nm or indium gallium nitride at 450 nm
- diode-pumped solid-state infrared lasers with frequency-doubling to 408nm
- upconversion of direct diode semiconductor lasers via thulium- or praseodymium-doped fibers at 480 nm
- metal vapor, ionized gas lasers of helium-cadmium at 442 nm and 10–200 mW
- argon-ion lasers at 458 and 488 nm

Lasers emitting wavelengths below 445 nm appear violet, but are nonetheless also called blue lasers. Violet light's 405 nm short wavelength, on the visible spectrum, causes fluorescence in some chemicals, like radiation in the ultraviolet ("black light") spectrum (wavelengths less than 400 nm).

== History ==
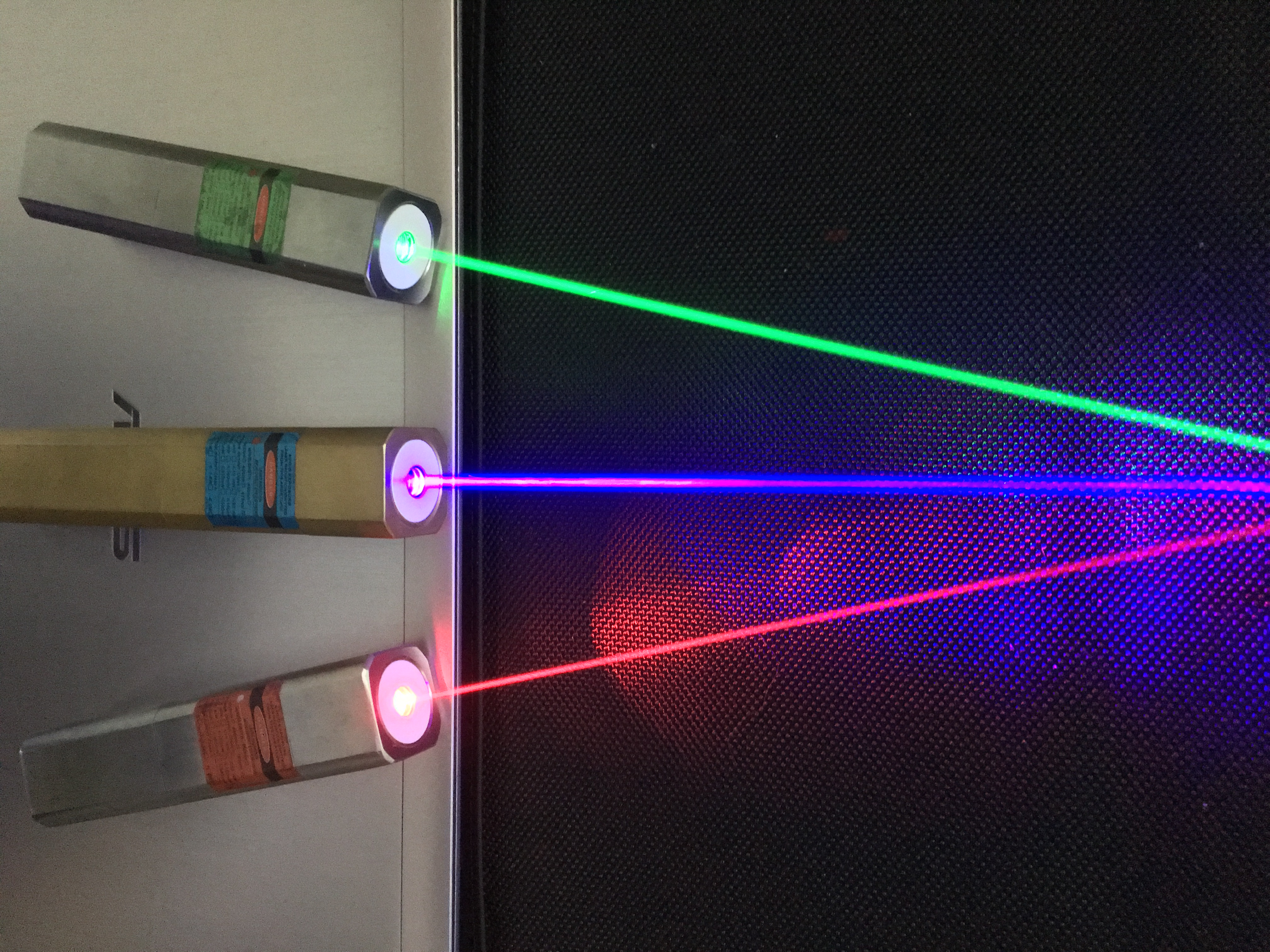
445–450 nm blue laser (middle)

Prior to the 1960s and until the late 1990s, gas and argon-ion lasers were common and suffered from poor efficiencies (0.01%) and large sizes.

In the 1960s, advancements in sapphire creation allowed researchers to deposit GaN on a sapphire base to create blue lasers, but a lattice mismatch between the structures of gallium nitride and sapphire created many defects or dislocations, leading to short lifespans (<10 hours) and low efficiency (<1%).

Additionally, gallium nitride (GaN) crystal layer construction proved difficult to manufacture as the material requires high nitrogen gas pressures and temperatures, similar to the environment for creating synthetic diamonds.

In 1992, Japanese inventor Shuji Nakamura, while working at Nichia Chemicals, invented the first blue semiconductor LED using an InGaN active region, GaN optical guide and AlGaN cladding, and four years later, the first low-power blue laser; eventually receiving the Millennium Technology Prize awarded in 2006, and a Nobel Prize for Physics along with Professor Isamu Akasaki, and Hiroshi Amano in 2014 for this invention. The gain medium defects still remained too high (10^{6}–10^{10} defects/cm^{2}) resulting in a low-power laser with a short, < 300 hour lifespan using pulsed excitation.

In the late 1990s, Dr. Sylwester Porowski, at the Institute of High Pressure Physics at the Polish Academy of Sciences in Warsaw (Poland), developed technology to create gallium nitride mono-crystals with high structural quality using magnesium doping to create fewer than 100 defects/cm^{2} — at least 10,000 times better than prior attempts. In 1999, Nakamura used Polish-produced GaN crystals, creating lasers with twice the yield and ten times the lifespan of his original designs; 3,000 hours at 30 mW.

In the 2000s, Japanese manufacturers mastered the production of a blue laser with 60 mW of power and long lifetimes, making them applicable for devices that read a dense (due to blue's short wavelength) high-speed stream of data from Blu-ray, BD-R, and BD-RE. Semiconductor lasers enabled the development of small, convenient and low-priced blue, violet, and ultraviolet (UV) lasers, which were previously not available, opening the door for many applications.

Today, blue semiconductor lasers either use a sapphire substrate (primarily used by Nichia, which uses a contract manufacturer: Sony), or a GaN mono-crystal substrate (primarily used by TopGaN), both covered with layers of gallium nitride. The GaN optical guide layer of the Nichia devices is formed from active region InGaN quantum wells or quantum dots spontaneously via self-assembly.

Polish technology is considered less expensive than the Japanese, but has a smaller share of the market. Another Polish company creates GaN crystals for use in blue diodes – Ammono, but does not produce blue lasers.

== Types ==
=== Direct Diode Semiconductor lasers ===
Blue, direct diode semiconductor lasers can be built using inorganic gallium nitride (GaN) or InGaN gain medium, upon which many (dozens or more) layers of atoms are placed to form the active part of the laser that generates photons from quantum wells. Infrared lasers built on gallium arsenide (GaAs) semiconductors use similar manufacturing techniques. To contain the photons in the gain medium, AlGaN cladding is constructed. Using methods similar to those developed for silicon semiconductors such as the inclusion of doping materials (such as magnesium), the substrate can be built free of the type of defect known as dislocations and with uniform carrier distribution, allowing the gain medium atoms to be layered such that the distances between the atoms making up ground and those of the quantum wells are uniformly the same.

Blue, direct diode lasers can also be fabricated with InGaN semiconductors (445 nm through 465 nm). The InGaN devices are perceived as significantly brighter than GaN (405) nm direct diode lasers, since the longer wavelengths are closer to the peak sensitivity of the human eye.

Use of phosphorescent direct diode blue organic light emitting diodes for lasers is impractical, due to poor lifetimes(<200hrs).

Zener diodes can be incorporated into the circuitry to minimize ESD failures.

Semiconductor lasers can be either driven by pulses or continuous wave operation.

==== Edge or Vertical Cavity Surface Emitting ====
Semiconductor lasers may be configured to emit photons either perpendicular or horizontal to the lasing medium layers depending on end use.

=== Direct Diode-pumped solid state (DPSS), frequency doubled lasers ===
Direct diode infrared semiconductor lasers, readily available since the 1960s, typically as a pump source for telecom lasers, can be frequency-doubled to the blue range by common nonlinear crystals (BBO or KTP). Greater than 1W power can be reached when the frequency doubling is resonator enhanced, resulting in Watt-class sources spanning across the visible spectrum, including a 400 nm blue laser with 2.6 W of output power.

Violet DPSS laser pointers (120 mW at 405 nm) use a direct diode infrared gallium arsenide (1 W @ 808 nm) lasers being directly doubled, without a longer-wave diode-pumped solid state laser interposed between diode laser and doubler-crystal results in higher-power.

Blue DPSS laser pointers, initial availability around 2006, have the same basic construction as DPSS green lasers. They most commonly emit light at 473 nm, which is produced by frequency doubling of 946 nm laser radiation from a diode-pumped Nd:YAG or Nd:YVO4 crystal. Neodymium-doped crystals usually produce a principal wavelength of 1064 nm, but with the proper reflective coating mirrors can be also made to lase at other non-principal neodymium wavelengths, such as the 946 nm transition used in blue-laser applications. For high output power BBO crystals are used as frequency doublers; for lower powers, KTP is used. Output powers available are up to 5000 mW. Conversion efficiency for producing 473 nm laser radiation is low with some of the best lab produced results coming in at 10–15% efficient at converting 946 nm laser radiation to 473 nm laser radiation. Due to low conversion efficiency, use of a 1000 mW IR diode results in at most 150 mW of visible blue DPSS laser light, but more practically 120mW.

=== Gas or Ion Lasers ===
Blue gas lasers are large and expensive instruments relying on population inversion in rare gas mixtures which use high currents and large cooling due to poor efficiency: 0.01%. Blue beams can be produced using helium-cadmium gas lasers at 441.6 nm, or argon-ion lasers at 458 and 488 nm,

== Blue Visual Appearance ==
The violet 405 nm laser (whether constructed directly from GaN or frequency-doubled GaAs laser diodes) is not in fact blue, but appears to the eye as violet, a color for which a human eye has a very limited sensitivity. When pointed at many white objects (such as white paper or white clothes which have been washed in certain washing powders) the visual appearance of the laser dot changes from violet to blue, due to fluorescence of brightening dyes.

For display applications which must appear "true blue", a wavelength of 445–450 nm is required. With advances in volume production, 445 nm InGaN laser diodes have dropped in price, becoming an optimal solution for laser phosphor projectors.

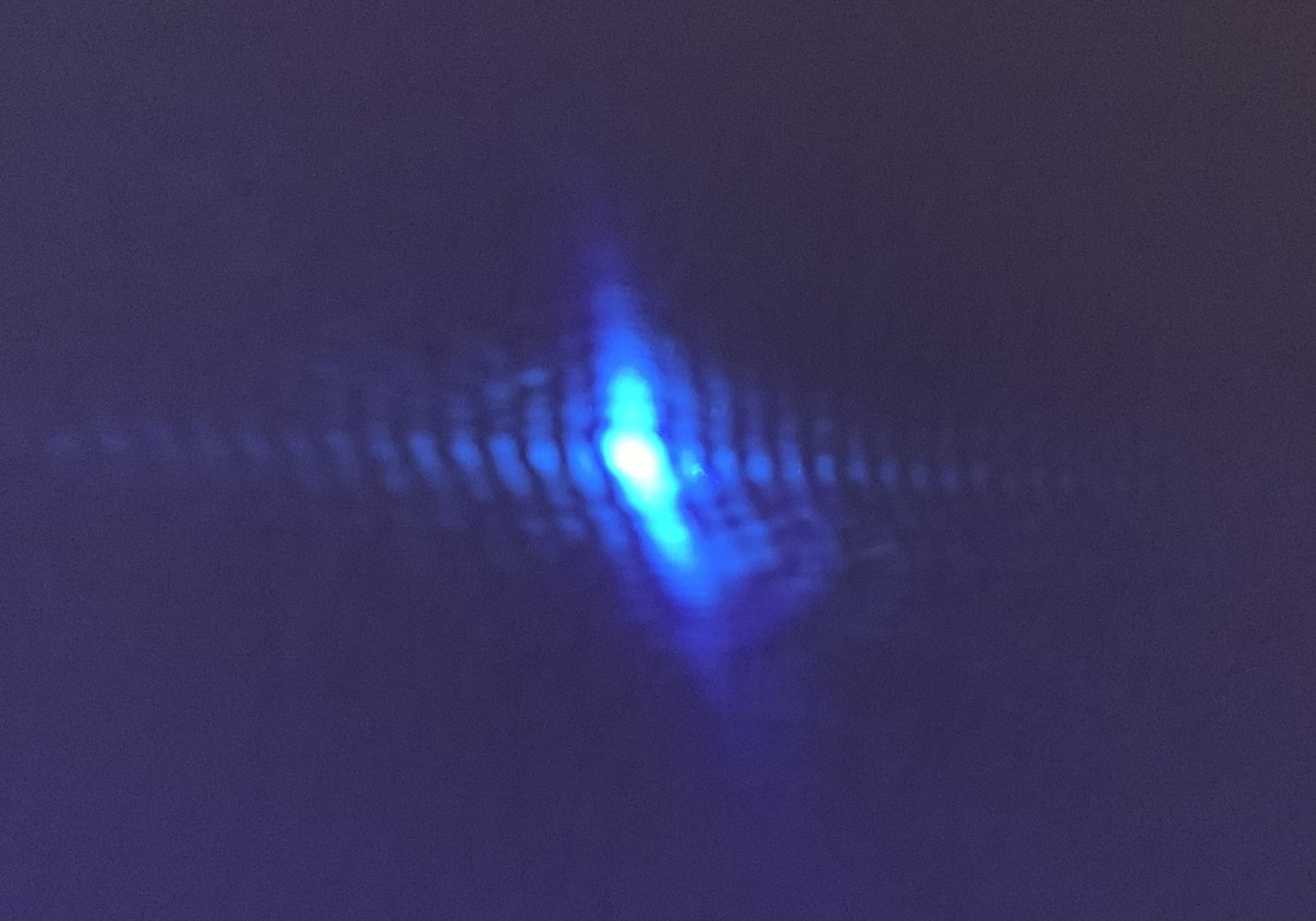
A projection onto a wall of a blue laser beam undergoing single-slit diffraction.

== Applications ==
Areas of application of the blue laser include:

- Communication with submarines
- DLP and 3LCD projectors
- Electronic equipment
- Environmental monitoring
- Handheld projectors and displays
- High-definition Blu-ray players, Blu-ray recording
- Information technology
- Laser etchers and cutters
- Laser projectors
- Medical diagnostics
  - Flow cytometry
- Medical procedures
- Laser Surgery
  - Laryngology
  - Phonosurgery
  - Otology
  - Rhinology
- Optoelectronic data storage at high density
- Telecommunications

== See also ==
- Blue LED
- List of laser articles
