= Trześnie =

- Village
- Location within Poland
- Coordinates: 50°49′N 17°7′E
- Country: Poland
- Voivodeship: Lower Silesian
- County: Strzelin
- Gmina: Strzelin

Trześnie [ˈtʂɛɕɲɛ] is a village in the administrative district of Gmina Strzelin, within Strzelin County, Lower Silesian Voivodeship, in south-western Poland.
