= Gliczyna =

- Village
- Location within Poland
- Coordinates: 50°45′21″N 17°04′03″E
- Country: Poland
- Voivodeship: Lower Silesian
- County: Strzelin
- Gmina: Strzelin

Gliczyna [ɡliˈt͡ʂɨna] is a village in the administrative district of Gmina Strzelin, within Strzelin County, Lower Silesian Voivodeship, in south-western Poland.
