= Kuropatnik =

- Village
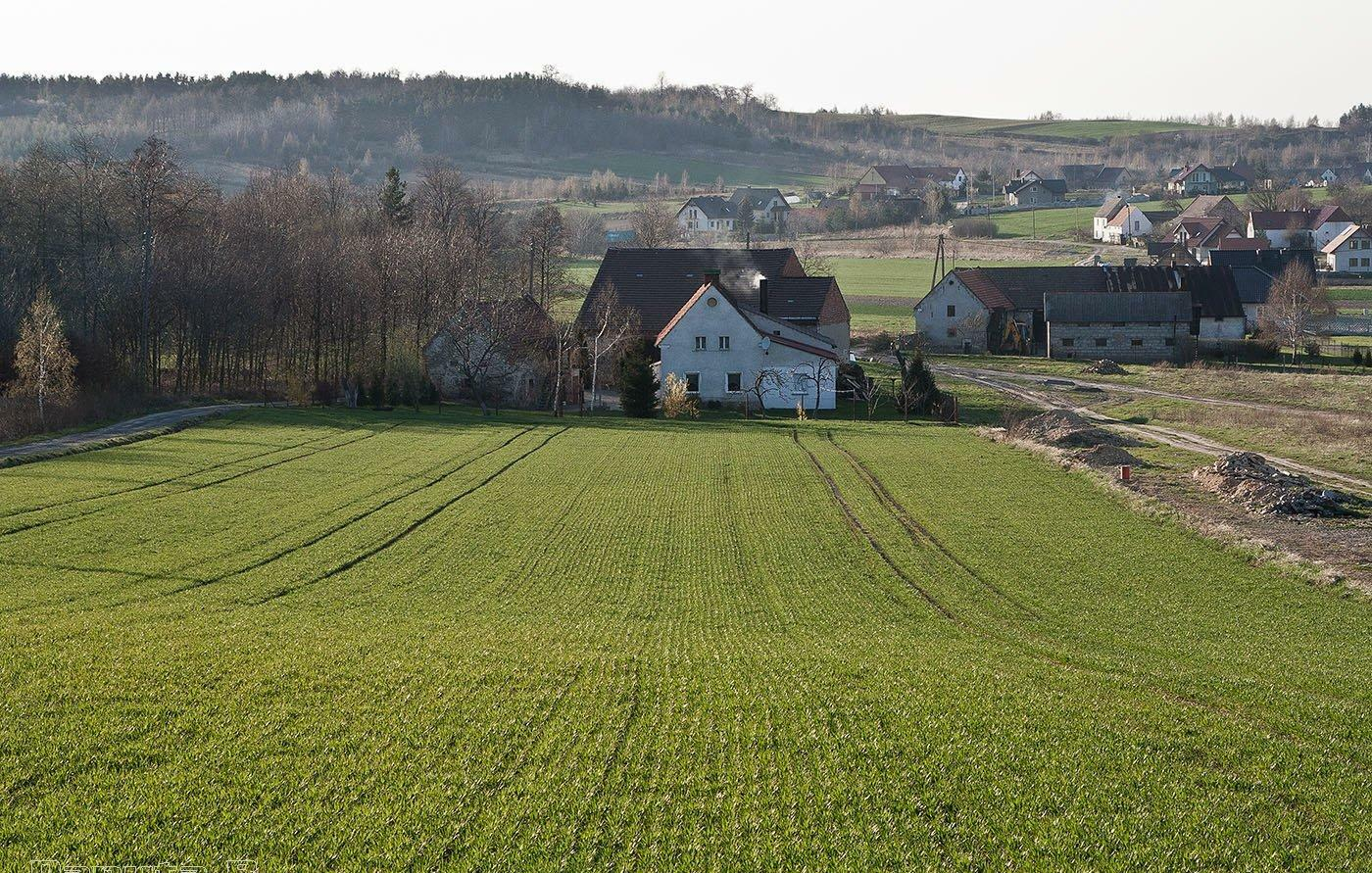

- Location within Poland
- Coordinates: 50°44′49″N 17°06′27″E
- Country: Poland
- Voivodeship: Lower Silesian
- County: Strzelin
- Gmina: Strzelin
- Population: 1,985

Kuropatnik [kurɔˈpatnik] is a village founded in the 13th century in the administrative district of Gmina Strzelin, within Strzelin County, Lower Silesian Voivodeship, in south-western Poland near the city of Wroclaw.
