= Mikoszów =

- Village
- Location within Poland
- Coordinates: 50°46′36″N 17°02′14″E
- Country: Poland
- Voivodeship: Lower Silesian
- County: Strzelin
- Gmina: Strzelin

Mikoszów [miˈkɔʂuf] is a village in the administrative district of Gmina Strzelin, within Strzelin County, Lower Silesian Voivodeship, in south-western Poland.
