= Gębice, Lower Silesian Voivodeship =

Gębice
- Village
- Location within Poland
- Coordinates: 50°42′54″N 17°02′23″E
- Country: Poland
- Voivodeship: Lower Silesian
- County: Strzelin
- Gmina: Strzelin
- Time zone: UTC+1 (CET)
  - Summer (DST): UTC+2 (CEST)
- Vehicle registration: DST

Gębice [ɡɛmˈbit͡sɛ] is a village in the administrative district of Gmina Strzelin, within Strzelin County, Lower Silesian Voivodeship, in south-western Poland.
