= Husinec =

Husinec may refer to places:

- Husinec (Prachatice District), a town in the South Bohemian Region of the Czech Republic
- Husinec (Prague-East District), a municipality and village in the Central Bohemian Region of the Czech Republic
- Husinec, Croatia, a village near Hrašćina
- Husinec, old name of Gęsiniec, a village in Lower Silesia, Poland
