= Karszówek =

- Village
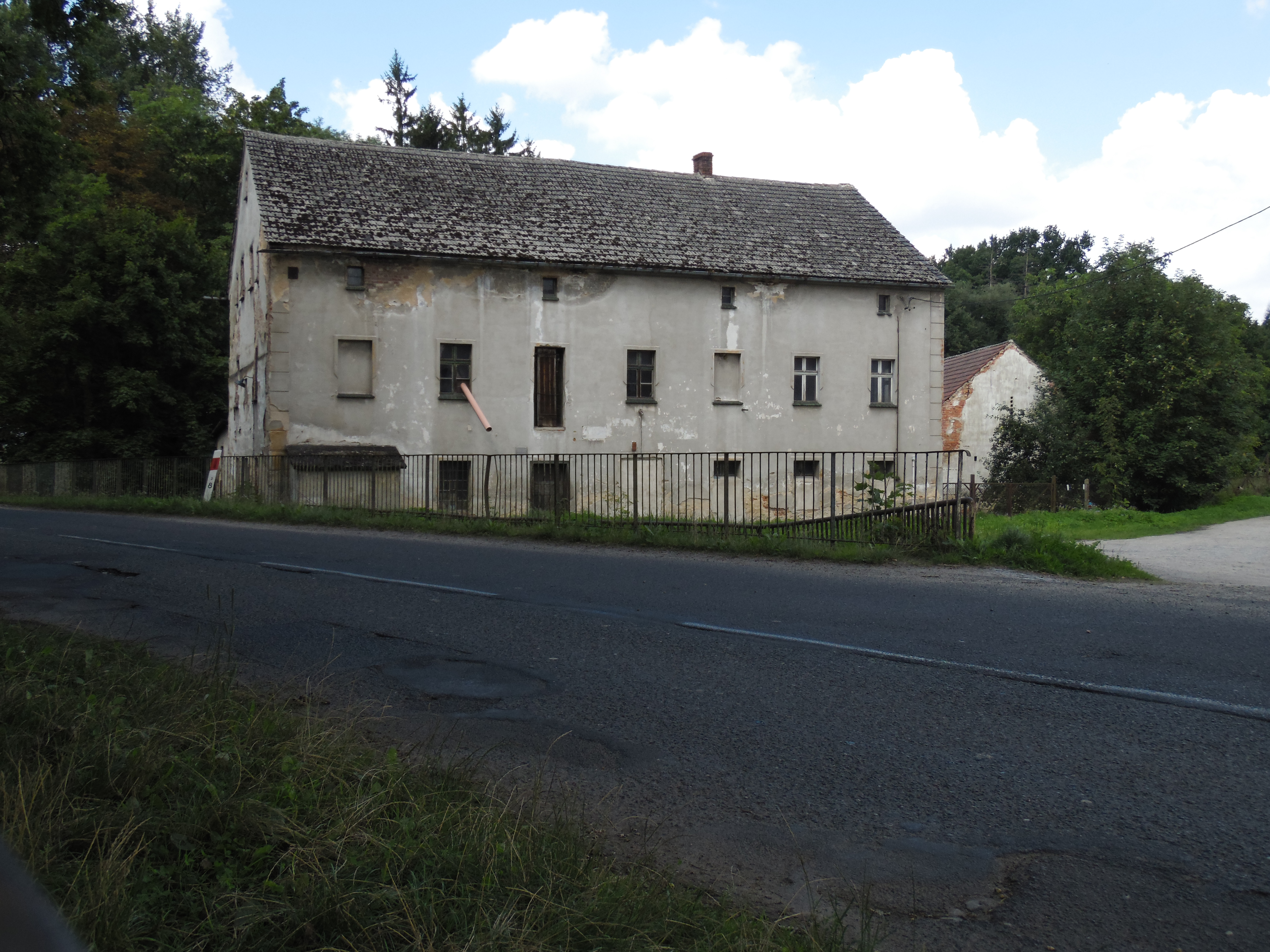
- Building in Karszówek.

- Location within Poland
- Coordinates: 50°45′21″N 17°10′38″E
- Country: Poland
- Voivodeship: Lower Silesian
- County: Strzelin
- Gmina: Strzelin

Karszówek [karˈʂuvɛk] is a village in the administrative district of Gmina Strzelin, within Strzelin County, Lower Silesian Voivodeship, in south-western Poland.
