= Dębniki =

Dębniki may refer to the following places in Poland:

- Dębniki, Kraków, a district of the city of Kraków
- Dębniki, Lower Silesian Voivodeship (south-west Poland)
- Dębniki, Łomża County in Podlaskie Voivodeship (north-east Poland)
- Dębniki, Zambrów County in Podlaskie Voivodeship (north-east Poland)

== See also ==
- Radzanowo-Dębniki in Masovian Voivodeship (east-central Poland)
