= Dobrogoszcz, Lower Silesian Voivodeship =

Dobrogoszcz
- Village
- Location within Poland
- Coordinates: 50°45′40″N 17°01′12″E
- Country: Poland
- Voivodeship: Lower Silesian
- County: Strzelin
- Gmina: Strzelin

Dobrogoszcz [dɔˈbrɔɡɔʂt͡ʂ] is a village in the administrative district of Gmina Strzelin, within Strzelin County, Lower Silesian Voivodeship, in south-western Poland.
