= Częszyce =

- Village
- Location within Poland
- Coordinates: 50°47′N 17°9′E
- Country: Poland
- Voivodeship: Lower Silesian
- County: Strzelin
- Gmina: Strzelin

Częszyce [t͡ʂɛ̃ˈʂɨt͡sɛ] is a village in the administrative district of Gmina Strzelin, within Strzelin County, Lower Silesian Voivodeship, in south-western Poland.
