= Friedrichstein =

Friedrichstein may refer to:

- Friedrichstein, former German name of Gęsiniec, a village in Poland
- Friedrichstein, Gottschee German name of Fridrihštajn, a mountain peak and former castle of the Blagaj family in Kočevje, Slovenia
- Friedrichstein Palace, a former palace near Königsberg in East Prussia, main seat of the Dönhoff family
