= Skoroszowice =

- Village
- Location within Poland
- Coordinates: 50°42′N 17°1′E
- Country: Poland
- Voivodeship: Lower Silesian
- County: Strzelin
- Gmina: Strzelin

Skoroszowice [skɔrɔʂɔˈvit͡sɛ] (German: Korschwitz) is a village in the administrative district of Gmina Strzelin, within Strzelin County, Lower Silesian Voivodeship, in south-western Poland.
