= Wąwolnica =

Wąwolnica may refer to the following places in Poland:

- Wąwolnica, Lower Silesian Voivodeship (south-west Poland)
- Wąwolnica, Lublin Voivodeship (east Poland)
