= Eisenberg (surname) =

Eisenberg (German: habitational name from any of several places so named from Middle High German īsen "iron" + berg "mountain, hill") is a German surname. Notable people with the surname include:

- Arlene Eisenberg (1934–2001), American author
- Arlo Eisenberg (born 1973), American aggressive inline skater
- Aron Eisenberg (1969–2019), American actor
- Billy Eisenberg (1937–2025), American bridge and backgammon player
- David Eisenberg (born 1939), American biochemist
- Emma Copley Eisenberg, American writer
- Filip Eisenberg (1876–1942), Polish physician and bacteriologist
- Hallie Eisenberg (born 1992), American actress
- Howard Eisenberg (born 1926), American author
- Jacob Eisenberg (1897–1965), Israeli artist
- Jacob Eisenberg (musician) (1898–1964), American pianist, author and teacher
- Jerome M. Eisenberg (1930–2022), American dealer
- Jerry Eisenberg (1937–2025), American television producer, animator, storyboard artist, and character designer
- Jesse Eisenberg (born 1983), American actor
- Jewlia Eisenberg, American musician, vocalist, and composer
- John Eisenberg, American lawyer and U.S. National Security Council Legal Advisor
- José Eisenberg (born 1945), Italian entrepreneur and founder of Eisenberg Paris
- Josy Eisenberg (1933–2017), French animator of television and co-scenarist of the movie Rabbi Jacob
- Larry Eisenberg (1919–2018), American writer
- Leon Eisenberg (1922–2009), American child psychiatrist, social psychiatrist and medical educator
- Louis Eisenberg (1876–?), Ukrainian-American chess master
- Ludwig Eisenberg, birth name of Lale Sokolov (1916–2006), the tattooist of Auschwitz
- Matthias Eisenberg (born 1956), German organist
- Michael Eisenberg, Israeli venture capitalist
- Moshe Eisenberg, birth name of Moshe Peled (1925–2000), Israeli Brigadier General
- Ned Eisenberg (1957–2022), American actor
- Ophira Eisenberg (born 1972), Canadian comic, writer, and actress
- Pablo Eisenberg (1932–2022), American scholar, social justice advocate, and tennis player
- Rebecca Eisenberg (born 1968), American entrepreneur
- Rebecca S. Eisenberg, American lawyer
- Ruth Brewer Eisenberg (1902–1996), American pianist, "Ivory" of inter-racial piano duo, Ebony and Ivory
- Shaul Eisenberg (1921–1997), Jewish businessman
- Sonja Eisenberg (1926–2017), German-American artist
- Steven Eisenberg (born 1970), American oncologist and author
- Susan Eisenberg (born 1964), American voice actress
- Ted Eisenberg (born 1952), American breast surgeon and knife thrower
- Zef Eisenberg (born 1973), British entrepreneur, ultra-speed motorbike racer, and television presenter

== See also ==
- Aizenberg
- Eizenberg
