= Unipress =

Unipress, UniPress or UNIPRESS may refer to

- A division of the scholarly publishing house, Vandenhoeck & Ruprecht
- United Press International, an international news agency
- The Institute of High Pressure Physics of the Polish Academy of Sciences

== See also ==
- Unipres
