= Myszkowice =

Myszkowice may refer to the following places:

- Myszkowice, Lower Silesian Voivodeship in southwest Poland)
- Myszkowice, Masovian Voivodeship in east-central Poland)
- Myszkowice, Silesian Voivodeship in south Poland)
- Myshkovychi, Ternopil Oblast in Ukraine, formerly Myszkowice

== See also ==
- Myczkowce, a village in the administrative district of Gmina Solina, Lesko County, Subcarpathian Voivodeship, south-eastern Poland
