= Porowski =

- Pronunciation: Polish: [pɔ.rɔf.skʲi]

Other gender
- Feminine: Porowska

Origin
- Origin: Poland

Porowski (feminine Porowska) is a Polish surname. Notable people include:

- Antoni Porowski (born 1984), Canadian actor
- Violetta Porowska (born 1968), Polish politician
- Sylwester Porowski (born 1938), Polish physicist
