= Dankowice, Strzelin County =

Dankowice
- Village
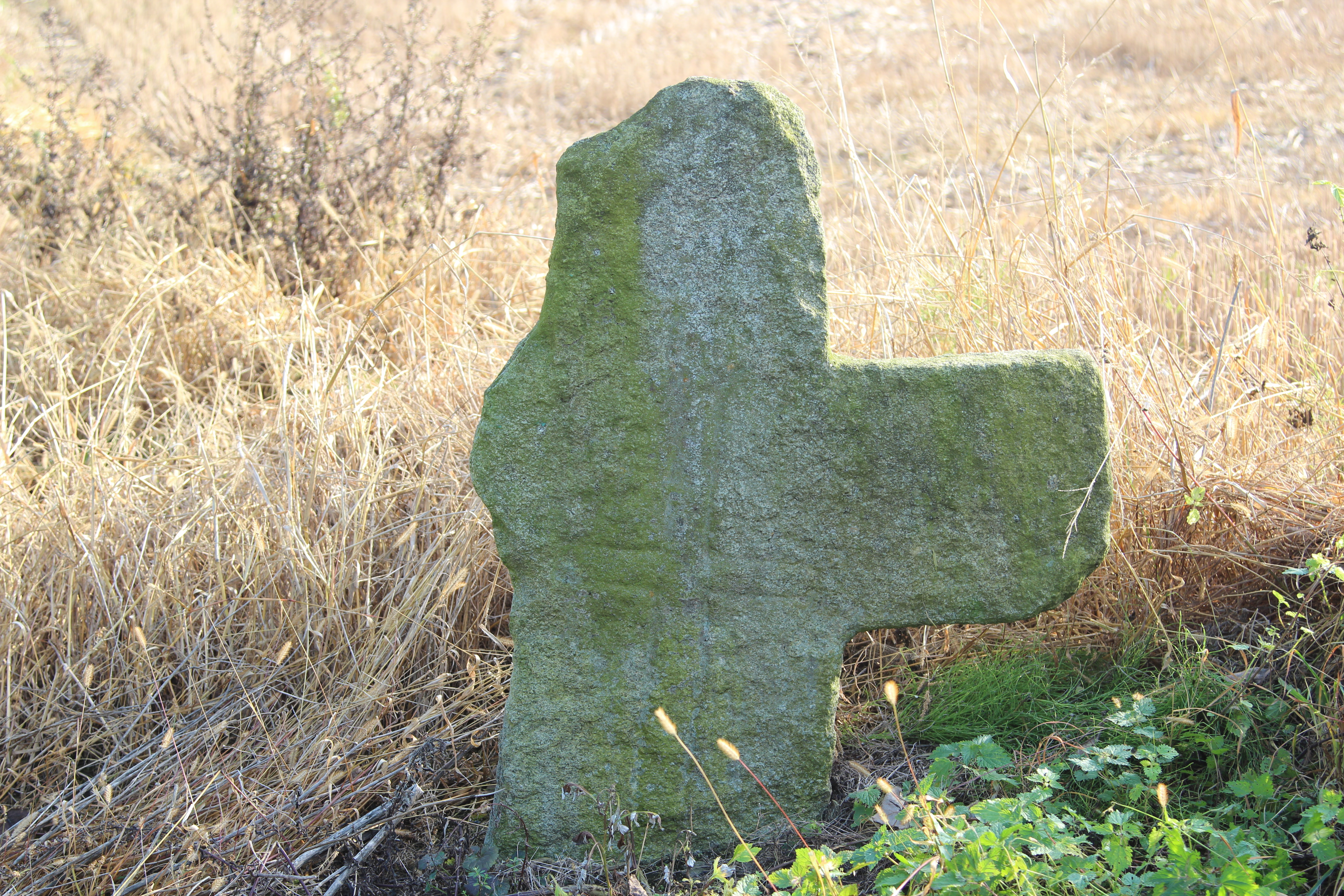
- Stone cross

- Location within Poland
- Coordinates: 50°43′16″N 17°00′51″E
- Country: Poland
- Voivodeship: Lower Silesian
- County: Strzelin
- Gmina: Strzelin

Dankowice [dankɔˈvit͡sɛ] is a village in the administrative district of Gmina Strzelin, within Strzelin County, Lower Silesian Voivodeship, in south-western Poland.
