= Nowolesie =

- Village
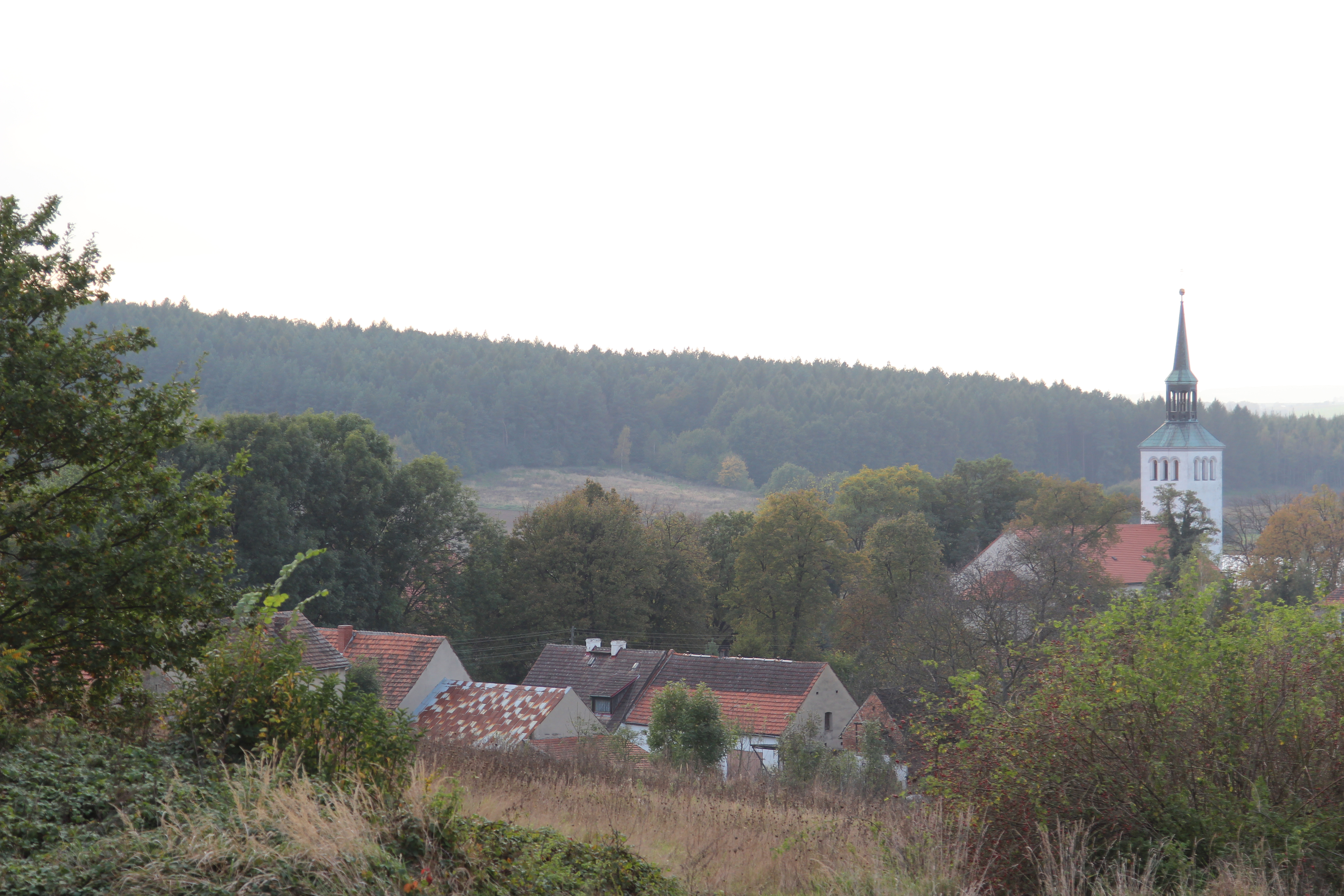

- Location within Poland
- Coordinates: 50°42′N 17°4′E
- Country: Poland
- Voivodeship: Lower Silesian
- County: Strzelin
- Gmina: Strzelin

Nowolesie [nɔvɔˈlɛɕɛ] is a village in the administrative district of Gmina Strzelin, within Strzelin County, Lower Silesian Voivodeship, in south-western Poland.
