= Kaczów =

- Village
- Location within Poland
- Coordinates: 50°44′09″N 17°06′25″E
- Country: Poland
- Voivodeship: Lower Silesian
- County: Strzelin
- Gmina: Strzelin

Kaczów [ˈkat͡ʂuf] is a village in the administrative district of Gmina Strzelin, within Strzelin County, Lower Silesian Voivodeship, in south-western Poland.
