= Gościęcice =

- Village
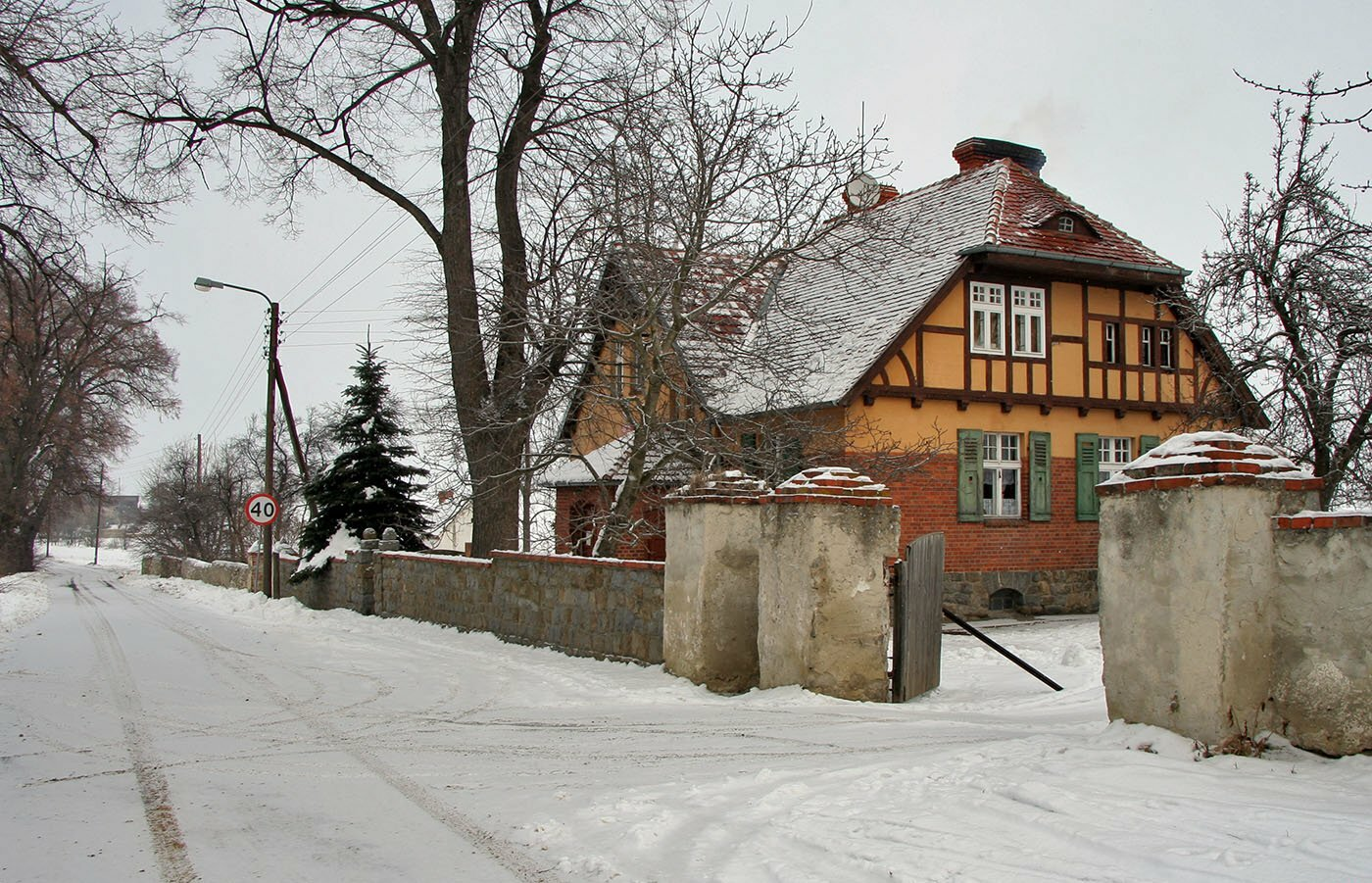
- Gościęcice in winter

- Location within Poland
- Coordinates: 50°45′29″N 17°05′03″E
- Country: Poland
- Voivodeship: Lower Silesian
- County: Strzelin
- Gmina: Strzelin
- Time zone: UTC+1 (CET)
  - Summer (DST): UTC+2 (CEST)
- Vehicle registration: DST

Gościęcice (Polish: [ɡɔɕt͡ɕɛɲˈt͡ɕit͡sɛ]) is a village in the administrative district of Gmina Strzelin, within Strzelin County, Lower Silesian Voivodeship, in southwestern Poland.

Gościęcice has one of the largest sweet chestnut crops in Poland. Their cultivation dates back to the Middle Ages, when local Catholic monks used these chestnuts for medical purposes.

In the Middle Ages, the village was part of Poland, and afterwards it was also part of Bohemia, Prussia, and Germany, before it was awarded to Poland following World War II in 1945.
