= Głęboka, Strzelin County =

Głęboka
- Village
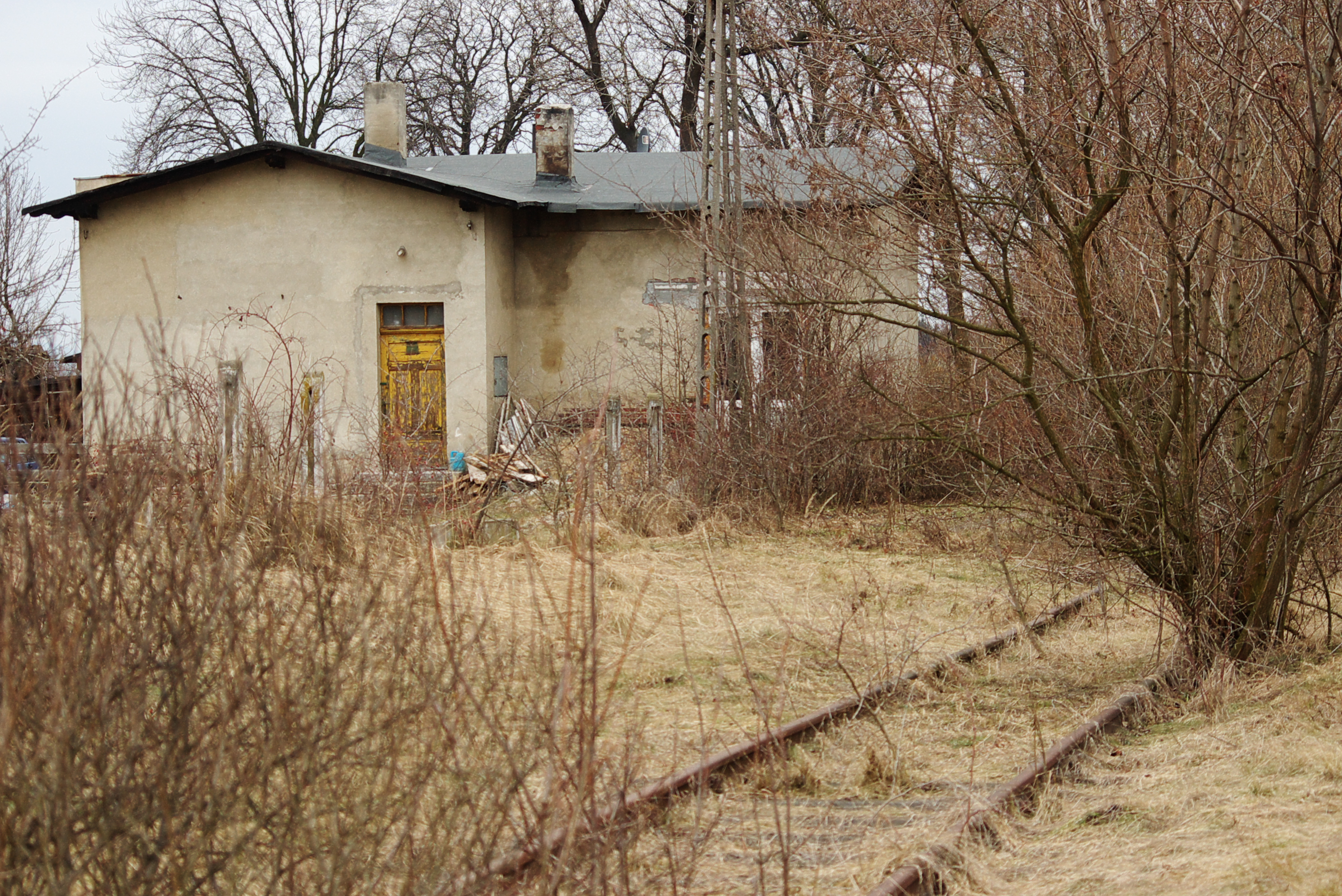
- Railway station

- Location within Poland
- Coordinates: 50°46′N 17°8′E
- Country: Poland
- Voivodeship: Lower Silesian
- County: Strzelin
- Gmina: Strzelin

Głęboka [ɡwɛmˈbɔka] is a village in the administrative district of Gmina Strzelin, within Strzelin County, Lower Silesian Voivodeship, in south-western Poland.
