= Biedrzychów, Lower Silesian Voivodeship =

Biedrzychów
- Village
- Location within Poland
- Coordinates: 50°46′25″N 17°07′05″E
- Country: Poland
- Voivodeship: Lower Silesian
- County: Strzelin
- Gmina: Strzelin

Biedrzychów [bjɛˈdʐɨxuf] is a village in the administrative district of Gmina Strzelin, within Strzelin County, Lower Silesian Voivodeship, in south-western Poland.
