= Pęcz =

- Village
- Location within Poland
- Coordinates: 50°47′N 17°3′E
- Country: Poland
- Voivodeship: Lower Silesian
- County: Strzelin
- Gmina: Strzelin

Pęcz [pɛnt͡ʂ] is a village in the administrative district of Gmina Strzelin, within Strzelin County, Lower Silesian Voivodeship, in south-western Poland.
