= Biały Kościół, Lower Silesian Voivodeship =

Biały Kościół
- Village
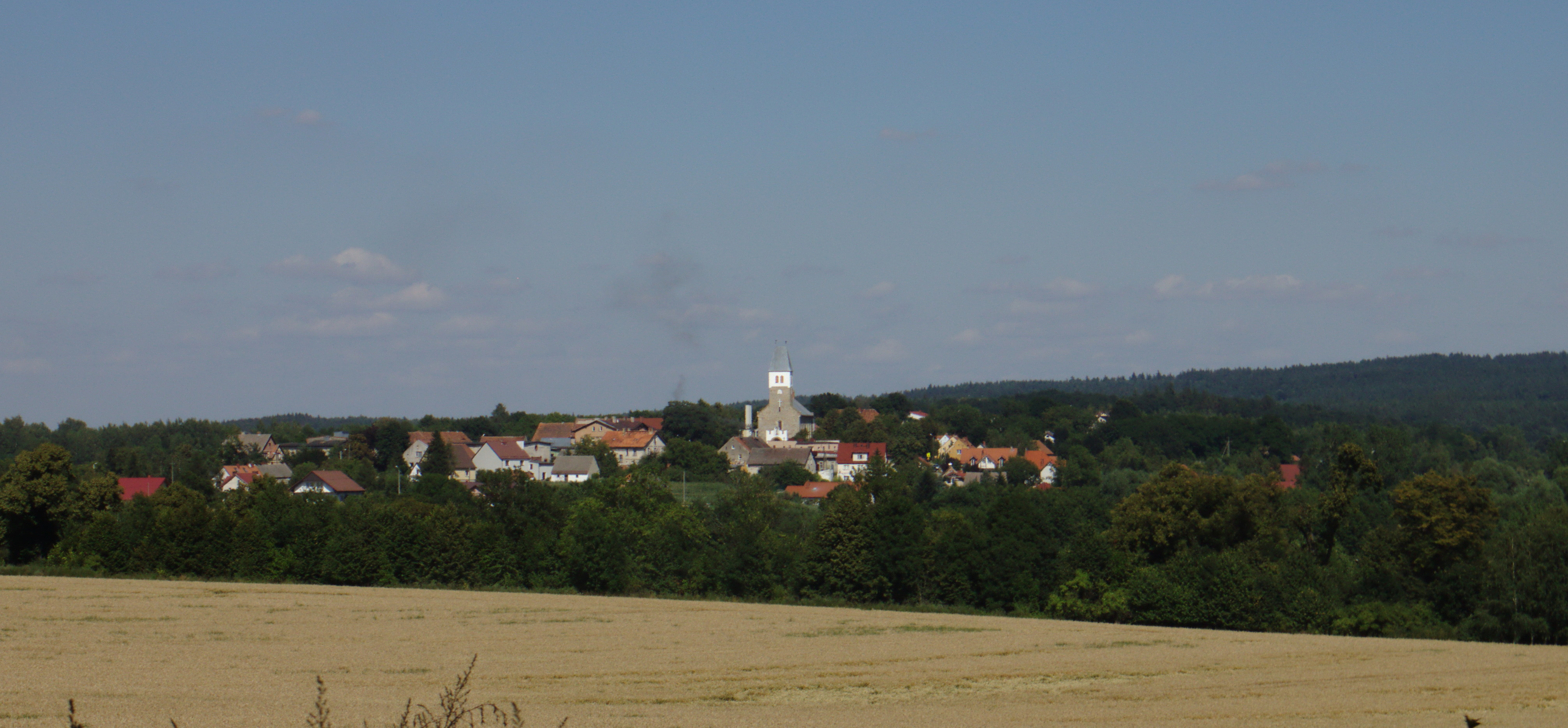

- Location within Poland
- Coordinates: 50°43′50″N 17°02′12″E
- Country: Poland
- Voivodeship: Lower Silesian
- County: Strzelin
- Gmina: Strzelin
- Highest elevation: 203 m (666 ft)
- Lowest elevation: 180 m (590 ft)
- Population: 300
- Website: http://www.bialykosciol.pl

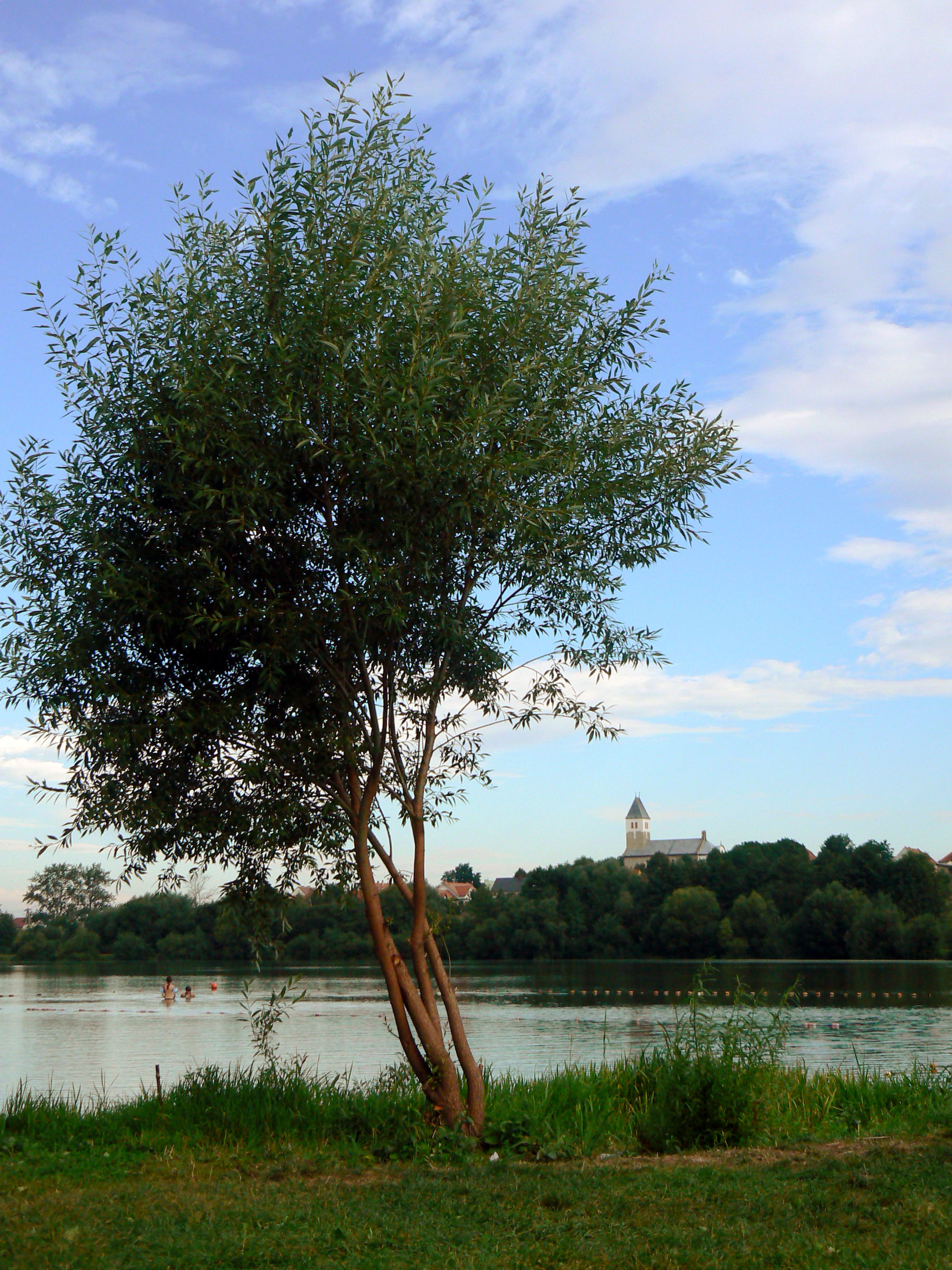
Tree by the lake near Biały Kościół

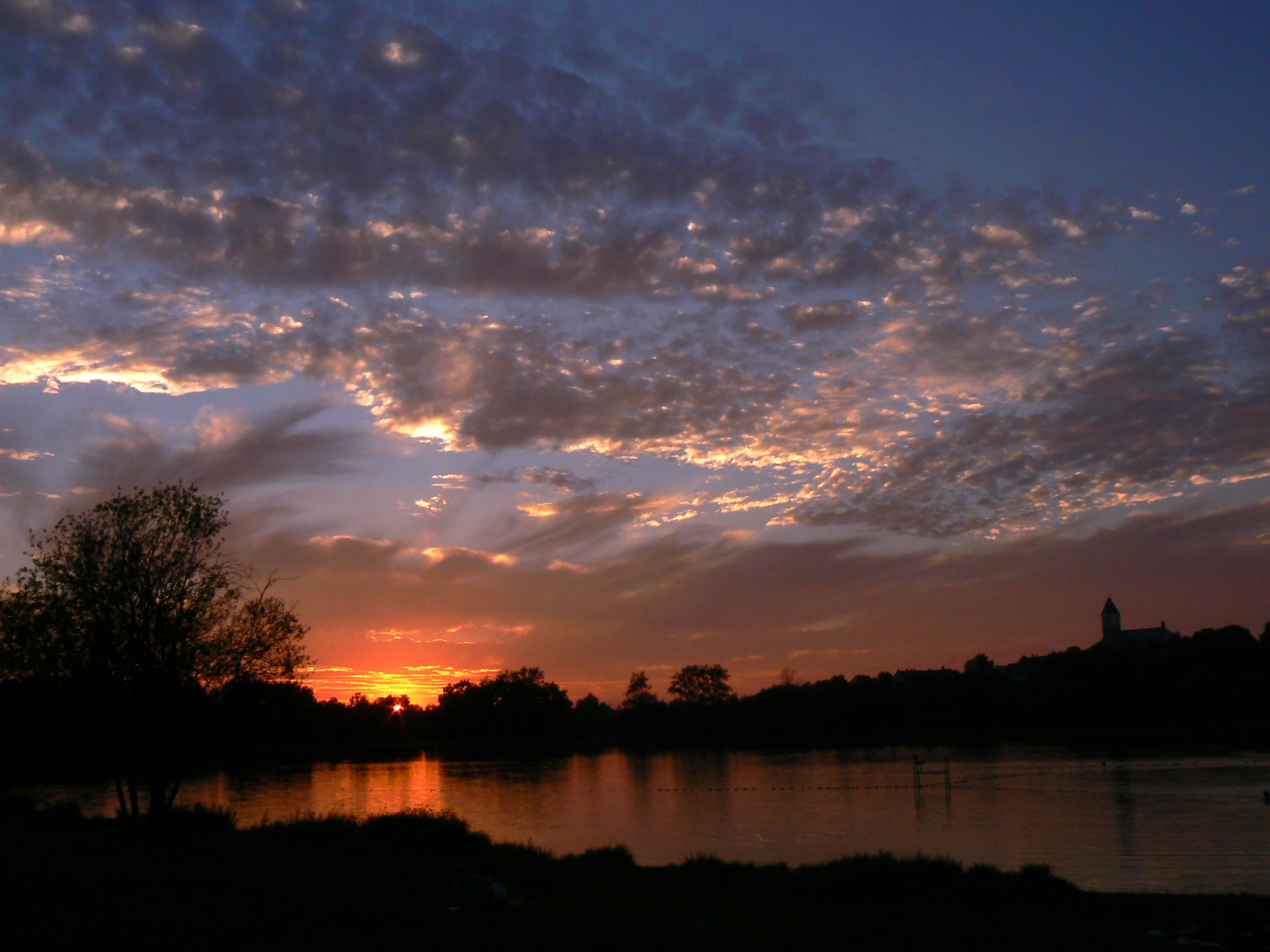
Sunset over Biały Kościół

Biały Kościół [ˈbjawɨ ˈkɔɕt͡ɕuu̯] is a village in the administrative district of Gmina Strzelin, within Strzelin County, Lower Silesian Voivodeship, in south-western Poland.
