= Warkocz =

Warkocz may refer to the following places in Poland:

- Warkocz in Gmina Strzelin, Strzelin County in Lower Silesian Voivodeship (SW Poland)
- Other places called Warkocz (listed in Polish Wikipedia)
