= Pławna, Lower Silesian Voivodeship =

Pławna
- Village
- Location within Poland
- Coordinates: 50°50′N 17°6′E
- Country: Poland
- Voivodeship: Lower Silesian
- County: Strzelin
- Gmina: Strzelin
- Population: 350

Pławna [ˈpwavna] is a village in the administrative district of Gmina Strzelin, within Strzelin County, Lower Silesian Voivodeship, in south-western Poland.
