= Nieszkowice =

Nieszkowice may refer to the following places in Poland:

- Nieszkowice, Strzelin County in Gmina Strzelin, Strzelin County in Lower Silesian Voivodeship (SW Poland)
- Nieszkowice, Wołów County in Gmina Wołów, Wołów County in Lower Silesian Voivodeship (SW Poland)
