= Brożec =

Brożec may refer to the following places in Poland:

- Brożec, Lower Silesian Voivodeship (south-west Poland)
- Brożec, Opole Voivodeship (south-west Poland)
