= Gębczyce =

- Village
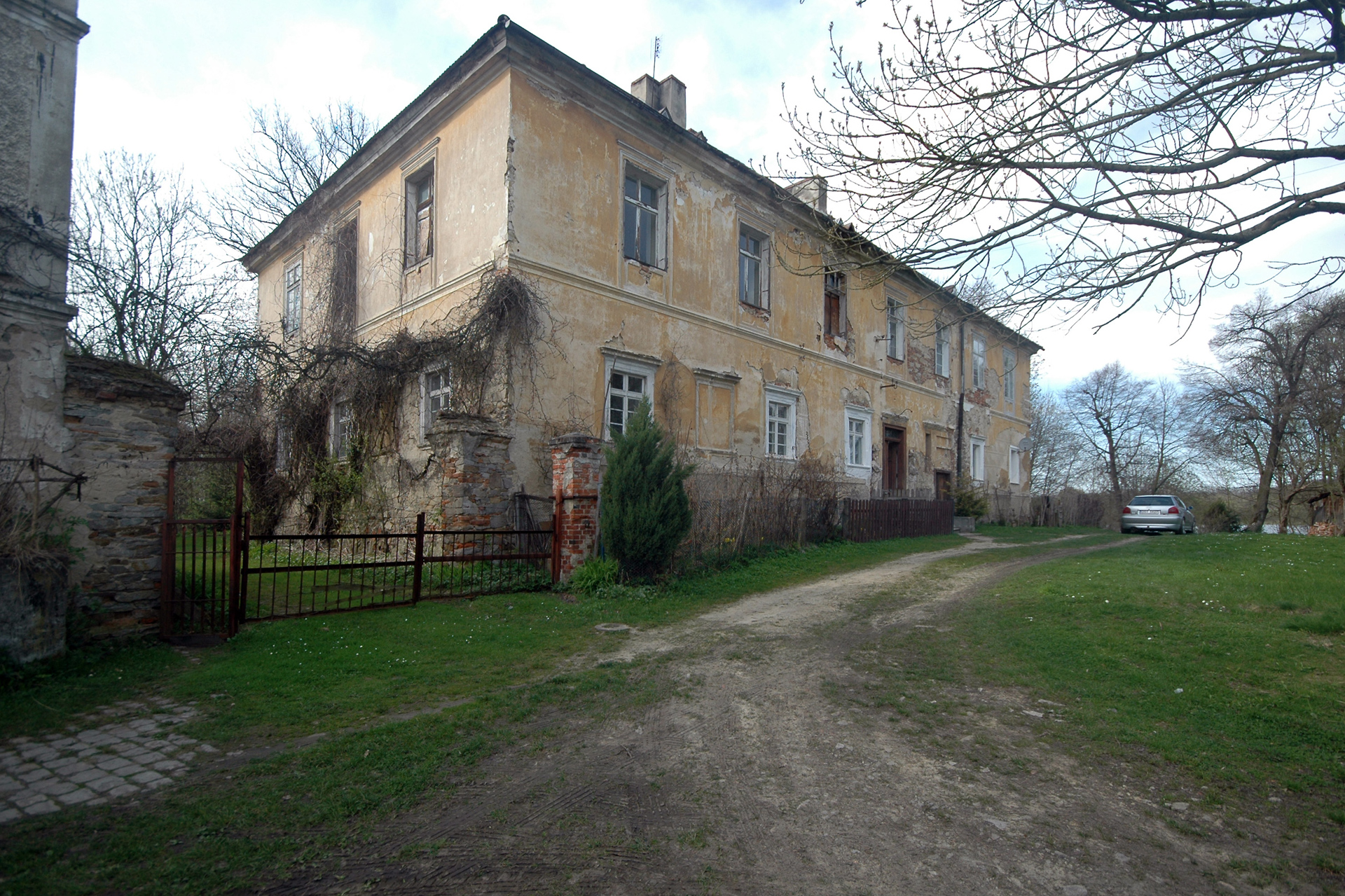
- Manor

- Location within Poland
- Coordinates: 50°43′24″N 17°03′16″E
- Country: Poland
- Voivodeship: Lower Silesian
- County: Strzelin
- Gmina: Strzelin

Gębczyce [ɡɛmpˈt͡ʂɨt͡sɛ] is a village in the administrative district of Gmina Strzelin, within Strzelin County, Lower Silesian Voivodeship, in south-western Poland.
