= Strzegów =

Strzegów may refer to the following places in Poland:

- Strzegów, Lower Silesian Voivodeship (south-west Poland)
- Strzegów, Lubusz Voivodeship (west Poland)
- Strzegów, Opole Voivodeship (south-west Poland)
