= Kazanów =

Kazanów may refer to the following places in Poland:

- Kazanów, Lower Silesian Voivodeship (south-west Poland)
- Kazanów, Masovian Voivodeship (east-central Poland)
