= Ulica =

Ulica may refer to several places in Poland:

- Ulsza, formerly Ulica, a village in Gmina Strzelin, Strzelin County, Lower Silesian Voivodeship
- Ulica, part of the village of Jadowniki Mokre, Gmina Wietrzychowice, Tarnów County, Lesser Poland Voivodeship
