= Ludwig Eisenberg =

Ludwig Eisenberg may refer to:

- Lale Sokolov (né Ludwig Eisenberg, 1916–2006), Austro-Hungarian-born Slovak-Australian businessman and Holocaust survivor
- Ludwig Eisenberg (writer) (1858–1910), Austrian writer and encyclopedist
