= Eisenberger =

The surname Eisenberger may refer to:

- Georg Eisenberger (1863 - 1945), a German politician
- Severin Eisenberger (1879 - 1945), a Jewish Polish-born concert pianist and teacher
- Jenö Eisenberger (1922 - 2016), a Hungarian-Austrian employer
- Fred Eisenberger (born 1952), a Canadian politician
- Gábor Péter, born Eisenberger Benjámin (or Auspitz Benő) (1906 - 1993)
- Sylvia Eisenberger, Austrian actress

== See also ==
- Eisenberg (disambiguation)
