= Eizenberg =

Eizenberg is a variant of the German and Ashkenazi Jewish surname Eisenberg in some other languages. Notable people with the surname include:

- Eyal Eizenberg (born 1963), Israeli general
- Julie Eizenberg, founder of Koning Eizenberg Architecture, American architecture firm

== See also ==
- Aizenberg
