= Wąwolnica, Lower Silesian Voivodeship =

Wąwolnica
- Village
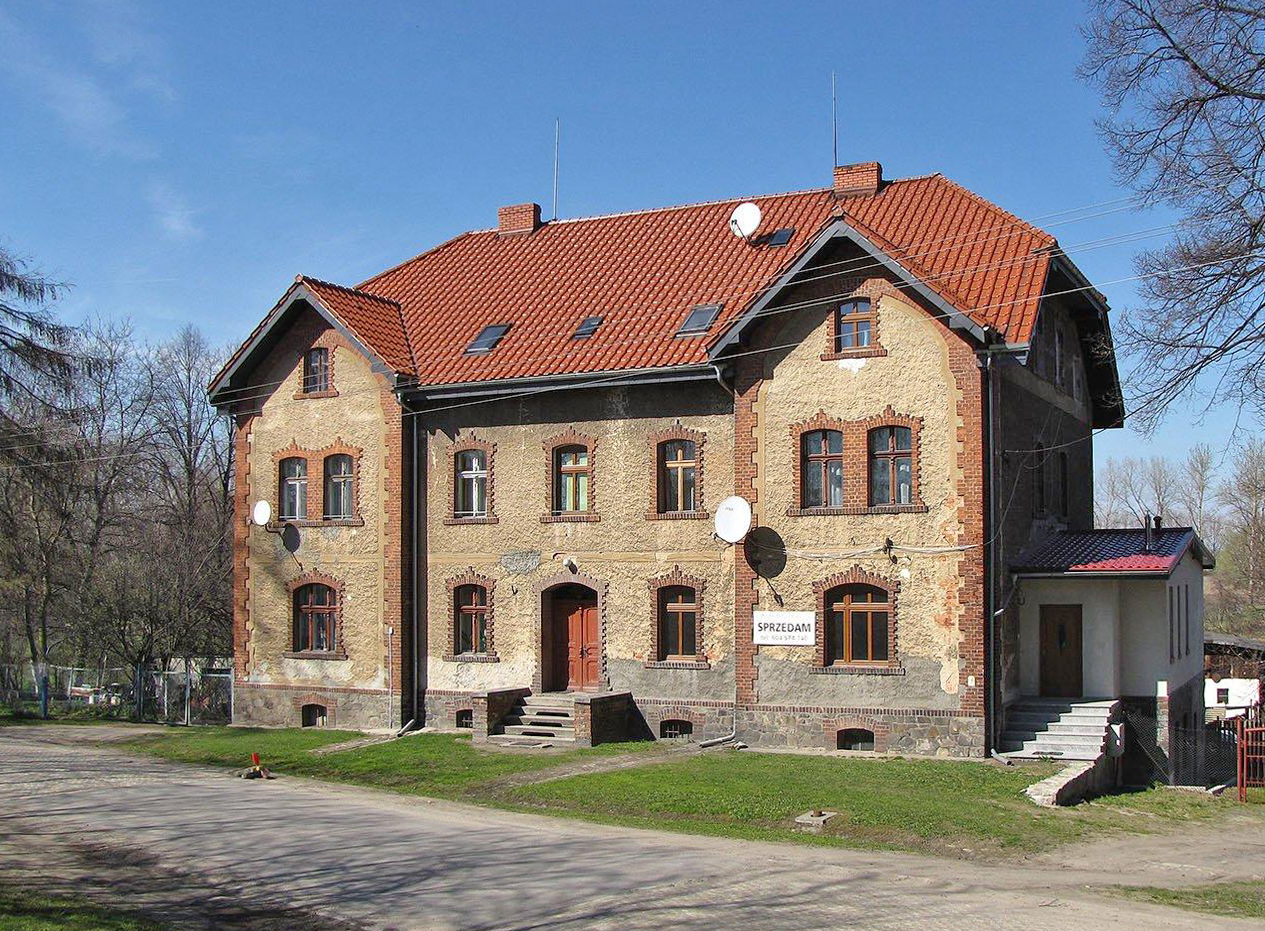

- Location within Poland
- Coordinates: 50°43′44″N 17°00′58″E
- Country: Poland
- Voivodeship: Lower Silesian
- County: Strzelin
- Gmina: Strzelin

Wąwolnica [vɔ̃vɔlˈnit͡sa] is a village in the administrative district of Gmina Strzelin, within Strzelin County, Lower Silesian Voivodeship, in south-western Poland.
