= Vashegy =

Vashegy is a Hungarian name of the following places, which were all formerly within the Hungarian part of the Austro-Hungarian Empire:

- Dealu Ferului, a village in the commune of Vințu de Jos in Alba County, Romania
- Železník (village), in the Svidník District of the Prešov Region of Slovakia
- Železna Gora, a village in the municipality of Štrigova in Međimurje County, Croatia
- Vas-hegy, a mountain in the Alpokalja mountain range on the border between Vas County, Hungary, and Burgenland, Austria

== See also ==
- Eisenberg (disambiguation), a German equivalent place name
- György Vashegyi (born 1970), Hungarian harpsichordist and conductor
