= Nieszkowice, Strzelin County =

Nieszkowice
- Village
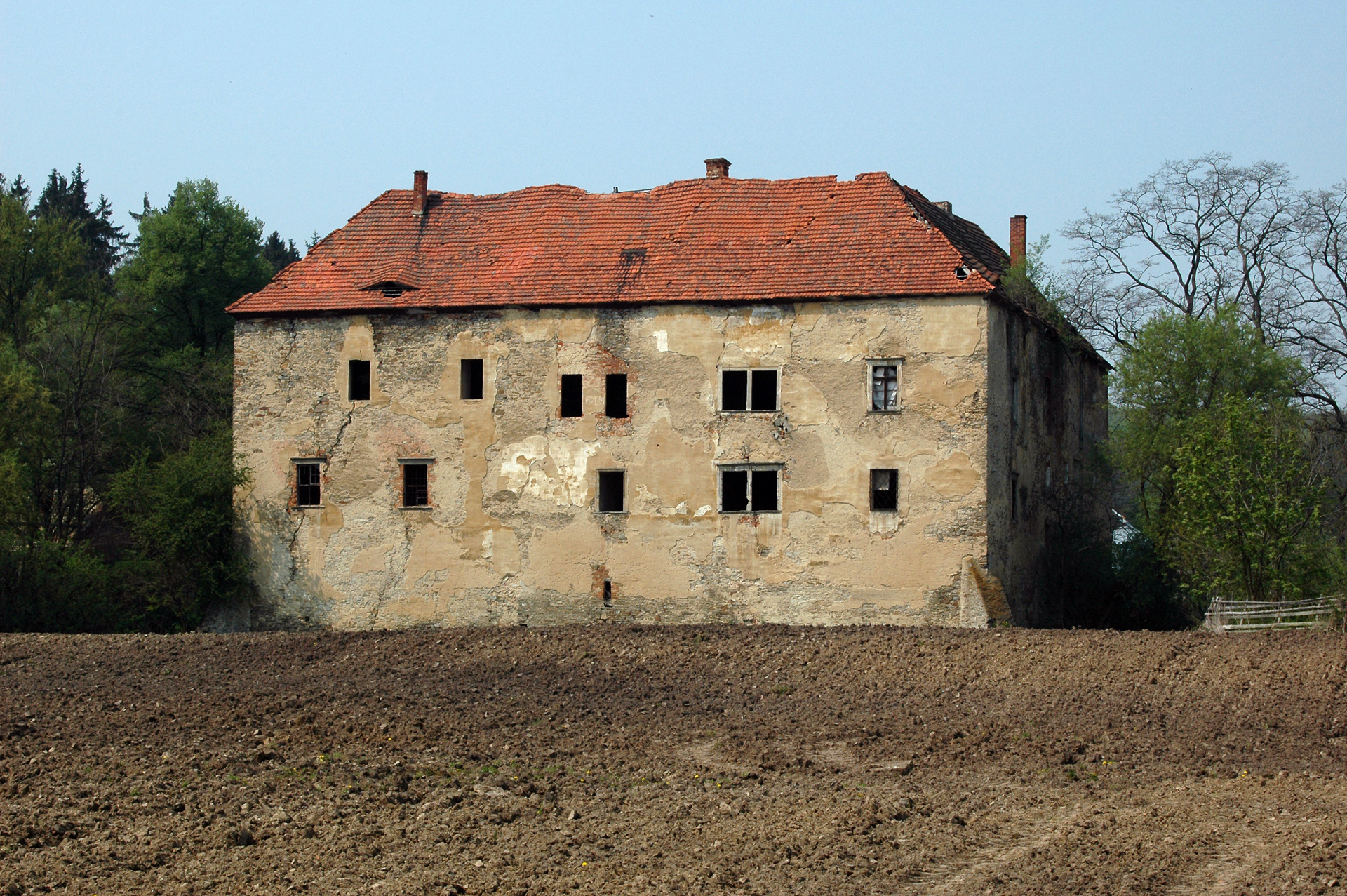
- Derelict castle in Nieszkowice

- Location within Poland
- Coordinates: 50°42′16″N 16°58′50″E
- Country: Poland
- Voivodeship: Lower Silesian
- County: Strzelin
- Gmina: Strzelin

Nieszkowice [ɲɛʂkɔˈvit͡sɛ] is a village in the administrative district of Gmina Strzelin, within Strzelin County, Lower Silesian Voivodeship, in south-western Poland.
