= Aizenberg =

The German and Ashkenazi Jewish surname Eisenberg may be rendered in different ways via other languages.

- Aizenberg is a phonetic transliteration commonly via Russian Айзенберг.
- Ajsenberg is a Polish-language rendering.
- Other variants include Aisenberg, Aisemberg, etc.

Notable people with these surnames include:

- Joanna Aizenberg (born 1960), Russian-born chemist and biomimetics expert
- Geraldine Aizenberg (born 1978), Argentine tennis player
- Roberto Aizenberg (1928–1996), Argentine painter and sculptor
- Adriana Aizemberg (born 1938), Argentine film and television actress
- Isaac Aisemberg (1918–1997), Argentine writer, screenwriter and dramatist
- Fay Ajzenberg-Selove (1926–2012), American nuclear physicist
- Alan Aisenberg (born 1993), American actor

== See also ==
- Eizenberg
