= Warkocz, Lower Silesian Voivodeship =

Warkocz
- Village
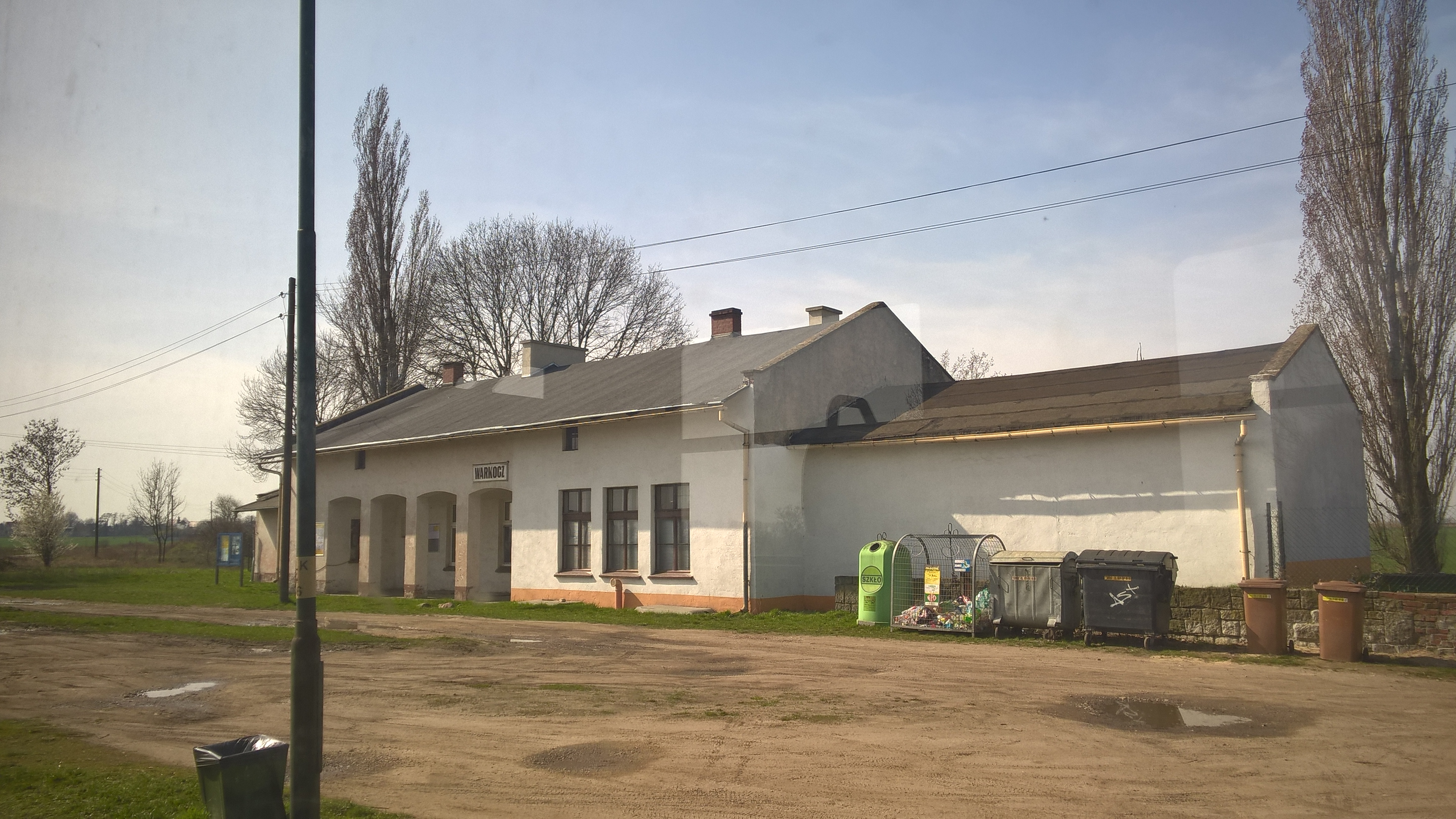
- Railway station

- Location within Poland
- Coordinates: 50°49′N 17°3′E
- Country: Poland
- Voivodeship: Lower Silesian
- County: Strzelin
- Gmina: Strzelin

Warkocz [ˈvarkɔt͡ʂ] is a village in the administrative district of Gmina Strzelin, within Strzelin County, Lower Silesian Voivodeship, in south-western Poland.
