= Brożec, Lower Silesian Voivodeship =

Brożec
- Village
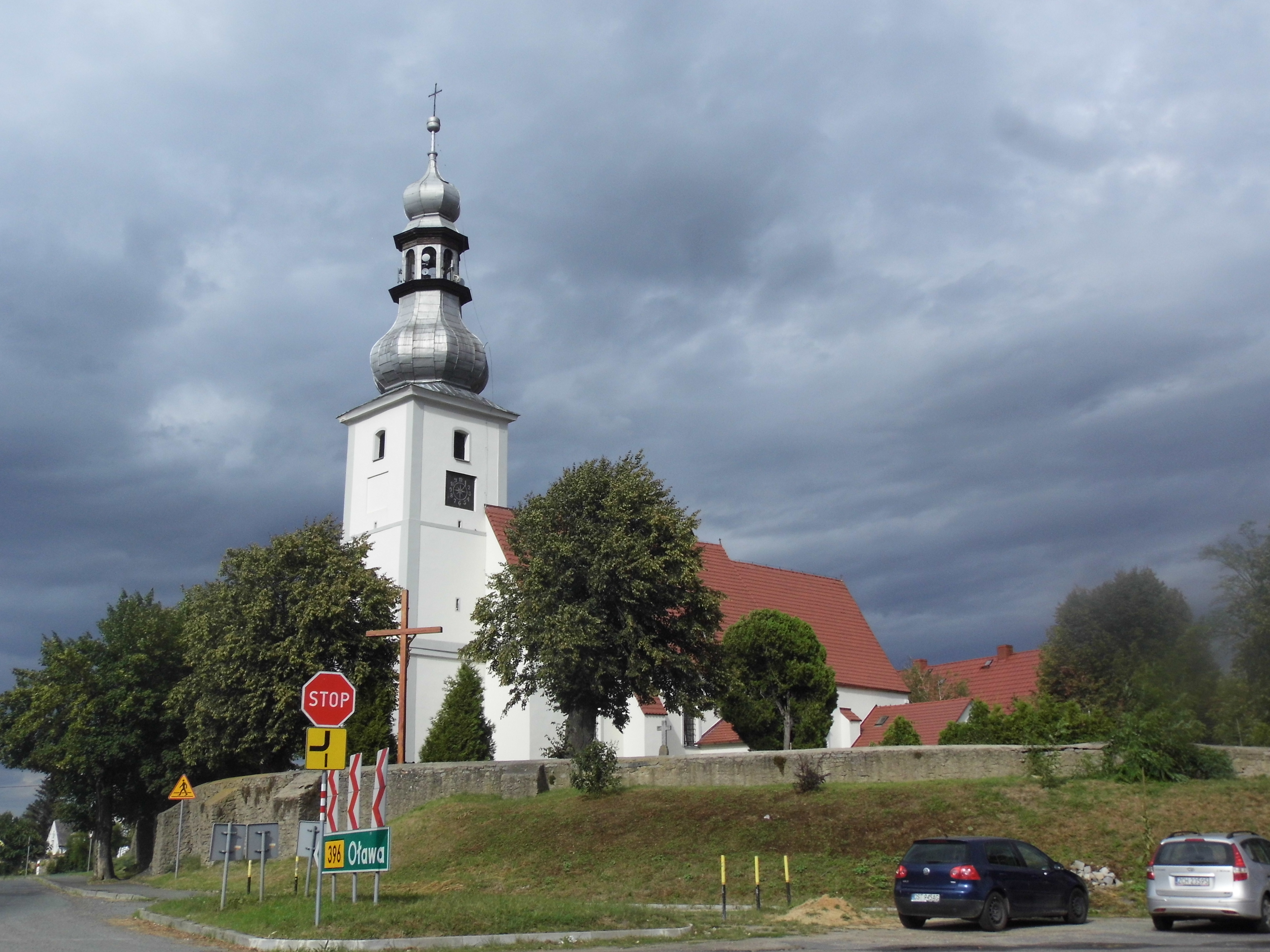
- Catholic church

- Location within Poland
- Coordinates: 50°49′06″N 17°07′59″E
- Country: Poland
- Voivodeship: Lower Silesian
- County: Strzelin
- Gmina: Strzelin
- Population: 296

Brożec [ˈbrɔʐɛt͡s] is a village in the administrative district of Gmina Strzelin, within Strzelin County, Lower Silesian Voivodeship, in south-western Poland.
