= Żeleźnik =

- Village
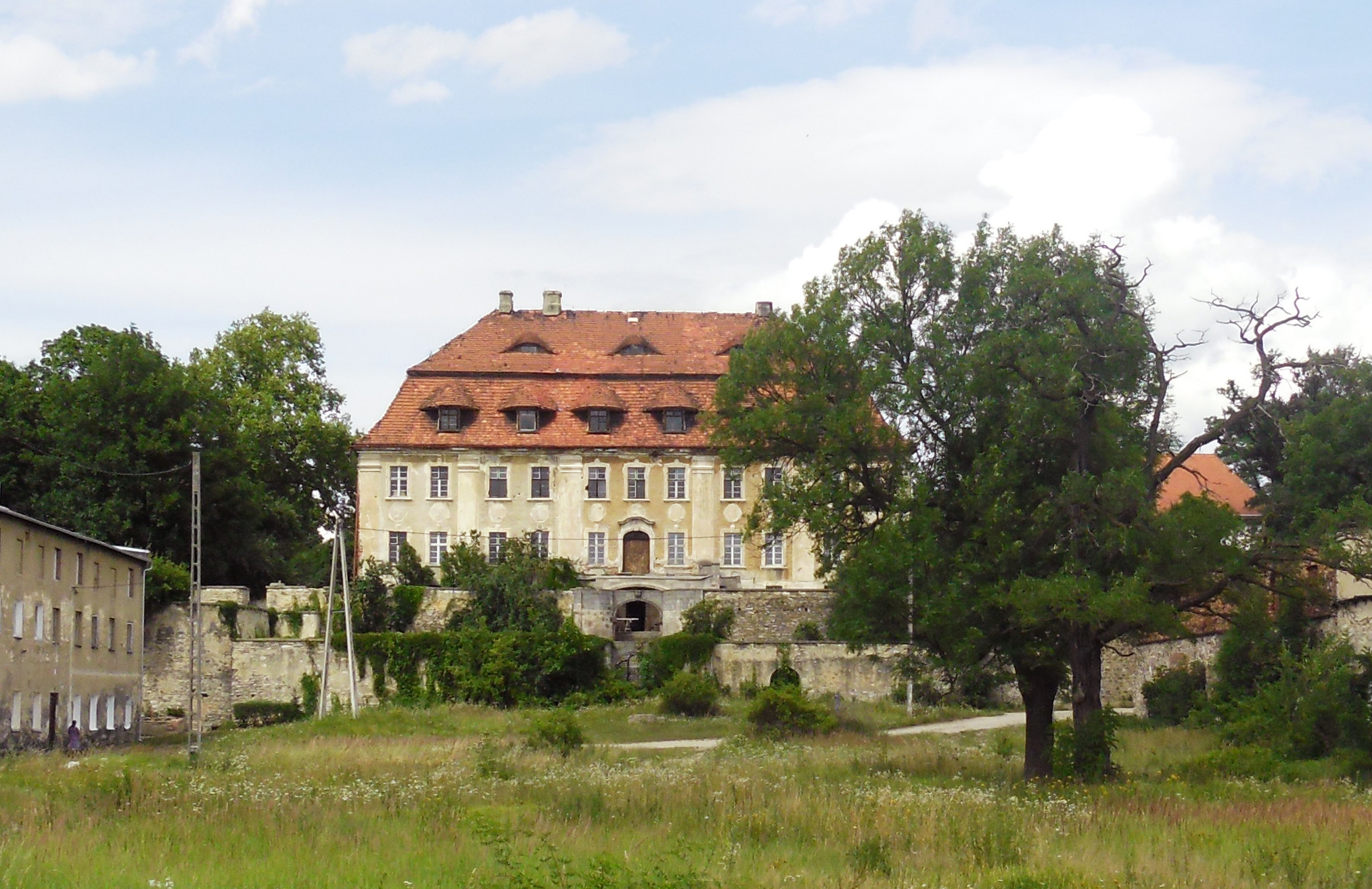
- Palace

- Location within Poland
- Coordinates: 50°44′30″N 17°10′45″E
- Country: Poland
- Voivodeship: Lower Silesian
- County: Strzelin
- Gmina: Strzelin
- Population (approx.): 100

Żeleźnik [ʐɛˈlɛʑnik] is a village in the administrative district of Gmina Strzelin, within Strzelin County, Lower Silesian Voivodeship, in south-western Poland.
