= Myszkowice, Lower Silesian Voivodeship =

Myszkowice
- Village
- Location within Poland
- Coordinates: 50°41′50″N 16°57′33″E
- Country: Poland
- Voivodeship: Lower Silesian
- County: Strzelin
- Gmina: Strzelin

Myszkowice [mɨʂkɔˈvit͡sɛ] is a village in the administrative district of Gmina Strzelin, within Strzelin County, Lower Silesian Voivodeship, in south-western Poland.
