= Ulsza =

- Village
- Location within Poland
- Coordinates: 50°48′17″N 17°06′30″E
- Country: Poland
- Voivodeship: Lower Silesian
- County: Strzelin
- Gmina: Strzelin
- Time zone: UTC+1 (CET)
  - Summer (DST): UTC+2 (CEST)
- Vehicle registration: DST

Ulsza is a village in the administrative district of Gmina Strzelin, within Strzelin County, Lower Silesian Voivodeship, in south-western Poland.

On 1 January 2019, the official name of the village was changed from Ulica to Ulsza.
