= Gmina Strzelin =

Gmina Strzelin Strzelin Commune
- Gmina
- Flag Coat of arms
- Interactive map of Gmina Strzelin
- Coordinates (Strzelin): 50°47′N 17°04′E
- Country: Poland
- Voivodeship: Lower Silesian
- County: Strzelin
- Seat: Strzelin
- Sołectwos: Biały Kościół, Biedrzychów, Bierzyn, Brożec, Chociwel, Częszyce, Dankowice, Dębniki, Dobrogoszcz, Gębczyce, Gębice, Gęsiniec, Głęboka, Górzec, Gościęcice, Karszów, Karszówek, Kazanów, Krzepice, Kuropatnik, Ludów Polski, Mikoszów, Muchowiec, Nieszkowice, Nowolesie, Pęcz, Piotrowice, Pławna, Skoroszowice, Strzegów, Szczawin, Szczodrowice, Trześnie, Warkocz, Wąwolnica, Żeleźnik

Area
  - Total: 171.69 km^{2} (66.29 sq mi)

Population (2019-06-30)
  - Total: 22,167
  - Density: 129.11/km^{2} (334.39/sq mi)
  - Urban: 12,460
  - Rural: 9,707
- Website: http://www.strzelin.pl

Gmina Strzelin is an urban-rural gmina (administrative district) in Strzelin County, Lower Silesian Voivodeship, in south-western Poland. Its seat is the town of Strzelin, which lies approximately 39 kilometres (24 mi) south of the regional capital Wrocław. It is part of the Wrocław metropolitan area.

The gmina covers an area of 171.69 square kilometres (66.3 sq mi), and as of 2019 its total population is 22,167.

== Neighbouring gminas ==
Gmina Strzelin is bordered by the gminas of Borów, Ciepłowody, Domaniów, Kondratowice, Przeworno, Wiązów and Ziębice.

== Villages ==
Apart from the town of Strzelin, the gmina contains the villages of Biały Kościół, Biedrzychów, Bierzyn, Brożec, Chociwel, Częszyce, Dankowice, Dębniki, Dobrogoszcz, Gębczyce, Gębice, Gęsiniec, Głęboka, Gliczyna, Góra, Górzec, Gościęcice, Grabiny, Kaczów, Karszów, Karszówek, Kazanów, Krzepice, Kuropatnik, Ludów Polski, Maszyce, Mikoszów, Mojków, Muchowiec, Myszkowice, Nieszkowice, Nowolesie, Pęcz, Piotrowice, Pławna, Skoroszowice, Strzegów, Szczawin, Szczodrowice, Trześnie, Ulsza, Warkocz, Wąwolnica, Żeleźnik and Zimne Doły.

== Twin towns – sister cities ==
Gmina Środa Śląska is twinned with:

- Frankenberg, Germany
- Libchavy, Czech Republic
- Straelen, Germany
- Svitavy, Czech Republic
- Trutnov, Czech Republic
