= Eisenberg Paris =

French fragrance brand

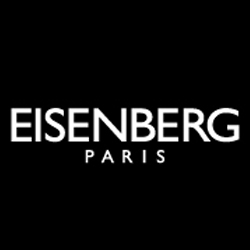
- Industry: Cosmetics
- Founder: José Eisenberg
- Key people: José Eisenberg; Edmond Eisenberg

Eisenberg Paris is a French skincare, make-up and fragrance brand for women and men that was founded by José Eisenberg in 2000.

== History ==
In 2000, José Eisenberg launched his brand, which he called José Eisenberg. He shortened the brand's name to Eisenberg the following year. José Eisenberg is involved in every creation and the day-to-day operations of the brand along with his son, Edmond.

== Collaborations ==
Brazilian artist Juarez Machado was commissioned to illustrate in paintings each fragrance of L'Art du Parfum collection. His artworks adorning the collection’s packaging.
