= Hessenberg =

Hessenberg may refer to:

People:

- Gerhard Hessenberg (1874–1925), German mathematician
- Karl Hessenberg (1904–1959), German mathematician and engineer
- Kurt Hessenberg (1908–1994), German composer and professor at the Hochschule für Musik und Darstellende Kunst in Frankfurt am Main

Mathematics:

- Hessenberg matrix, one that is "almost" triangular
- Hessenberg variety, a family of subvarieties of the full flag variety which are defined by a Hessenberg function h and a linear transformation X
