= Sylwester Porowski =

Polish physicist

- Born: April 7, 1938 (age 88); Bierzyn, Lower Silesian Voivodeship, Poland
- Education: University of Warsaw
- Known for: Blue laser build with GaN monocrystals
- Awards: Prize of the Foundation for Polish Science (2013)
- Scientific career
- Fields: Optoelectronics, solid-state physics
- Workplaces: Polish Academy of Sciences

Sylwester Andrzej Porowski (born April 7, 1938, in Bierzyn, Lower Silesian Voivodeship), is a Polish physicist specializing in solid-state and high pressure physics. He is the co-director and board member of The Institute of High Pressure Physics, Polish Academy of Sciences in Warsaw.

In 2001 Professor Porowski's team built the blue semiconductor laser, a pioneering feat in the study of optoelectronics.

Porowski was awarded Prize of the Foundation for Polish Science in 2013 for developing a high-pressure method for producing gallium nitride monocrystals.
