= Institute of High Pressure Physics of the Polish Academy of Sciences =

Polish research institute

- Founded: 1972
- Location: Warsaw
- Coordinates: 52°14′20″N 20°57′32″E
- Website: http://www.unipress.waw.pl/

Institute of High Pressure Physics, also known as Unipress (Polish: Instytut Wysokich Ciśnień Polskiej Akademii Nauk) is a scientific institute founded in 1972 by the Polish Academy of Sciences (PAN).

== Main fields of activity ==
- Biological materials
- Food preservation
- High-pressure instrumentation
- Nanocrystalline materials
- Optoelectronics
- Semiconductors
- Superconductors

== Notable people ==
- Sylwester Porowski
