= Eisenberg an der Raab =

Coordinates: 46°54′24″N 16°08′31″E

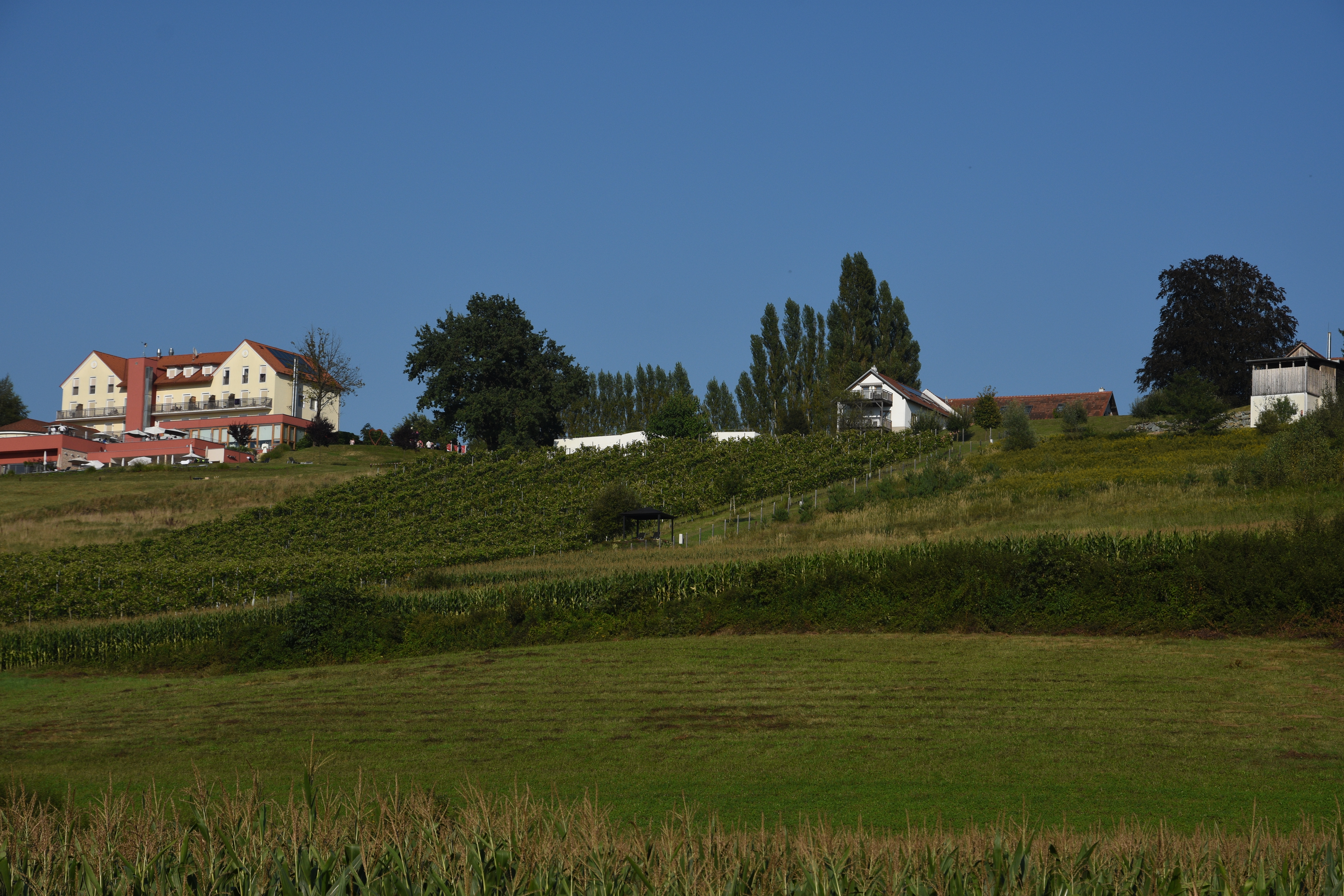
View of Eisingen

Eisenberg an der Raab is a small village in Burgenland, Austria and a part of the municipality of Sankt Martin an der Raab, near the Slovenian and Hungarian borders.
