= Sonja Eisenberg =

American abstract painter

- Born: 1926; Berlin, Germany
- Died: 2017-01-04
- Known for: abstract expressionist watercolor and oil paintings
- Website: www.sonjaeisenberg.net

Sonja Eisenberg (née Weinberger) (1926-4 January 2017) was an American abstract painter, known for her abstract expressionist watercolor and oil paintings.

Eisenberg was born in Berlin and fled Nazi Germany with her family and came to New York where she lived and worked. Her work was heavily inspired by her son, Ronald who at a young age was diagnosed with leukemia.

Eisenberg's works exhibit a progression from dark to light;- an emotional quality of her work that seems to correspond to her optimistic look at life. She focuses on the sensual nature of art, aiming to illustrate her life and feelings through a combination of harmonious colors and smooth textures. Trained in music and dance at the Juilliard School of Performing Arts, Eisenberg is in tune with her own method of abstraction, translating her personal experience into her works— among them, watercolors, pastels, oils and collages.

In the words of author and lecturer Olivier Bernier of the Metropolitan Museum of Art, "That her technique is dazzling goes without saying: these transparent mists, these vaporous distances, these infinitely subtle shades which appear in her work seem as if nature itself had made them; but then great art always seem inevitable. We are offered a series of voluptuous pleasures as we look at the wealth of details; and that is as it should be. Other artists might think that, alone, as a sufficient achievement. Eisenberg knows better: even as her work seduces the eye, it speaks to the soul; and that is why it will remain after so much else is forgotten."

Eisenberg is represented by the Leonard Tourne Gallery.

Eisenberg is the niece-in-law of Denise Rich (Eisenberg)

== Life ==
Eisenberg was born in Berlin, Germany in 1926. Her father manufactured butter and owned 100 dairy stores in Berlin. The family fled to the United States in 1938 to escape the Nazis. Having little money to survive, her father went out looking for a job while her family sold buttons and bobby pins to local stores. Her father's success in Europe landed him a job offer of $100 a week selling Polish ham in the United States.

Eisenberg suffered from Guillain–Barré syndrome, a condition that caused her excruciating pain for much of her life. In fact, all of the paintings in her 1970 First One Woman Show at the Bodley Gallery in New York were painted in bed. In 1959, her first of four children, Ronald, was stricken with leukemia and died at the age of 12. Shortly after Ronald's death, his younger brother Ralph bought Eisenberg a watercolor set and asked her for a painting for his 10th birthday. Several years later, Eisenberg started making watercolors and using oils, pastels and other media. When she couldn't paint with large strokes, she made collages out of tiny pieces of paper.

Eisenberg's husband decided it might help her overcome her grief if they moved from their dark apartment on 86th street into a new building on the corner of Park Avenue and 85th Street. She and her beau, to whom her carpenter introduced her after her husband died, brought out countless notebooks and portfolios of her works, many of which are on her website. She died at home with her family on January 4, 2017.

== Selected press ==
Sonja Eisenberg sat down in an interview with Ralph Gardner Jr. of The Wall Street Journal in her Park Avenue apartment— almost a year after she missed her 2011 Spring show at the Leonard Tourne Gallery because she was too sick to attend. He stated, "I learned that the story of her life, if not her art, is a struggle against sickness and tragedy that she invariably manages to surmount. Eisenberg's story also appeared in The Daily Tuna and was recognized by Art Slant, and Archives of American Art.

== Selected collections ==
Sonja Eisenberg's works are part of several public collections including the Omega Institute, New Lebanon, New York; Anglo- American Art Museum, Baton Rouge, Louisiana; Huntsville Museum of Art, Huntsville, Alabama; Palm Springs Desert Museum, Palm Springs, California; Accademia Italia delle Arti e del Lavoro, Italy; Archives of American Art, Smithsonian Institution in Washington, D.C.; and World Federation of United Nations Association, United Nations Headquarters, where she contributed artwork to several first-day-of-issue stamps.

== Exhibitions ==
In 1970, Sonja Eisenberg had her first solo show at the Bodley Gallery in New York where she successfully sold 17 paintings. In 1974, Eisenberg's paintings were widely publicized in the press after her solo exhibition at the Buyways Gallery in Sarasota, Florida. The Sarasota Herald Tribune describes Eisenberg's paintings to have a "…subtle, sophisticated communications of universal existence— balanced visual poetry capturing the essences of thought, objects, nature, and man."

Other notable solo and group exhibition shows include, Galerie Art du Monde, Paris, France (1972); Galerie de Sfinx, Amsterdam, Netherlands (1974); Cory Galleries, San Francisco, California (1979); The Cathedral of St. John the Divine, New York, New York (1983); Park Hotel Gallery, Buergenstock, Switzerland (1994); Dussman Kulturhaus, Berlin, Germany (1998); International Show Eternal Eve, Jaffa Museum of Antiquities, Tel Aviv, Israel (2010); and Spring at the Leonard Tourne Gallery in New York, New York (2012), featuring a collection of watercolors spanning several periods throughout her artistic career.

== Awards and recognition ==
- 1993 "Die Kristallnacht" Painting chosen by Briefmarkenhaus Krueger for Lithographs and Telephone cards, Munich, Germany
- 1984 Maestro Accademico Badriacense, Italy
- 1984 Artist in Residence, The Cathedral of St. John the Divine, New York, New York
- 1983 Gold medal for artistic merit, International Parliament for Safety and Peace
- 1981 Gold medal- Accademia Italia delle Arti e del Lavoro, Parma Italy
- 1975 American Watercolor society, Traveling Exhibition

== Books ==
- 2005 "On its Way" (based on the I Ching)
- 2004 "Soon"
- 2003 "Seeing the Gospel according to St. John"
- 2001 "Poems and Paintings"

== Design ==
Eisenberg has designed numerous posters and magazine covers. Her work been exhibited widely across the United States and in France, Israel, Japan, Amsterdam, Austria, England, Switzerland and her native Germany. Eisenberg became the WFUNA Cachet designer for the United Nations in 1977 and returned in 1981 to design the United Nations International Year of the Disabled persons cover for "Discovering Fire for the Second Time." From 1991 to 1997, she designed the cover of three monthly magazines: "Ziekenhuis & Instelling," in Amsterdam, Netherlands.

== Sources ==
- Gardner Jr., Ralph (3 October 2012). "Choosing Brightness Over Despair". The Wall Street Journal.
- "Sonja Eisenberg Resume" (PDF). Sonja Eisenberg.
- "Selected Critical Assessments" (PDF). Sonja Eisenberg.
- Yoakam, Anna. "Sonja Eisenberg - from Penniless to Penthouse". The Daily Tuna Blog Spot.
