= Gęsiniec =

- Village
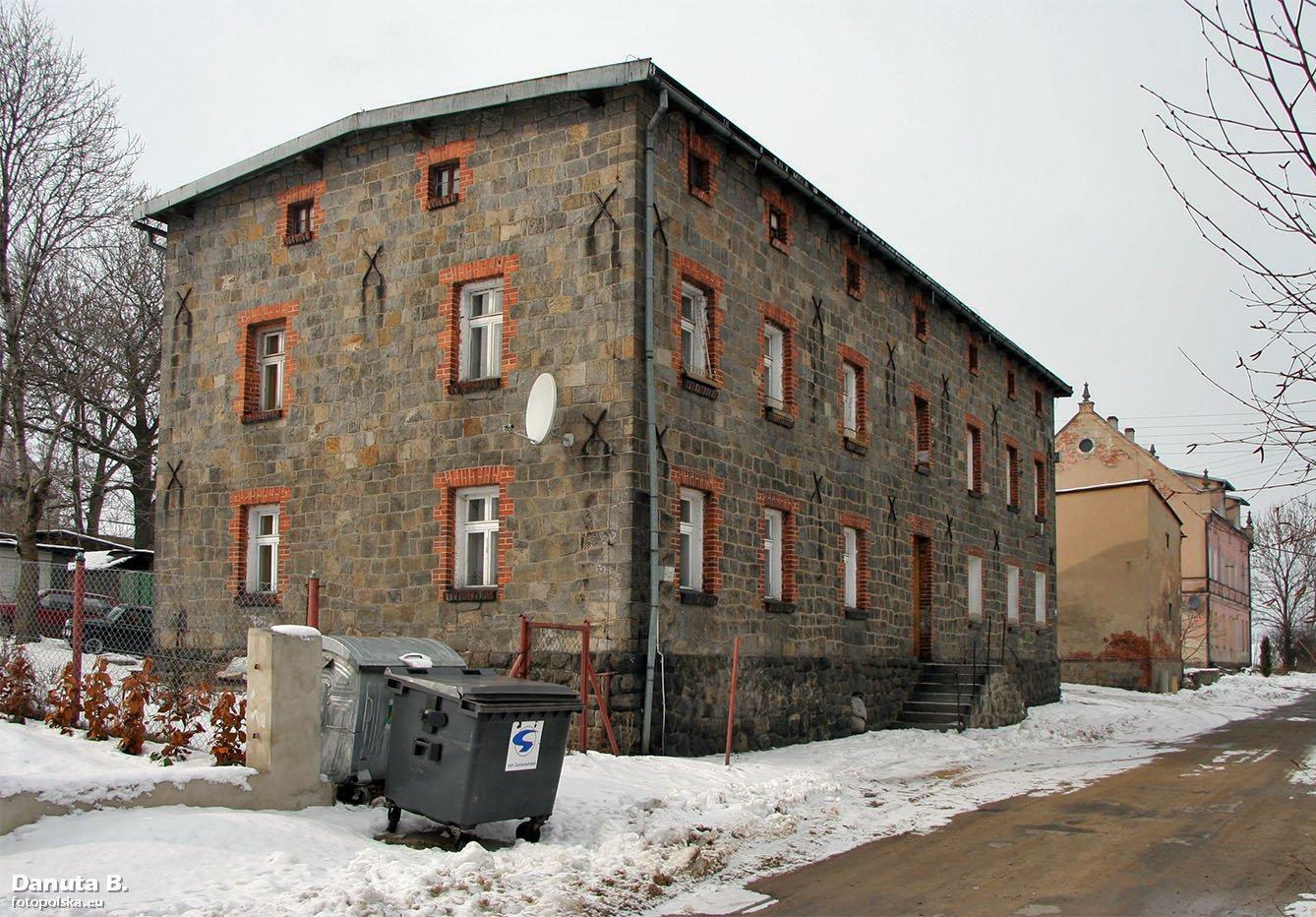

- Location within Poland
- Coordinates: 50°45′57″N 17°04′16″E
- Country: Poland
- Voivodeship: Lower Silesian
- County: Strzelin
- Gmina: Strzelin

Gęsiniec ([ɡɛ̃ˈɕiɲɛt͡s]) is a village in the administrative district of Gmina Strzelin, within Strzelin County, Lower Silesian Voivodeship, in south-western Poland. From 1867 to 1945, it was in Germany.

Gęsiniec was settled in 1750 by Hussites, whose religious faith was based on the writings of Jan Hus (ca. 1369–1415), a Czech religious reformer and priest who was burnt at the stake as a heretic. Its former name, Husinec, refers to the Hus′ birthplace. Historically, the town's residents had ethnic Czech roots. It is located in Silesia, a region once ruled by the Kingdom of Bohemia, and after 1526 part of the Habsburg Monarchy. Silesia was conquered by Prussia in the First Silesian War in 1742, codified by the Treaty of Hubertusburg in 1763, and the town became known as Hussinetz. From 1813 to 1919, it was administered by the Prussian Province of Lower Silesia in the political subdivision Regierungsbezirk Breslau.

In 1937, shortly after Adolf Hitler's rise to power, its name was changed to Friedrichstein. The village and its region were joined to Poland following the defeat of Nazi Germany in 1945, and its name was changed once again to Gęsiniec. The town's German-speaking population was expelled in totality.

A monument commemorating residents of Gęsiniec who died in the First World War stands in what was the central part of the village.
