= José Eisenberg =

Italian entrepreneur

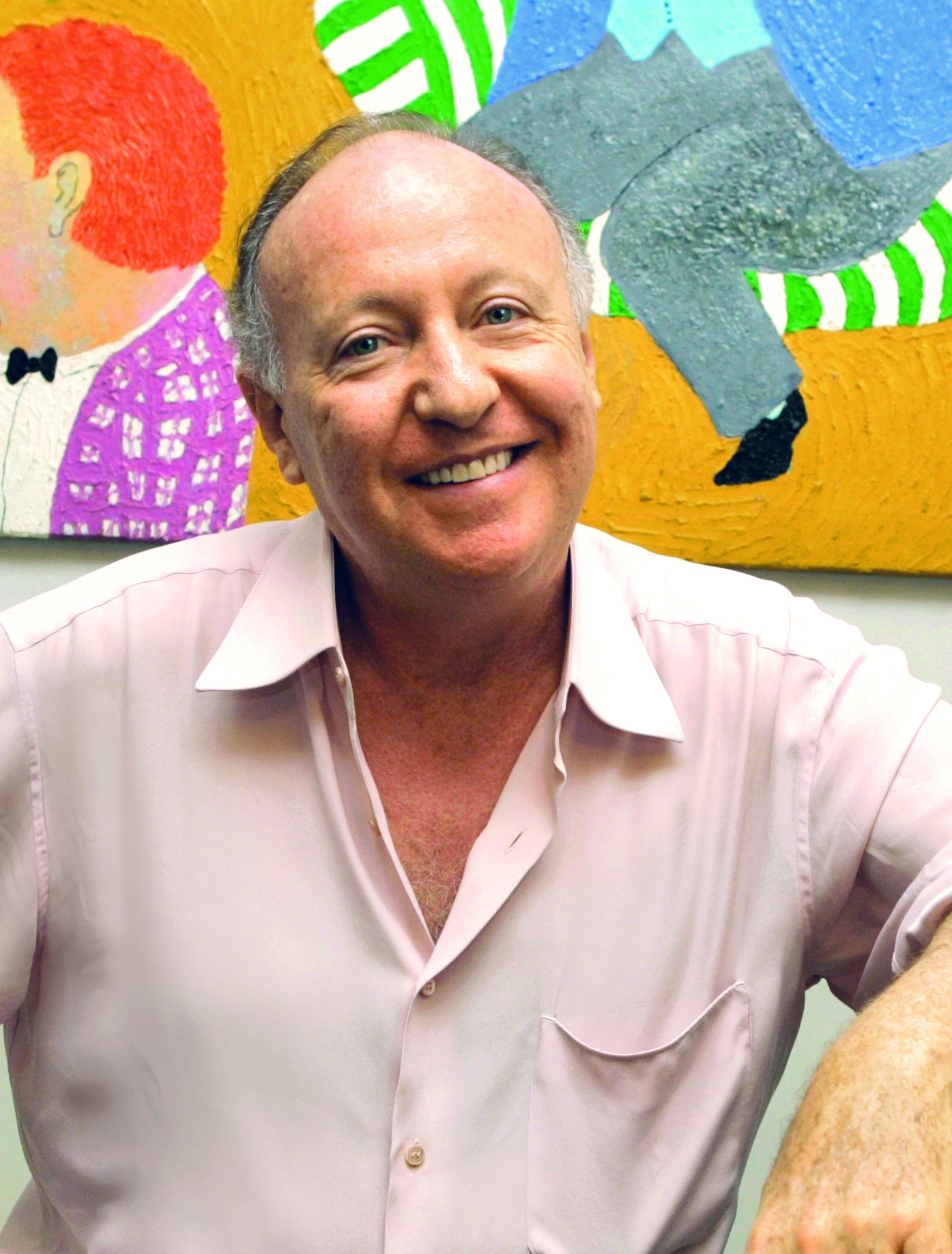
- Born: 20 August 1945 (age 80)
- Occupation: Entrepreneur
- Children: 3
- Website: www.eisenberg.com

José Eisenberg (born 20 August 1945) is an Italian entrepreneur and founder of Eisenberg Data Systems.

== Early life and education ==
Born August 20, 1945, in post-war Bucarest, José Eisenberg comes from a long line of textile manufacturers. He is the only son of Sally and Marcel Eisenberg.

He spent his childhood in Romania during the communist post-war era. His family's homes, businesses, and possessions were confiscated by the new political regime.

At age 13, he left school and held several jobs: newspaper deliveryman, poster maker, and handyman in workshops which still employed Renaissance art-making techniques.

== Entrepreneurship ==
At age 21, José Eisenberg established his own fashion design studio and factory in Florence, Italy. He designed his own creations and produced collections for known fashion names. He is a pioneer of the democratisation of fashion in Europe. In 1972, Italy awarded him honorary citizenship for his immense contribution to the industrialisation of the Basilicata region.

Without abandoning his fashion design roots, José Eisenberg embarked on his second entrepreneurial project in 1974, investing time, energy and resources into artificial intelligence research, still in its infancy at the time. He founded JE Contrex in Boston, recruiting graduates from the Massachusetts Institute of Technology. Though JE Contrex was able to successfully develop a functioning artificial eye, work had to be abandoned due to the slow processing speed of the era's computers.

In 1976, he launched a second technology company, Eisenberg Data Systems (E.D.S.). E.D.S developed and marketed computers, including one with a detachable keyboard.

== Eisenberg Paris ==
In 1985, José Eisenberg entered the beauty industry.

In 2000, Eisenberg launched his brand, José Eisenberg Paris, shortening the brand's name to Eisenberg the following year.

José Eisenberg remains involved in the day-to-day operations of the brand. In addition to skincare products, he has also created two perfume collections and a range of smart cosmetics which infuse make-up with skincare benefits, providing a single-step ‘make-care’ solution.

== Personal life ==
José Eisenberg has three children, two daughters and a son.

His son, Edmond, joined Eisenberg Paris in 2011. Together, they steer the direction of the brand's product development and global development strategies. Edmond Eisenberg has said:

Eisenberg is primarily a family business. This allows us to remain faithful to my father's authentic vision, to his values, and to be free and independent to maintain our authenticity.

— "Art meets Beauty: la visione di Edmond Eisenberg". Man In Town (in Italian).
