= Strzelin County =

Coordinates: 50°47′N 17°04′E

Strzelin County Powiat strzeliński
- County
- Flag Coat of arms

- Location within the voivodeship
- Country: Poland
- Voivodeship: Lower Silesian
- Seat: Strzelin
- Gminas: Total 5: Gmina Borów; Gmina Kondratowice; Gmina Przeworno; Gmina Strzelin; Gmina Wiązów

Area
  - Total: 622.27 km^{2} (240.26 sq mi)

Population (2019-06-30)
  - Total: 43,713
  - Density: 70.248/km^{2} (181.94/sq mi)
  - Urban: 14,701
  - Rural: 29,012
- Car plates: DST
- Website: www.powiatstrzelinski.pl

Strzelin County [ˈstʂɛlʲin] (Polish: powiat strzeliński) is a unit of territorial administration and local government (powiat) in Lower Silesian Voivodeship, south-western Poland. It came into being on January 1, 1999, as a result of the Polish local government reforms passed in 1998. The county covers an area of 622.3 square kilometres (240.3 sq mi). Its administrative seat is the town of Strzelin, and its only other town is Wiązów.

As of 2019 the total population of the county is 43,713, out of which the population of Strzelin is 12,460, that of Wiązów is 2,241, and the rural population is 29,012.

== Neighbouring counties ==
Strzelin County is bordered by Wrocław County to the north, Oława County to the north-east, Brzeg County to the east, Nysa County to the south, Ząbkowice County to the south-west and Dzierżoniów County to the west.

== Administrative divisions ==
The county is subdivided into five gminas (two urban-rural and three rural). These are listed in the following table, in descending order of population.

Gmina	Type	Area (km^{2})	Population (2019)	Seat
Gmina Strzelin	urban-rural	171.7	22,167	Strzelin
Gmina Wiązów	urban-rural	141.8	7,174	Wiązów
Gmina Borów	rural	98.7	5,294	Borów
Gmina Przeworno	rural	112.0	4,786	Przeworno
Gmina Kondratowice	rural	98.1	4,292	Kondratowice
