= Rosa (given name) =

Rosa is a female given name, especially in the Spanish, Portuguese, and Italian languages.

Notable people with the name include:

- Archduchess Rosa of Austria (1906–1983), Austrian princess
- Rosa Albach-Retty (1874–1980), Austrian film and stage actress
- Rosa Asmundsen (1846–1911), Norwegian actress and singer
- Rosa Bailly (1890–1976), French journalist and poet
- Rosa Balistreri (1927–1990), Sicilian musician
- Rosa Benozzi Balletti (1701–1758), Italian-French actress
- Rosa Blasi (born 1972), American actress
- Rosa Bonheur (1822–1899), French artist
- Rosa Bouton (1860–1951), American chemist and professor
- Rosa Cedrón (born 1972), Spanish Galician singer and cellist
- Rosa Cobo Bedía (born 1956), Spanish feminist, writer, and professor
- Rosa de Carvalho Alvarenga (fl. 1857), African slave trader
- Rosa de Montúfar (1783–1860), Ecuadorian independence figure
- Rosa DeLauro (born 1943), American politician
- Rosa Díez (born 1952), Spanish politician
- Rosa Diletta Rossi (born 1988), Italian actress
- Rosa Donato (1808–1867), Italian revolutionary from Sicily
- Rosa Egipcíaca (1719–1771), Brazilian writer
- Rosa Eriksen (born 1990), Danish politician
- Rosa Errera (1864–1946), Italian writer
- Rosa Estebanez (1927–1991), Cuban-born American sculptor
- Rosa Faccaro (1931–2019), Argentine art critic, painter and university teacher
- Rosa Fuentes (born 1965), Mexican swimmer
- Rosa Guerra (1834–1864), Argentine educator, journalist, writer
- Rosa Gumataotao Rios (born 1965), American government official
- Rosa Horn (1880–1976), American preacher and church leader
- Rosa Howlett (1863–1961), British artist and suffragette
- Rosa Janku (1882–1944) Austrian resistance fighter during World War II
- Rosa Jochmann (1901–1994), Austrian resistance activist and Ravensbrück survivor who became a politician (SPÖ)
- Rosa Junck (1850–1929), Czech Esperantist, educator, translator and opera singer
- Rosa Kerschbaumer-Putjata (1851–1923), Russian-Austrian ophthalmologist who was the first female doctor in Austria
- Rosa Kershaw Walker (1840s–1909), American author, journalist, newspaper editor
- Rosa Koian, human rights and environmentalism activist from Papua New Guinea
- Rosa Leal de Pérez (1953–2025), Guatemalan psychologist
- Rosa Lemberg (1875–1959), a Namibian-born Finnish American teacher, singer and choral conductor
- Rosa López (born 1981), also known as Rosa, a Spanish singer and dancer
- Rosa Louise Woodberry (1869–1932), American journalist, educator
- Rosa Loy (born 1958), German illustrator and painter
- Rosa Lund (born 1986), Danish politician
- Rosa Luxemburg (1871–1919), Polish communist leader
- Rosa Maria Gilart Jiménez (1810–1880), Spanish embroiderer
- Rosa Maria Rössler (1901–1954) Austrian-born Turkish medical doctor and translator
- Rosa Mayreder (1958–1938), Austrian freethinker, author, painter, musician and feminist
- Rosa Mbinge-Tjeundo (born 1972), Namibian politician
- Rosa Mendes (born 1979), half Costa Rican and half Czech professional wrestler
- Rosa Menga (born 1992), Italian politician
- Rosa Miller Avery (1830–1894), American abolitionist, political reformer, suffragist, writer
- Rosa Monfasani (born 1944), Argentine librarian and educator
- Rosa Mota (born 1958), Portuguese marathoner
- Rosa Navarro (born 1955), Colombian photographer and artist
- Rosa Nissán (born 1939), Mexican writer
- Rosa Nouchette Carey (1840–1909), English children's writer and popular novelist
- Rosa O'Neill (1588/90–1660), Irish wife of Owen Roe O'Neill
- Rosa Ohliger (died 1929), German murder victim of Peter Kürten
- Rosa Orellana, American mathematician
- Rosa Palomino (1951–2022), Aymara Indigenous leader in Peru
- Rosa Parks (1913–2005), American civil rights icon
- Rosa Petit, Venezuelan politician
- Rosa Ponselle (1897–1981), American operatic soprano
- Rosa Quintana (born 1959), Spanish civil servant and politician
- Rosa Regàs, Spanish writer
- Rosa Robson (born 1992), English actress and comedian
- Rosa Rosà (1884–1978), Austrian writer
- Rosa Russo Iervolino (born 1936), Italian politician
- Rosa Scarlatti (1727–1775), Italian opera singer
- Rosa Schupbach (1928–2022), Iranian-Swiss-American economist
- Rosa Silvana Abate (born 1963), Italian politician
- Rosa Simonovich (born 1850), first Ukrainian woman to earn a medical degree from University of Bern
- Rosa Stallbaumer (1887–1942), member of the Austrian Resistance during World War II
- Rosa Valetti (1876–1937), German actress, cabaret performer and singer
- Rosa Vecht (1881–1915), Dutch nurse
- Rosa Vercellana (1833–1885), known as "Rosina" or "La Bela Rosin", mistress and later wife of Victor Emmanuel II, King of Italy
- Rosa von Praunheim (1942–2025), German filmmaker and gay rights activist
- Rosa Warrens (1821–1878), Swedish poet and translator
- Rosa Yolanda Villavicencio (born 1962), Colombian economist and politician
- Rosa Young (1890–1971), American educator
- Roza Kostandyan (born 2000), know professionally as Rosa Linn, Armenian singer-songwriter

== Middle name ==
- María Rosa Gallo, Argentinian actress

== Fictional characters ==
- Colonel Rosa Klebb, the main antagonist of Ian Fleming's Bond novel, and subsequent film, From Russia, With Love
- Princess Rosa Cossette D'Elise, character in the video game Ace Combat 7: Skies Unknown
- Rosa (Castlevania), reluctant vampire in the video game Castlevania
- Rosa (Kizuna Encounter), the wild woman from the game Kizuna Encounter
- Rosa Casagrande, a character in The Casagrandes
- Rosa Cruz, a character in the British comic book series MPH
- Rosa del Valle, also known as Rosa the Beautiful, character in the novel The House of the Spirits by Isabel Allende
- Rosa Diaz, character in the television series Brooklyn Nine-Nine
- Rosa Farrell, character in the game Final Fantasy IV
- Rosa Hubermann, Hans Hubermann's wife and Liesel Meminger's foster mother in The Book Thief.
- Rosa Ushiromiya, character of Sound Novel Umineko no Naku Koro ni
- Rosa, a character in the 1990 American action comedy movie Kindergarten Cop.
- Rosa, a teal crane chugger from Sanlocomota, who is also a recolor of Skylar.
- Rosa, the female protagonist of Pokémon Black 2 and White 2
- Rosariki, a character in the Russian animated children's television series GoGoRiki
- Rosa, a bat and one of the main protagonists of Car Seat Headrest's rock opera album The Scholars

== See also ==
- Rosa (cow) (2001–2020), Spanish-born French cow and television personality
- Rosa (sea otter) (born 1999), the oldest known living sea otter at the time of her death
- Rosa (surname)
- Rosalind (disambiguation)
- Rosamund
