= Slesa (disambiguation) =

Slesa may mean:

- Slesa, a ruined castle in Georgia
- Ślęża, a mountain in Poland
- Ślęza, a river in Poland
