= Ślęza (disambiguation) =

The Ślęza is a river in Lower Silesia, Poland.

Ślęza or Ślęża may also refer to:

- Ślęza, Lower Silesian Voivodeship, a village in Lower Silesia
- Ślęża, a mountain in Lower Silesia
  - Ślęża Landscape Park, a protected area around Mount Ślęża
- Ślęża Massif, a mountain in Lower Silesia
