= Michalovice =

Michalovice may refer to places in the Czech Republic:

- Michalovice (Havlíčkův Brod District), a municipality and village in the Vysočina Region
- Michalovice (Litoměřice District), a municipality and village in the Ústí nad Labem Region
- Michalovice, a village and part of Mladá Boleslav in the Central Bohemian Region
  - Michalovice Castle
- Michalovice, a village and part of Petrovice I in the Central Bohemian Region

== See also ==
- Michalovce, Slovakia
- Michałowice (disambiguation)
