= Rößler =

Rößler is a surname and may refer to:

- Hole Rößler (born 1949), German modern pentathlete
- Matthias Rößler (born 1955), German politician (CDU)
- Robert Rößler (1838–1883), German poet
- Rößler firearms, an Austrian firearms manufacturer

== See also ==
- Rössler
- Roessler
- Roeseler
