= Rössler =

Rössler is a surname and may refer to:

- Ervin Rössler (1876–1933), Croatian zoologist
- Fritz Rössler (1912–1987), German Nazi politician
- Günter Rössler (1926–2012), German photographer and photo-journalist
- Jaroslav Rössler (1902–1990), Czech photographer
- Otto Rössler (born 1940), German biochemist
- Rosa Maria Rössler (1901–1954), Austrian-born Turkish medical doctor and translator
- Willi Rössler (1924–2007), German fencer

== See also ==
- Rößler
- Roessler
- Roeseler
- Rössler attractor
