= Albert Eulenburg =

German neurologist

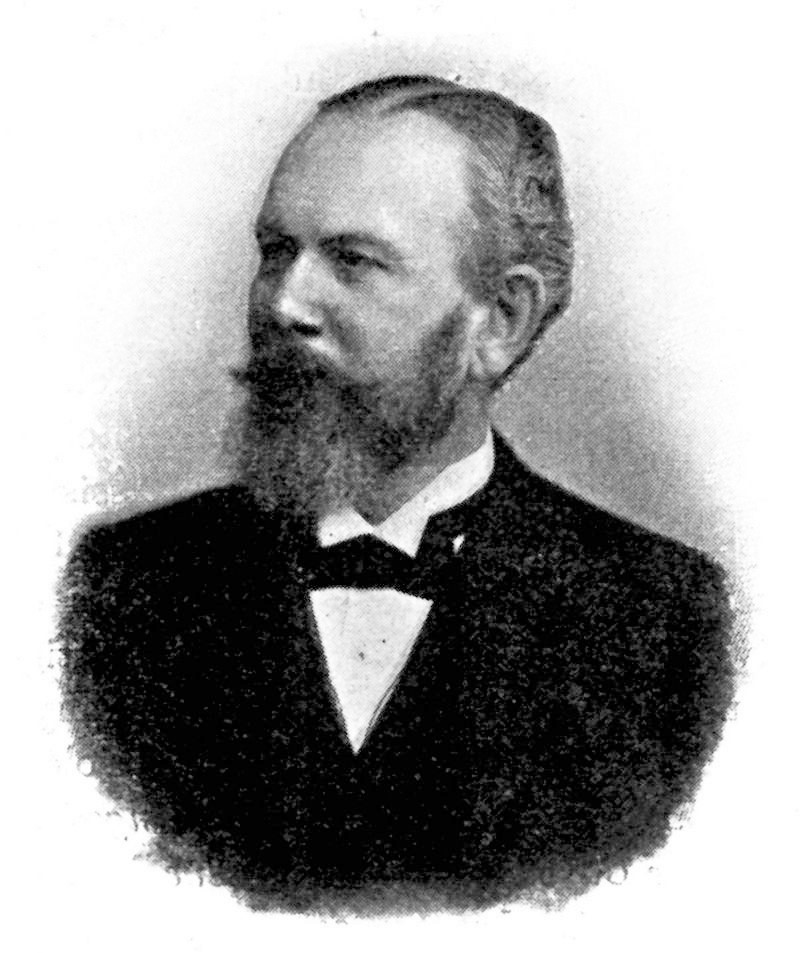
Albert Eulenberg (1840–1917)

Albert Eulenburg (German pronunciation: [ˈalbɛʁt ˈʔɔʏln̩bʊʁk]; 10 August 1840 – 3 July 1917) was a German neurologist born in Berlin.

== Education ==
Born into a Jewish family, he studied medicine at the Universities of Berlin, Bern and Zurich, earning his doctorate in 1861. Among his instructors were Johannes Peter Müller (1801–1858), Ludwig Traube (1818–1876) and Albrecht von Graefe (1828–1870). Later he became a professor of pharmacology at the University of Greifswald, and in 1882, a professor of neurology in Berlin.

== Career ==
Eulenburg is remembered for his written works. His most ambitious work being the multi-volume Real-Encyclopädie der gesammten Heilkunde, which was published in four editions between 1880 and 1914. Later in his career he became interested in the field of sexology, and was co-editor of the journal Zeitschrift für Sexualwissenschaft. In 1902 Eulenburg penned a work on algolagnia, titled Sadismus und Masochismus (Sadism and Masochism).

=== Publications ===
Other principal writings by Eulenburg include:

- Lehrbuch der functionellen Nervenkrankheiten auf Physiologischer Basis. 1871, Page 712: Parry–Romberg syndrome.
- Pathologie des Sympathicus. Prize-winning paper, with Paul Guttmann (1834–1893). Berlin, 1873.
- Handbuch der allgemeinen Therapie und der therapeutischen Methodik. with Simon Samuel (1833–1899). three volumes, Berlin/Vienna, 1898–1899.
- Der Marquis de Sade. Vortrag gehalten im Psychologischen Verein in Berlin. First published in the journal Zukunft on March 25, 1899.
- Lehrbuch der klinischen Untersuchungsmethoden und ihrer Anwendung auf die specielle ärztliche Diagnostik. with Wilhelm Kolle (1868–1935) and Wilhelm Weintraud (1866–1920). Contains a number of treatises on methods of investigating the blood by Kolle and Ernst Grawitz (1860–1911), 1904–05.

Many of his publications dealt with the physiological side of neurology, about which, he conducted studies involving the vasomotor centers of the brain. He was the first to describe a rare neuromuscular condition known as paramyotonia congenita, a disorder sometimes referred to as "Eulenburg's disease".

In 1913, along with Magnus Hirschfeld (1868–1935) and Iwan Bloch (1872–1922), he founded the Ärztliche Gesellschaft für Sexualwissenschaft und Eugenik.
