= Michaela Di Donna =

Italian politician (born 1977)

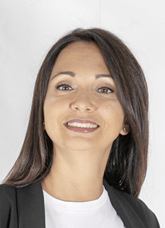

Member of the Chamber of Deputies
- In office 13 July 2022 – 13 October 2022

Personal details
- Born: 29 September 1977 (age 48) Foggia, Apulia, Italy
- Party: Forza Italia (2018-2020); League (2020-2022); Union of the Centre (from 2023)
- Education: University of Foggia
- Profession: Lawyer, professor

Michaela Di Donna (born 29 September 1977) is an Italian politician who served as a Deputy from 13 July to 13 October 2022.

== Biography ==
Graduated in law, she has worked as a lawyer since 2004 and has taught art market legislation at the Academy of Fine Arts in Foggia and the Academy of Fine Arts in Macerata. She is sister-in-law of Franco Landella, husband of her sister Daniela and mayor of Foggia from 2014 to 2021.

She ran with Forza Italia for the Chamber of Deputies in the Puglia constituency in the 2018 elections, ranking first among the unelected behind Elio Vito in the proportional level. She was also a candidate in the uninominal constituency of Foggia, finishing second behind the 5 Star Movement candidate Rosa Menga.

In 2020 she abandoned Forza Italia together with Landella, following her party's refusal to nominate her for the regional elections: she then joined the League, supporting Joseph Splendido's candidature for councillor.

Following the resignation of Elio Vito, in disagreement with the overly extremist political line taken by Forza Italia, Di Donna succeeded him as MP on 13 July 2022.

In 2023 she joined the Union of the Centre.
