= Menga =

Menga is a Kongo and Italian surname. Notable people with this family name include:

- Addy-Waku Menga (born 1983), German footballer from DR Congo
- Aleixo-Platini Menga (born 1987), German sprinter from Angola
- Dolly Menga (born 1993), Angolan footballer
- Evangelista Menga (1480–1571), Italian military engineer
- Rosa Menga (born 1992), Italian politician
- Vanessa Menga (born 1976), Brazilian tennis player
