= Leonora Speyer =

American violinist and poet (1872–1956)

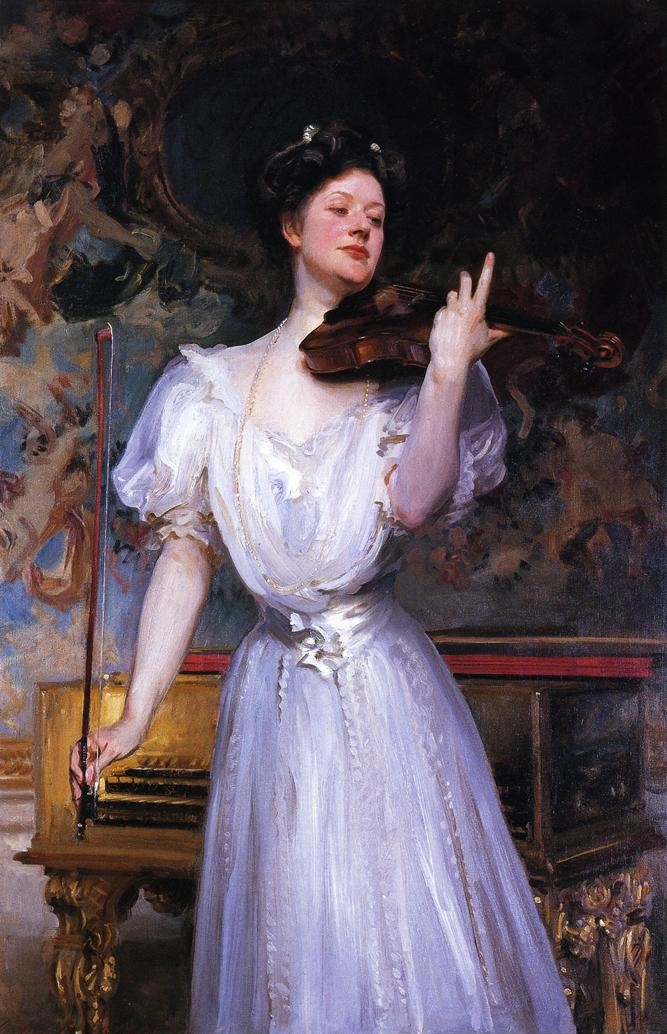
- Lady Speyer by John Singer Sargent, 1907
- Born: 7 November 1872; Washington, D.C., U.S.
- Died: 10 February 1956 (aged 83); New York, U.S.
- Occupations: Violinist; Poet
- Spouses: Louis Howland (m. 1894–1902) Edgar Speyer (m. 1902; died 1932)
- Children: 4

Leonora Speyer, Lady Speyer (née von Stosch; 7 November 1872 – 10 February 1956), was an American poet and violinist.

== Life ==
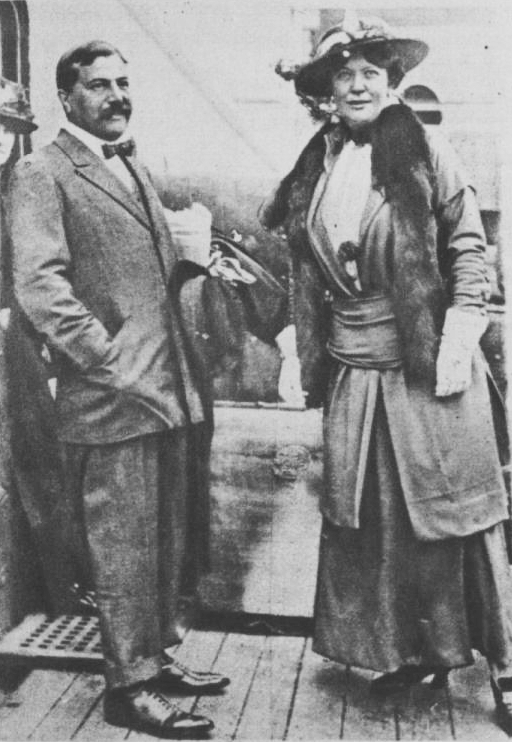
Leonora Speyer and her husband Sir Edgar Speyer, circa 1921

She was born in Washington, D.C., the daughter of Count Ferdinand von Stosch of Manze in Silesia, who fought for the Union in the American Civil War, and Julia Schayer, who was a writer.

She studied music in Brussels, Paris, and Leipzig, and played the violin professionally under the batons of Arthur Nikisch and Anton Seidl, among others. She first married Louis Meredith Howland in 1894, but they divorced in Paris in 1902. She then married banker Edgar Speyer (later Sir Edgar), of London, where the couple lived until 1915.

Sir Edgar had German ancestry and following anti-German attacks on him that year, they moved to the United States and took up residence in New York, where Speyer began writing poetry. She won the 1927 Pulitzer Prize for Poetry for her book of poetry Fiddler's Farewell.

She had four daughters: Enid Howland with her first husband and Pamela, Leonora, and Vivien Claire Speyer with her second husband.

== Awards ==
- Golden Rose Award
- Pulitzer Prize

== Legacy ==
- American composer Gertrude Martin Rohrer (1875–1968) used Speyer’s text for her vocal quartet Wood-nymph.

== Selected works ==
- "April on the Battlefields", The Second Book of Modern Verse (1919). about.com
- "A Note from the Pipes", The Second Book of Modern Verse (1919). about.com
- "Suddenly", Anthology of Magazine Verse for 1920, Bartleby.com
- "Song", Anthology of Magazine Verse for 1920, Bartleby.com
- Oberammergau, etched, printed and bound by Bernhardt Wall, 1922, 50 copies plus 3 Etcher's Copies
- American Poets, An Anthology Of Contemporary Verse (1923)
- Fiddler's Farewell (1926) (full text at Wikisource and Project Gutenberg)
- Slow Wall; poems, new and selected (1939)
- Slow wall; poems, together with Nor without music (1944)

=== Translation ===
- Hans Trausil (1919). Holy Night; A Yule-Tide Masque. Sunwise Turn.
