= Jelenin =

Jelenin may refer to the following places in Poland:

- Jelenin, Lower Silesian Voivodeship (south-west Poland)
- Jelenin, Lubusz Voivodeship (west Poland)
- Jelenin, West Pomeranian Voivodeship (north-west Poland)
