= Michałowice =

Michałowice may refer to the following places in Poland:

- Michałowice, Kłodzko County in Lower Silesian Voivodeship (south-west Poland)
- Michałowice, Strzelin County in Lower Silesian Voivodeship (south-west Poland)
- Michałowice, Gmina Długołęka in Lower Silesian Voivodeship (south-west Poland)
- Michałowice, Gmina Sobótka in Lower Silesian Voivodeship (south-west Poland)
- Michałowice, Piechowice in Lower Silesian Voivodeship (south-west Poland)
- Michałowice, Łódź Voivodeship (central Poland)
- Michałowice, Lesser Poland Voivodeship (south Poland)
- Michałowice, Świętokrzyskie Voivodeship (south Poland)
- Michałowice, Grójec County in Masovian Voivodeship (east-central Poland)
- Michałowice, Pruszków County in Masovian Voivodeship (east-central Poland)
- Michałowice, Opole Voivodeship (south Poland)

== See also ==
- Michalovice (disambiguation)
