= Opatowice =

Opatowice may refer to the following places in Poland:

- Opatowice, Lower Silesian Voivodeship (south-west Poland)
- Opatowice, Kuyavian-Pomeranian Voivodeship (north-central Poland)
