= Świnobród =

Świnobród may refer to the following places in Poland:

- Świnobród, Lower Silesian Voivodeship (south-west Poland)
- Świnobród, Podlaskie Voivodeship (north-east Poland)
