= Mała Ślęza =

Location
- Country: Poland
- Voivodeship: Lower Silesian

Physical characteristics
- Source
  - location: south of Kobyla Głowa, Ząbkowice County
  - coordinates: 50°39′02″N 16°52′42″E
  - elevation: 324 m (1,063 ft)
- Mouth: Ślęza
  - location: east of Bartoszowa, Strzelin County
  - coordinates: 50°53′06″N 16°58′48″E
- Length: 40.7 km (25.3 mi)

Basin features
- Progression: Ślęza→ Oder→ Baltic Sea

Mała Ślęza is a river of Poland, a tributary of the Ślęza near Bartoszowa. It is 40.7 km long.

== History ==
The name was established in 1951, replacing the previous German name Kleine Lohe.

In the 2000s, the construction of a dam in the Maleszów region, 11.11 meters high and 338 meters long, was planned. The created retention reservoir was to have a usable capacity of 2.3 million m³ and a total capacity of 5.6 million m³.
