= Roessler =

Roessler is a surname. Notable people with the surname include:

- Carol Roessler (born 1948), American politician
- Henri Roessler (1910–1978), French football player and manager
- Kira Roessler (born 1962), American bass guitarist, singer and Emmy award-winning dialogue editor
- Oscar F. Roessler (1860-1932), American politician
- Pat Roessler, American baseball coach
- Paul Roessler (born 1958), American punk rock musician
- Rudolf Roessler (1897–1958), German spy for the Soviet Union

== See also ==
- Rößler
- Rössler
- Roeseler
- Bridgeport Roesslers
