= Kazimierzów, Lower Silesian Voivodeship =

Kazimierzów
- Village
- Location within Poland
- Coordinates: 50°51′50″N 17°01′32″E
- Country: Poland
- Voivodeship: Lower Silesian
- County: Strzelin
- Gmina: Borów

Kazimierzów [kaʑiˈmjɛʐuf] is a village in the administrative district of Gmina Borów, within Strzelin County, Lower Silesian Voivodeship, in south-western Poland.
