= Kurczów =

- Village
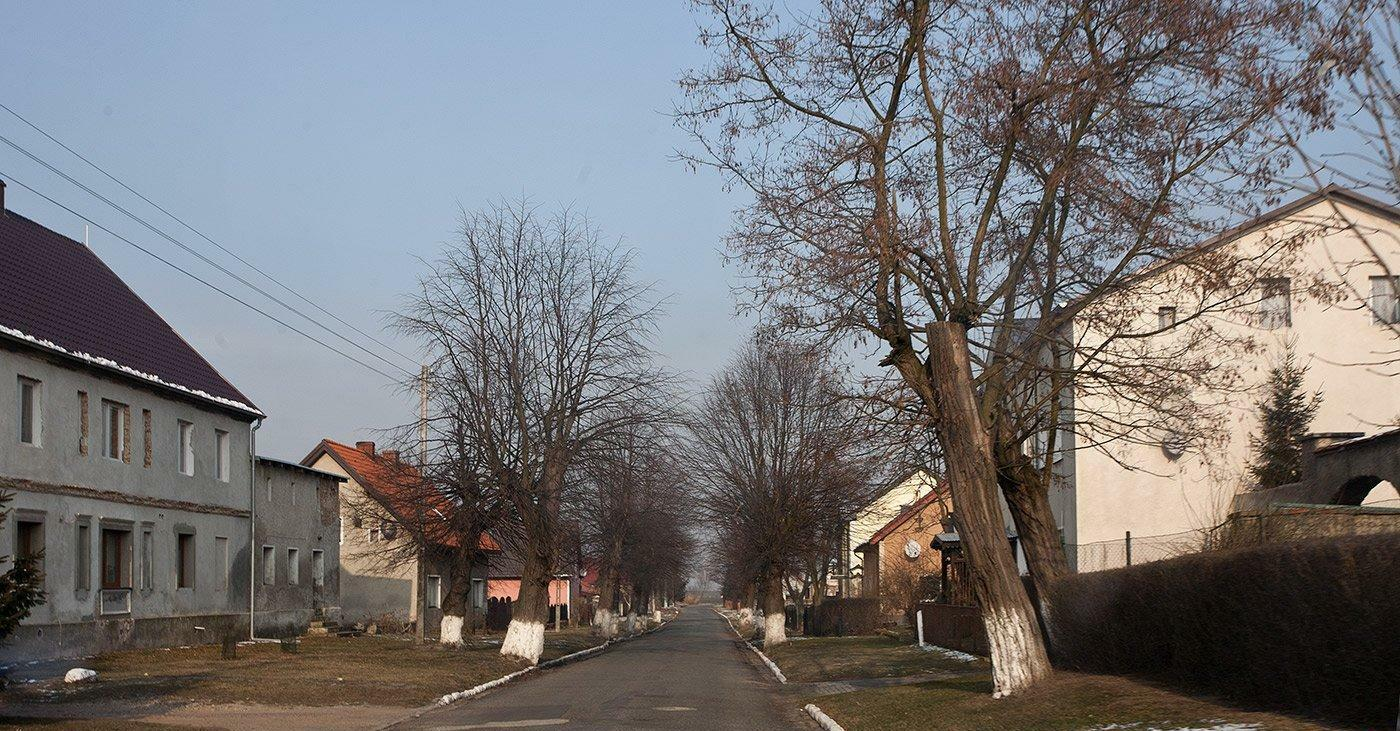

- Location within Poland
- Coordinates: 50°54′N 17°3′E
- Country: Poland
- Voivodeship: Lower Silesian
- County: Strzelin
- Gmina: Borów

Kurczów [ˈkurt͡ʂuf] is a village in the administrative district of Gmina Borów, within Strzelin County, Lower Silesian Voivodeship, in south-western Poland.
