= Borów, Strzelin County =

Borów
- Village
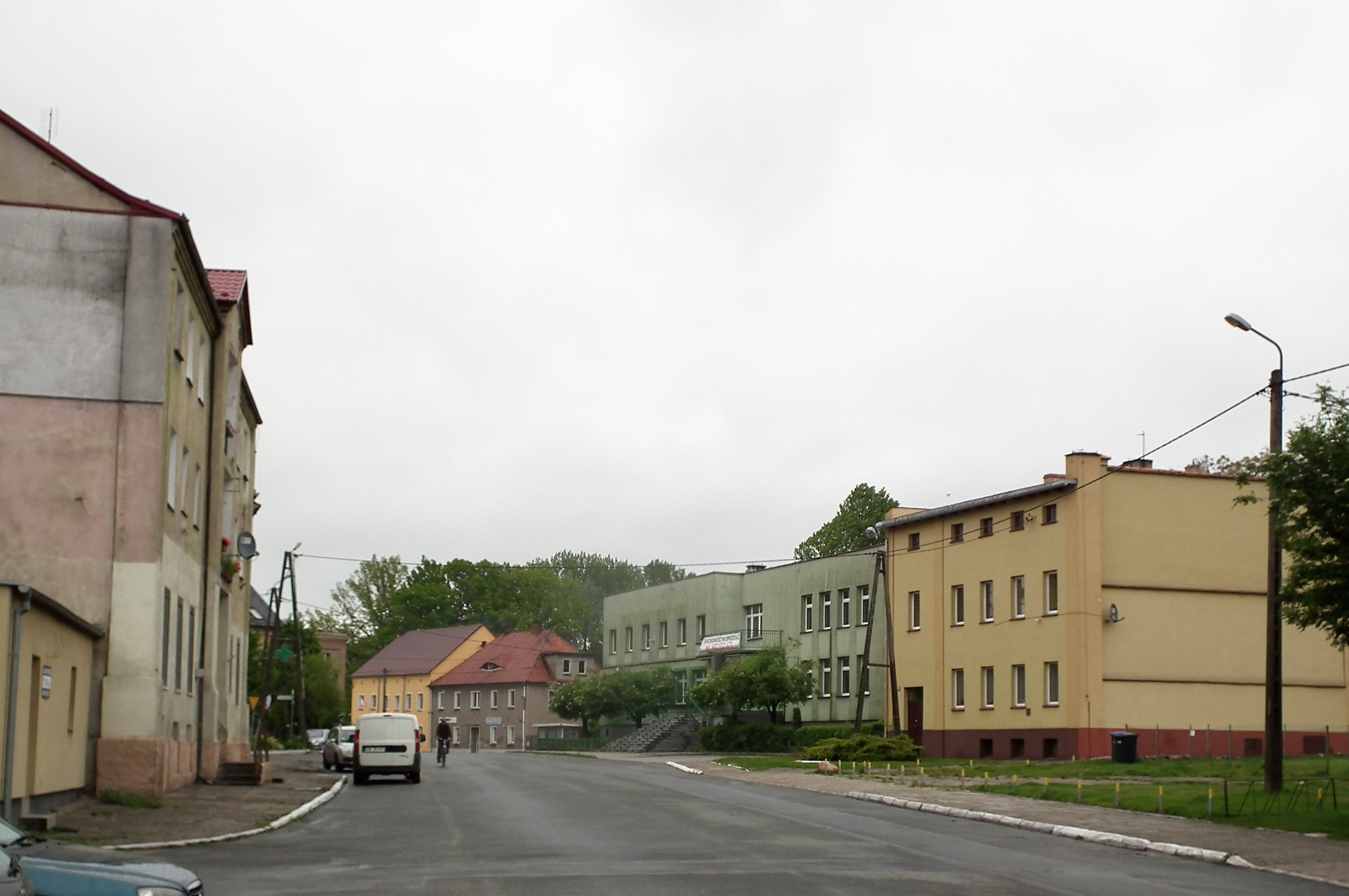

- Location within Poland
- Coordinates: 50°52′59″N 16°59′25″E
- Country: Poland
- Voivodeship: Lower Silesian
- County: Strzelin
- Gmina: Borów
- Population: 900
- Time zone: UTC+1 (CET)
  - Summer (DST): UTC+2 (CEST)
- Vehicle registration: DST

Borów [ˈbɔruf] is a village (former town) in Strzelin County, Lower Silesian Voivodeship, in south-western Poland. It is the seat of the administrative district (gmina) called Gmina Borów.
