= Piotrków Borowski =

- Village
- Location within Poland
- Coordinates: 50°52′23″N 16°58′32″E
- Country: Poland
- Voivodeship: Lower Silesian
- County: Strzelin
- Gmina: Borów

Piotrków Borowski (Polish pronunciation: [ˈpjɔtrkuv bɔˈrɔfskʲi]) is a village in the administrative district of Gmina Borów, within Strzelin County, Lower Silesian Voivodeship, in south-western Poland.
