= Kępino =

- Village
- Location within Poland
- Coordinates: 50°50′N 17°1′E
- Country: Poland
- Voivodeship: Lower Silesian
- County: Strzelin
- Gmina: Borów
- Population: 142

Kępino [kɛmˈpinɔ] is a village in the administrative district of Gmina Borów, within Strzelin County, Lower Silesian Voivodeship, in south-western Poland.
