= Boguszyce, Strzelin County =

Boguszyce
- Village
- Location within Poland
- Coordinates: 50°54′14″N 16°59′42″E
- Country: Poland
- Voivodeship: Lower Silesian
- County: Strzelin
- Gmina: Borów

Boguszyce [bɔɡuˈʂɨt͡sɛ] is a village in the administrative district of Gmina Borów, within Strzelin County, Lower Silesian Voivodeship, in south-western Poland.
