= Kojęcin =

- Village
- Location within Poland
- Coordinates: 50°51′36″N 17°05′20″E
- Country: Poland
- Voivodeship: Lower Silesian
- County: Strzelin
- Gmina: Borów

Kojęcin [kɔˈjɛnt͡ɕin] is a village in the administrative district of Gmina Borów, within Strzelin County, Lower Silesian Voivodeship, in south-western Poland.
