= Erich Frank =

German physician and internist (1884–1957)

- Born: June 28, 1884; Berlin, German Empire
- Died: February 13, 1957 (aged 72); Istanbul, Turkey
- Education: University of Breslau, University of Strasbourg
- Known for: Medical education in Turkey
- Scientific career
- Fields: Internal medicine, Diabetology, Nephrology
- Workplaces: University of Breslau, Istanbul University

Alfred Erich Frank (28 June 1884 – 13 February 1957) was a German-Jewish physician and internist. He held positions as chief physician in Breslau (now Wrocław, Poland) and professor of internal medicine at the University of Breslau and University of Istanbul. After fleeing Nazi Germany in 1933, Frank spent 23 years as director of the Second Department of Internal Medicine at Istanbul University, where he contributed to the development of internal medicine teaching in Turkey.

== Early life and education ==
Frank was born in Berlin in 1884 to Albert Frank, a Jewish merchant, and his wife Dorothea, née Jungmann. He was raised in Breslau and attended the Königliches König Wilhelms-Gymnasium, graduating in 1902.

Frank studied medicine at the University of Breslau and passed the state examination in 1907. He completed a practical year in internal medicine at the Municipal Hospital of Wiesbaden under Wilhelm Weintraud, a diabetes researcher. In 1908, he received his medical doctorate from the University of Strasbourg with the dissertation Über den genuinen orthostatischen Typ, supervised by Friedrich Moritz.

== Career ==
=== Germany (1908–1933) ===
From 1908 to 1911, Frank worked in Wiesbaden on metabolism and diabetes research. He participated in clinical testing of Salvarsan with Paul Ehrlich and published studies on experimental diabetes with Simon Isaac.

In 1911, Frank returned to Breslau to work under Oskar Minkowski, who had co-discovered the pancreatic origin of diabetes. Frank completed his habilitation in 1913 with a study on albuminuria and was appointed associate professor (extraordinarius) in 1919. He served as senior physician (Oberarzt) at Minkowski's clinic from 1918. In 1926, he became chief physician at the Wenzel-Hancke Hospital in Breslau, and in 1928 he was promoted to full professor of internal medicine at the university.

During this period, Frank published on diabetes insipidus and on hypertension. In 1926, Frank worked with Martin Nothmann and Arthur Wagner on Synthalin, an oral antidiabetic diguanidine compound.

=== Turkey (1933–1957) ===
In 1933, Frank was dismissed from his university positions under Nazi racial laws. He emigrated to Turkey with assistance from Albert Einstein and the pathologist Philipp Schwartz.

From 1934 until his death in 1957, Frank directed the Second Department of Internal Medicine at Istanbul University's Faculty of Medicine. He was accompanied by Kurt Steinitz, who managed the department's laboratory, and Elisabeth Wolff, who worked on dietary therapy.

In Istanbul, Frank published textbooks including Innere Klinik der Nierenkrankheiten (1941) and a three-volume work Klinik der Inneren Krankheiten (1951–1956), which was translated into Turkish. In 1951, he founded the journal Klinik İlim (Istanbul Journal of Clinical Medicine). Frank continued research on diabetes, publishing work on alloxan-induced diabetes in 1946. He also published Karbonhidrat Metabolizması Patolojisi in 1949. According to Ulutin and Özden, Frank served as a consultant during Mustafa Kemal Atatürk's final illness in 1938.

== Death and legacy ==
Frank died in Istanbul on 13 February 1957 at age 72 and was buried at Aşiyan Cemetery.

Teaching halls at both Istanbul University Faculty of Medicine and Bezmialem Vakıf University have been named in Frank's honor.

In 1984, the Erich Frank Society (Erich-Frank-Gesellschaft) was established at LMU Munich to promote scientific cooperation and exchange programs between Munich and Istanbul. LMU Munich awards the Erich Frank Scholarship to medical students for study visits between Munich and Istanbul.

The Turkish government issued a commemorative stamp in 2007 marking the 50th anniversary of Frank's death.

== Selected publications ==
- Über den genuinen orthostatischen Typ. Strasbourg, 1908.
- Innere Klinik der Nierenkrankheiten. 1941.
- Karbonhidrat Metabolizması Patolojisi. Istanbul, 1949.
- Klinik der Inneren Krankheiten. 3 vols., Istanbul, 1951–1956.
