= Głownin =

- Village
- Location within Poland
- Coordinates: 50°51′02″N 16°57′50″E
- Country: Poland
- Voivodeship: Lower Silesian
- County: Strzelin
- Gmina: Borów

Głownin [ˈɡwɔvnin] is a village in the administrative district of Gmina Borów, within Strzelin County, Lower Silesian Voivodeship, in south-western Poland.
