= Julia Schayer =

Julia Thompson von Stosch Schayer (January 7, 1842 – March 29, 1928) was an American writer, best known for her short stories published in the 1870s-1890s.

== Biography ==
She was born in Deering, Maine in 1842 to Zenas Thompson, a New England clergyman, and Leonara Levitt. In her youth, she was also noted for her singing voice. Schayer was married twice, first to Count Ferdinand von Stosch, who died shortly after the Civil War, and with whom she had two daughters. Her daughter Leonora Speyer was a poet (and winner of the 1927 Pulitzer Prize for Poetry) and violinist.

Her second husband was George F. Schayer, with whom she had additional children. Their son Richard Schayer was a screenwriter. George Schayer was Deputy Recorder of Deeds in Washington, D.C., where Julia befriended author Frances Hodgson Burnett.

She published short stories in publications including The Atlantic Monthly, Scribner's Monthly and The Century Magazine. Her Century stories were compiled in Tiger Lily and Other Stories published in 1883. Her 1891 Century story The Major's Appointment was adapted into a play by Nelson Wheatcroft and George Backus, which debuted at the Amphion Academy in Brooklyn in March 1892. Her Story of Two Lives (first published in Swinton's Story-teller in 1883) was adapted for an episode of the television show Your Favorite Story in 1953.

Though her writings are little considered today, her short story Molly (which was also her first literary success, published in Scribner's Monthly in 1878) has been noted approvingly for its portrayal of life in Appalachia.

Schayer died in Bronxville, New York in 1928 and is buried in Washington's Glenwood Cemetery.
