= Hugo Neumann (pediatrician) =

German-Jewish pediatrician (1858–1912)

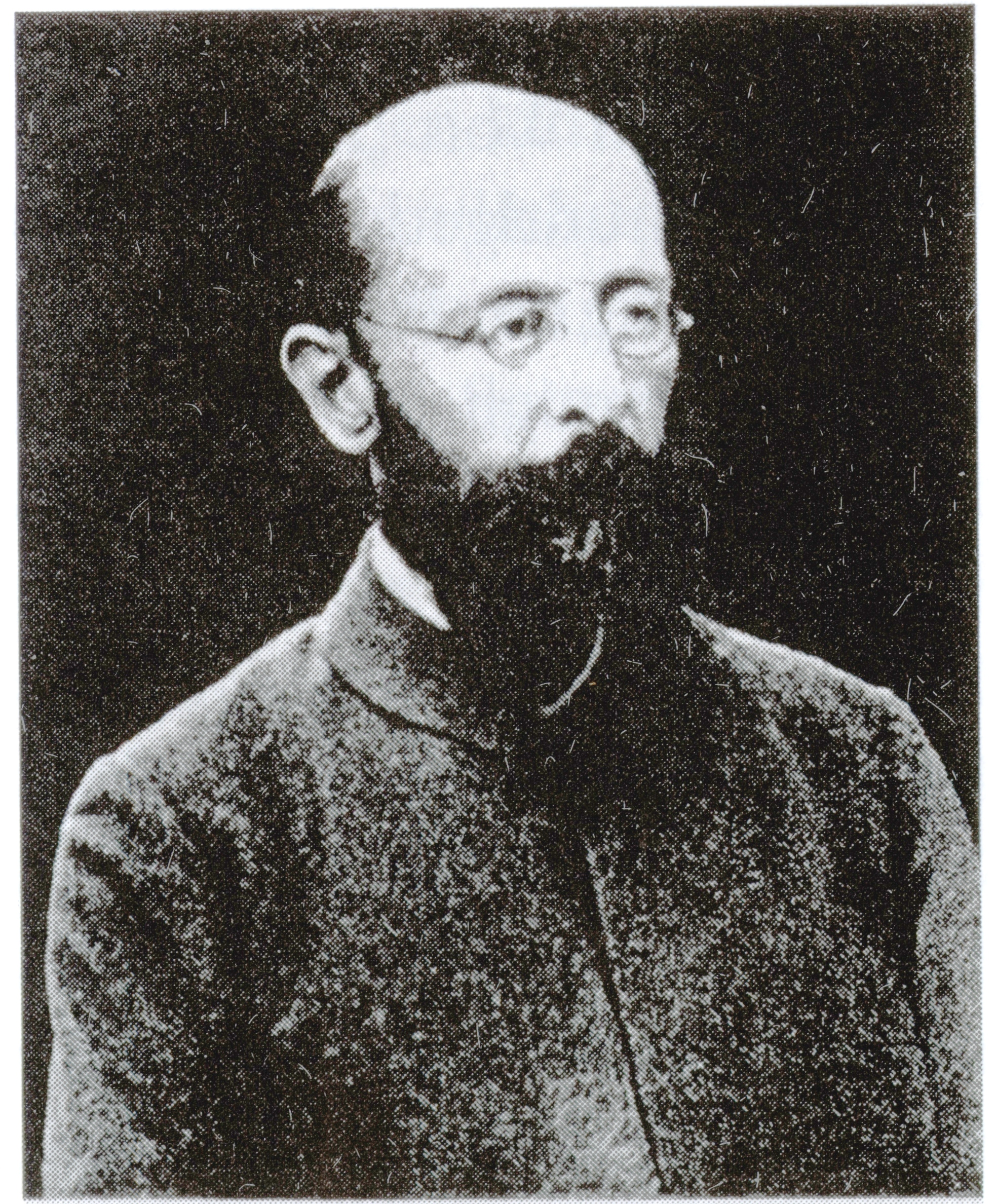
Hugo Neumann (1858-1912)

Hugo Neumann (25 October 1858 – 12 July 1912) was a German-Jewish pediatrician born in Berlin.

He studied medicine in Berlin and Heidelberg, receiving his doctorate with a thesis titled Über die Knochenbrüche bei Geisteskranken. From 1884 he worked as an assistant to Paul Guttmann (1834–1893) at the Hospital Moabit in Berlin. In 1887 he founded a private clinic for childhood diseases in Berlin.

== Written works ==
- Öffentlicher Kinderschutz volume 7: Schulhygiene und öffentlicher Kinderschutz Abt. 2. Coblentz, Berlin 1895, S. 431–687.
- Über die Beziehungen der Krankheiten des Kindesalters zu den Zahnkrankheiten. Breitkopf & Härtel, Leipzig 1897.
- Öffentliche Säuglings- und Kinderfürsorge. Allg. Med. Verl. Anst., Berlin 1909. (Public infant and child welfare)
- Die unehelichen Kinder in Berlin. Fischer, Jena 1900. (The illegitimate children in Berlin)
- Über die Behandlung der Kinderkrankheiten: H. Neumanns Briefe an einen jungen Arzt. Coblentz, Berlin 1913. (On the treatment of childhood diseases: Hugo Neumann's letters to a young doctor)
  - Books about Hugo Neumann:
- "Dr. Hugo Neumann: Ein Pionier der sozialen Kinderheilkunde" by Gerrit Kirchner (2008).
