= Boreczek, Lower Silesian Voivodeship =

Boreczek
- Village
- Location within Poland
- Coordinates: 50°52′48″N 17°1′48″E
- Country: Poland
- Voivodeship: Lower Silesian
- County: Strzelin
- Gmina: Borów
- Population: 200

Boreczek ([bɔˈrɛt͡ʂɛk]; German: Wäldchen) is a village in the administrative district of Gmina Borów, within Strzelin County, Lower Silesian Voivodeship, in south-western Poland.
