= Brzoza, Lower Silesian Voivodeship =

Brzoza
- Village
- Location within Poland
- Coordinates: 50°54′30″N 17°00′10″E
- Country: Poland
- Voivodeship: Lower Silesian
- County: Strzelin
- Gmina: Borów

Brzoza [ˈbʐɔza] (German: Groß Bresa, or 1937–1945 German: Erlebusch) is a village in the administrative district of Gmina Borów, within Strzelin County, Lower Silesian Voivodeship, in south-western Poland.
