= Jaksin =

- Village
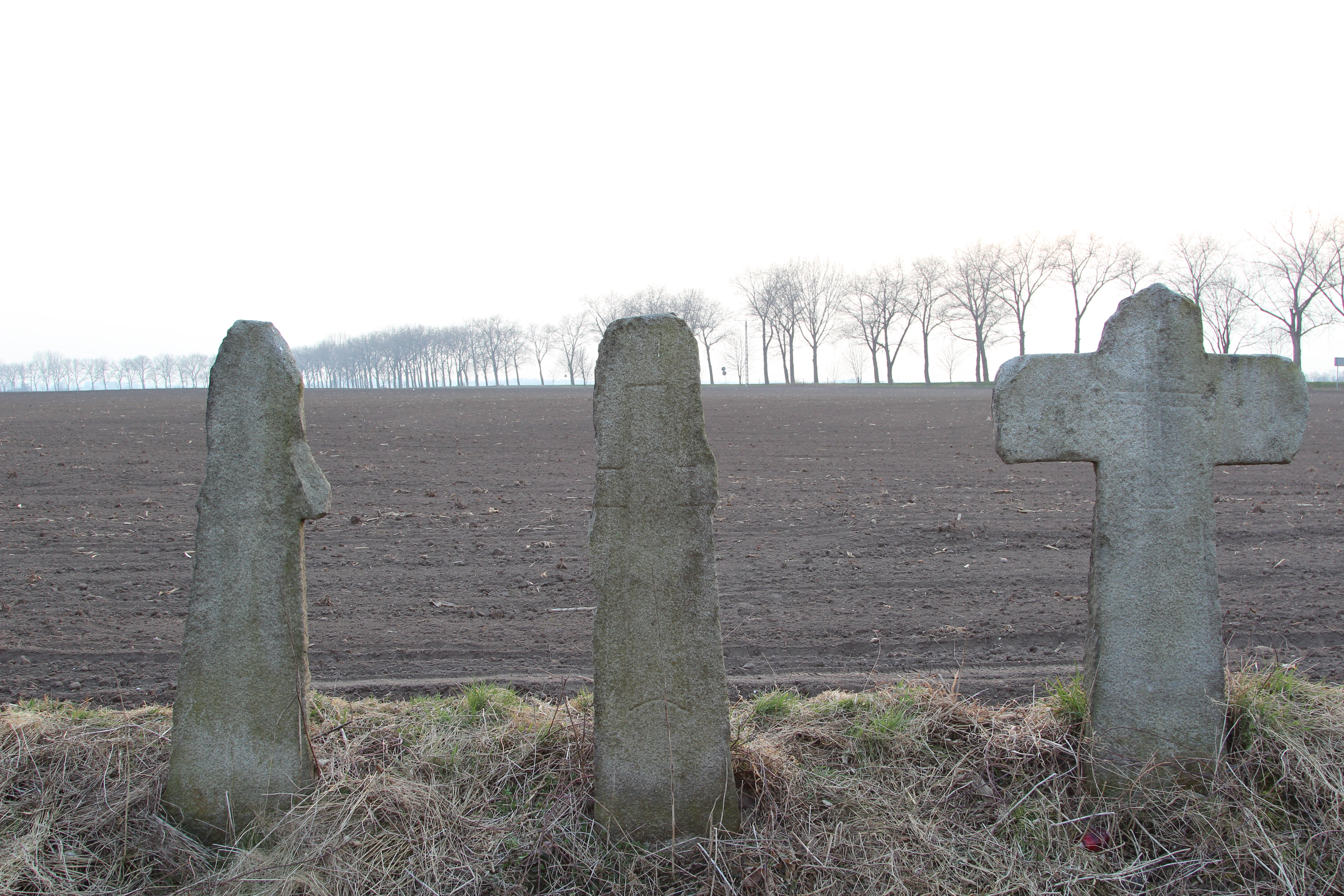
- Stone crosses

- Location within Poland
- Coordinates: 50°51′00″N 17°04′28″E
- Country: Poland
- Voivodeship: Lower Silesian
- County: Strzelin
- Gmina: Borów

Jaksin [ˈjakɕin] is a village in the administrative district of Gmina Borów, within Strzelin County, Lower Silesian Voivodeship, in south-western Poland.
