= Borek Strzeliński =

- Village
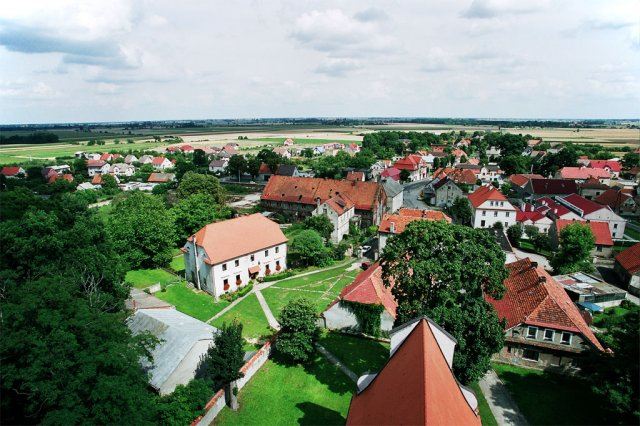

- Location within Poland
- Coordinates: 50°52′59″N 17°04′00″E
- Country: Poland
- Voivodeship: Lower Silesian
- County: Strzelin
- Gmina: Borów
- Elevation: 154 m (505 ft)
- Population: 960

Borek Strzeliński [ˈbɔrɛk stʂɛˈliɲski] is a village in the administrative district of Gmina Borów, within Strzelin County, Lower Silesian Voivodeship, in south-western Poland.

Borek was first mentioned as juxta Borech in an 1155 deed. About 1234 Henry I the Bearded, Duke of Wrocław granted it to the Bishopric of Lebus. When the Bishopric was secularized in 1598, its estates fell to the Margraviate of Brandenburg, including Borek which became an exclave surrounded by the Silesian lands of the Habsburg monarchy. After the Peace of Breslau in 1742 it was incorporated into the Kingdom of Prussia.

After World War II Borek became part of Poland under the terms of the Potsdam Agreement.

== Notable residents ==
- Robert Rößler (1838–1883), German poet
