= Gmina Borów =

Gmina Borów Borów Commune
- Gmina
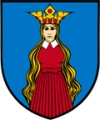
- Coat of arms
- Interactive map of Gmina Borów
- Coordinates (Borów): 50°52′59″N 16°59′25″E
- Country: Poland
- Voivodeship: Lower Silesian
- County: Strzelin
- Seat: Borów
- Sołectwos: Bartoszowa, Boreczek, Borek Strzeliński, Borów, Brzezica, Brzoza, Głownin, Jaksin, Jelenin, Kazimierzów, Kępino, Kojęcin, Kręczków, Kurczów, Ludów Śląski, Mańczyce, Michałowice, Opatowice, Piotrków Borowski, Rochowice, Siemianów, Stogi, Suchowice, Świnobród, Zielenice

Area
  - Total: 98.66 km^{2} (38.09 sq mi)

Population (2019-06-30)
  - Total: 5,294
  - Density: 53.66/km^{2} (139.0/sq mi)
- Website: http://borow.pl/

Gmina Borów is a rural gmina (administrative district) in Strzelin County, Lower Silesian Voivodeship, in south-western Poland. Its seat is the village of Borów, which lies approximately 13 kilometres (8 mi) north-west of Strzelin, and 28 kilometres (17 mi) south of the regional capital Wrocław. It is part of the Wrocław metropolitan area.

The gmina covers an area of 98.66 square kilometres (38.1 sq mi), and as of 2023 its total population is 5,281.

== Neighbouring gminas ==
Gmina Borów is bordered by the gminas of Domaniów, Jordanów Śląski, Kobierzyce, Kondratowice, Strzelin and Żórawina.

== Villages ==
The gmina contains the villages of Bartoszowa, Boguszyce, Boreczek, Borek Strzeliński, Borów, Brzezica, Brzoza, Głownin, Jaksin, Jelenin, Kazimierzów, Kępino, Kojęcin, Kręczków, Kurczów, Ludów Śląski, Mańczyce, Michałowice, Opatowice, Piotrków Borowski, Rochowice, Siemianów, Stogi, Suchowice, Świnobród, Uniszów and Zielenice.

== Twin towns – sister cities ==
Gmina Borów is twinned with:

- Medlov, Czech Republic
