= Paul Guttmann =

German pathologist

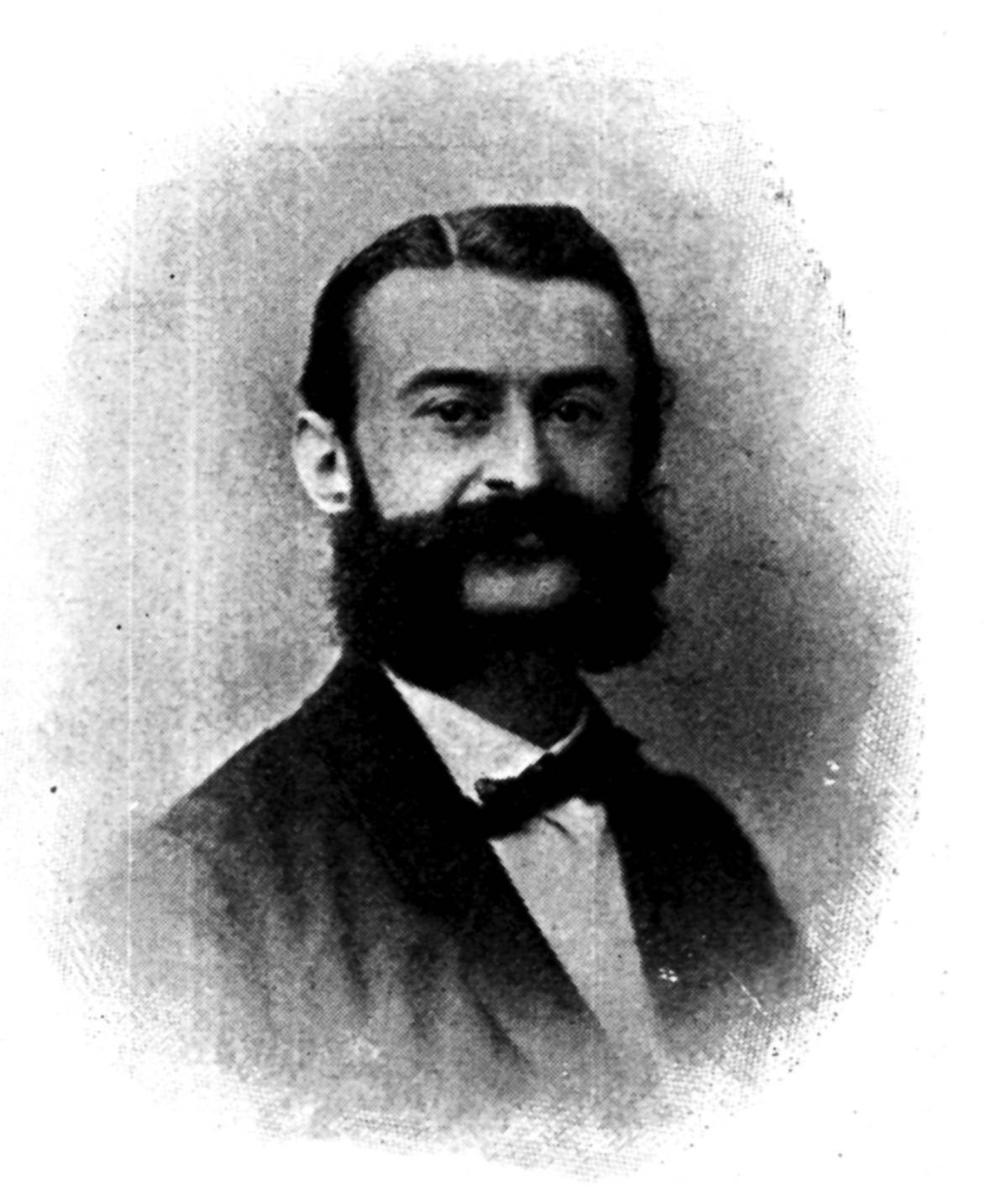
Paul Guttmann (1834-1893)

Paul Guttmann (9 September 1834 in Ratibor (Polish: Racibórz) – 24 May 1893 in Berlin) was a German-Jewish pathologist.

He studied medicine in Berlin, Würzburg and Vienna, earning his doctorate in 1858. From 1859 he worked in Berlin, where he later became an assistant to Wilhelm Griesinger (1817-1868). In 1879 he replaced Heinrich Curschmann (1846-1910) as director of the Moabit Hospital, where one of his students was pediatrician Hugo Neumann (1858-1912). From 1885 to 1893 he was an editor of the Journal für praktische Aerzt.

He is remembered for work with neurologist Albert Eulenburg (1840-1917) involving research of the sympathetic nervous system. With Eulenburg he published Die Pathologie des Sympathicus auf physiologischer Grundlage, a work that was considered at the time to be the best written book on the pathology of the sympathetic system from a physiological basis. As a result of this publication, the two physicians were awarded the 1877 Astley Cooper Prize. However, this honor was later overturned due to a technicality that the book had two authors.

Guttmann also made contributions in his research of tuberculosis and malaria. With Paul Ehrlich (1854-1915), he discovered that the histological stain, methylene blue had effectiveness against malaria.

== Selected works ==
- Die Pathologie des Sympathicus auf physiologischer Grundlage, Albert Eulenburg and Paul Guttmann - Essay on the sympathetic nervous system.
- "A handbook of physical diagnosis: comprising the throat, thorax, and abdomen"; by Paul Guttmann, translated from the third German edition by Alex Napier.
- Die Wirksamkeit to kleiner Tuberkulindosen they gegen Lungenschwindsucht. (with Paul Ehrlich) Deutsche Medizinische Wochenschrift, Berlin, 1890, 16:793-795.
- Ueber die Wirkung des Methylenblau bei Malaria. (with Paul Ehrlich) Berliner klinische Wochenschrift, 1891, 28:953-956.
