= Roeseler =

Roeseler or Röseler is a surname. Notable people with the surname include:

- Larry Roeseler, American motorcycle racer
- Fritz Roeseler (1897–1985), American football player
- Nils Röseler (born 1992), German professional footballer

== See also ==
- Rößler
- Rössler
- Roessler
