= Zielenice, Lower Silesian Voivodeship =

Zielenice
- Village
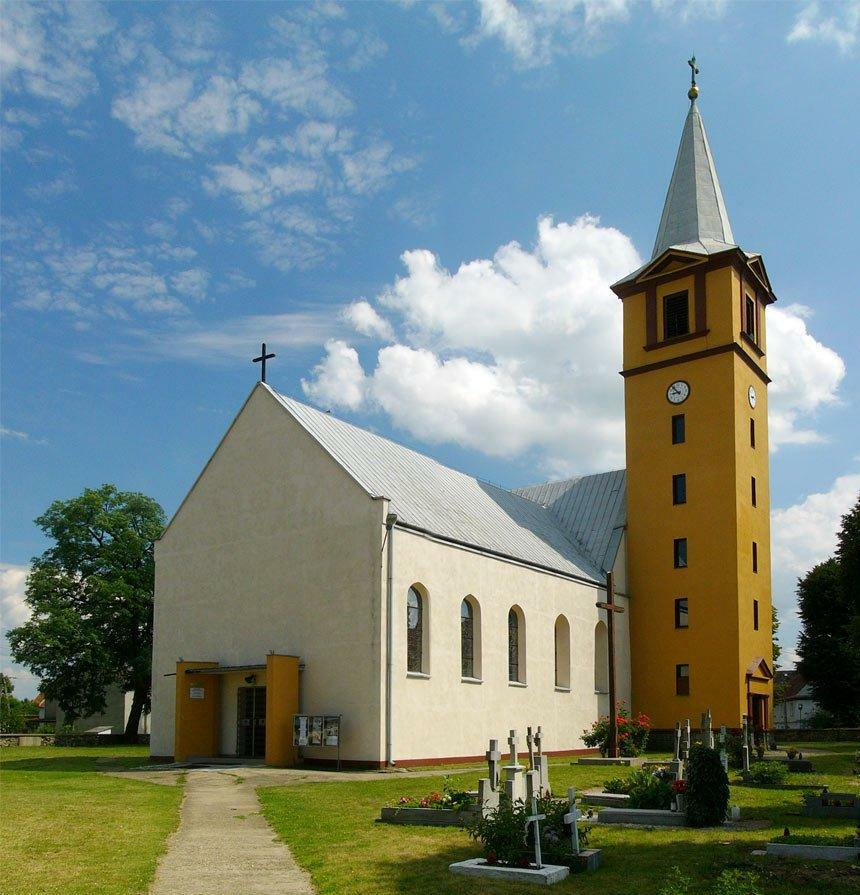
- Catholic church

- Location within Poland
- Coordinates: 50°50′N 16°59′E
- Country: Poland
- Voivodeship: Lower Silesian
- County: Strzelin
- Gmina: Borów

Zielenice [ʑɛlɛˈnit͡sɛ] is a village in the administrative district of Gmina Borów, within Strzelin County, Lower Silesian Voivodeship, in south-western Poland.
