= Siemianów, Lower Silesian Voivodeship =

Siemianów
- Village
- Location within Poland
- Coordinates: 50°50′28″N 16°56′00″E
- Country: Poland
- Voivodeship: Lower Silesian
- County: Strzelin
- Gmina: Borów

Siemianów [ɕɛˈmjanuf] is a village in the administrative district of Gmina Borów, within Strzelin County, Lower Silesian Voivodeship, in south-western Poland.
