= Ludów Śląski =

- Village
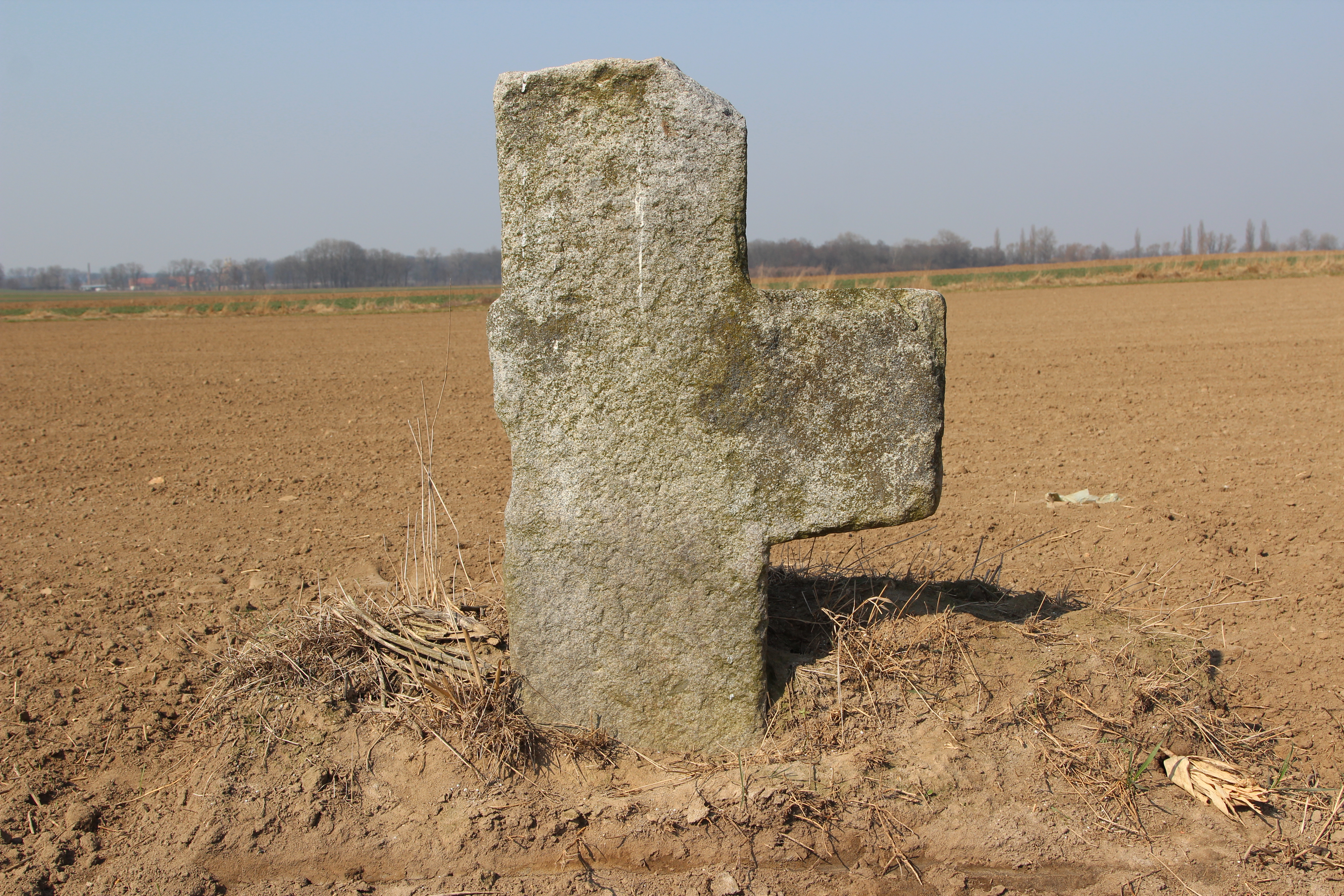
- Stone cross

- Location within Poland
- Coordinates: 50°50′54″N 17°01′29″E
- Country: Poland
- Voivodeship: Lower Silesian
- County: Strzelin
- Gmina: Borów

Ludów Śląski (Polish pronunciation: [ˈluduf ˈɕlɔ̃skʲi]) is a village in the administrative district of Gmina Borów, within Strzelin County, Lower Silesian Voivodeship, in south-western Poland.
