= Ślęża Landscape Park =

Protected area around Mount Ślęża, Poland

Coordinates: 50°52′N 16°42′E

- Ślężański Park Krajobrazowy
- IUCN category V (protected landscape/seascape)
- Interactive map of Ślęża Landscape Park
- Location: Lower Silesian Voivodeship
- Area: 81.90 km^{2} (31.62 sq mi)
- Established: 1988

Ślęża Landscape Park (Ślężański Park Krajobrazowy) is a protected area (Landscape Park) in south-western Poland, established in 1988, covering an area of 81.90 square kilometres (31.62 sq mi). It takes its name from that of Mount Ślęża.

The Park lies within Lower Silesian Voivodeship: in Dzierżoniów County (Gmina Dzierżoniów, Gmina Łagiewniki), Świdnica County (Gmina Marcinowice, Gmina Świdnica) and Wrocław County (Gmina Jordanów Śląski, Gmina Sobótka).

Within the Landscape Park are five nature reserves.
