= Michałowice, Strzelin County =

Michałowice
- Village
- Location within Poland
- Coordinates: 50°53′39″N 17°03′57″E
- Country: Poland
- Voivodeship: Lower Silesian
- County: Strzelin
- Gmina: Borów

Michałowice [mixawɔˈvit͡sɛ] is a village in the administrative district of Gmina Borów, within Strzelin County, Lower Silesian Voivodeship, in south-western Poland.
