= Świnobród, Lower Silesian Voivodeship =

Świnobród
- Village
- Location within Poland
- Coordinates: 50°50′55″N 17°03′33″E
- Country: Poland
- Voivodeship: Lower Silesian
- County: Strzelin
- Gmina: Borów

Świnobród [ɕfiˈnɔbrut] is a village in the administrative district of Gmina Borów, within Strzelin County, Lower Silesian Voivodeship, in south-western Poland.
