= Rosa de Carvalho Alvarenga =

Rosa de Carvalho Alvarenga also known as Dona Rosa de Cacheu and Na Rosa ('Senhora Rosa') (1780s – d. after 1857), was a Euro-African nhara slave trader.

She was the daughter of the Portuguese Manuel de Carvalho Alvarenga from Cape Verde and an African woman and the sister of the governor Francisco de Carvalho Alvarenga. She married the Portuguese official Joao Pereira Barreto (1772–1829) and became the mother of Honorio Pereira Barreto (1813-1859), who was governor from 1830 to 1859. She traded in slaves, cotton, rice and beeswax and played an important role as the business channel between the Portuguese and the indigenous African population. She also acted as a political diplomat and mediator between the Portuguese and the indigenous African population, particularly during the warfare of the 1840s. At one point in the 1850s, she achieved a near monopoly of the slave trade of the region.
