= Mańczyce =

- Village
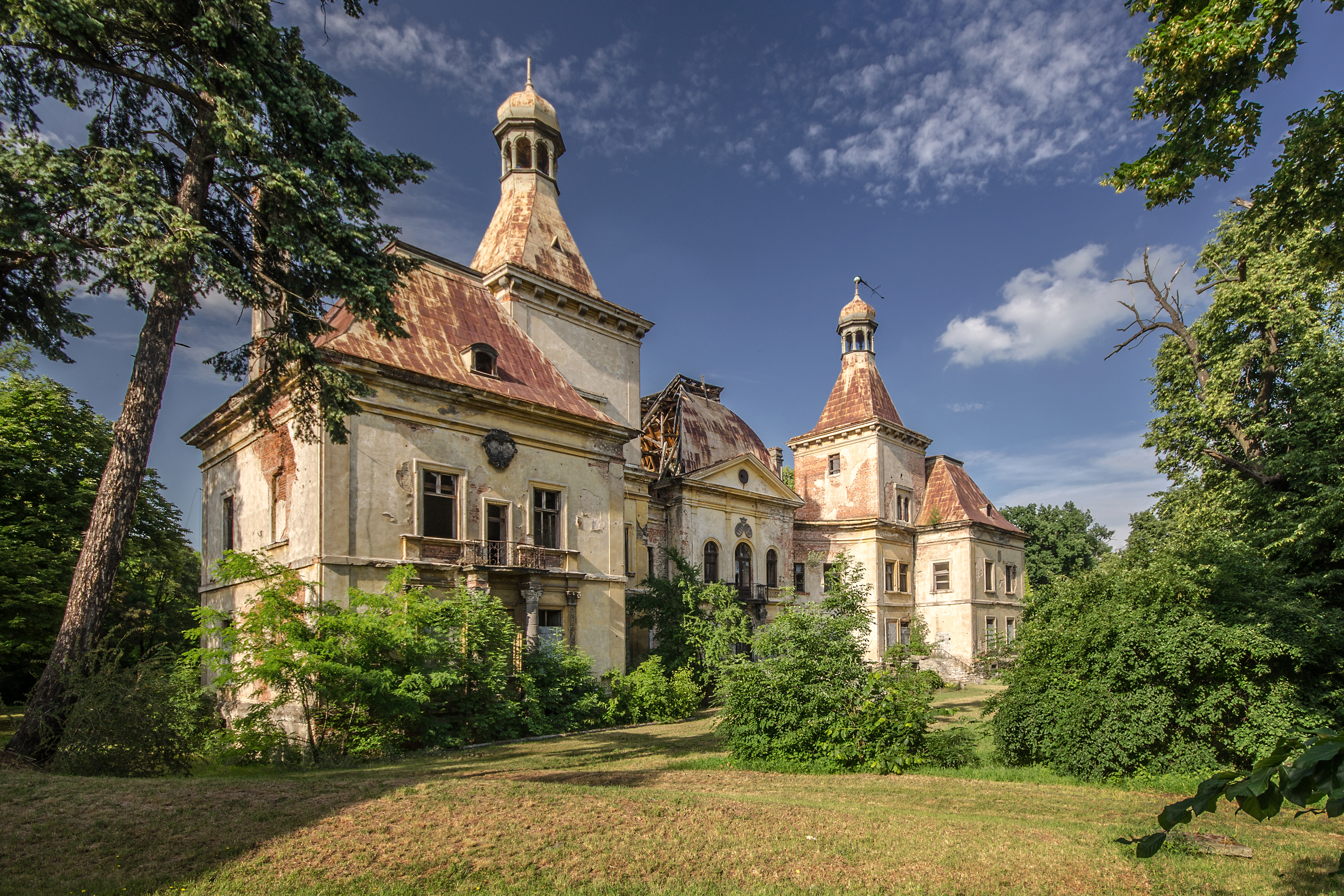
- Palace in Mańczyce

- Location within Poland
- Coordinates: 50°51′34″N 16°58′24″E
- Country: Poland
- Voivodeship: Lower Silesian
- County: Strzelin
- Gmina: Borów

Mańczyce [maɲˈt͡ʂɨt͡sɛ] is a village in the administrative district of Gmina Borów, within Strzelin County, Lower Silesian Voivodeship, in south-western Poland.
