= Robert Rößler =

German poet

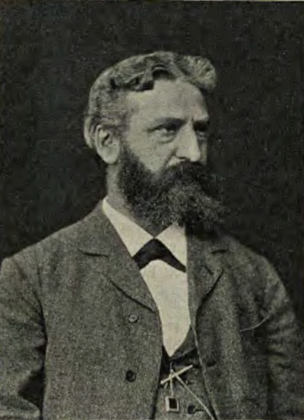
- Born: 1 March 1838; Großburg, Silesia, Kingdom of Prussia
- Died: 20 May 1883 (aged 45); Ratibor, Silesia, Kingdom of Prussia, German Empire
- Occupation: Poet

Signature
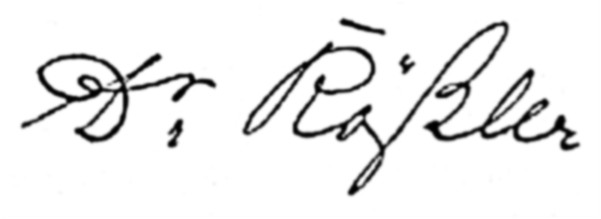

Robert Rößler (1 March 1838 – 20 May 1883) was a German poet.

Rößler was born in Großburg, Lower Silesia, Prussia and died in Ratibor, where he had worked as a teacher.

== Publications ==
- Der Tag von Lundby (1865)
- Aus Krieg und Frieden (1867)
- Aus der Güntherstadt (1873, Co-author)
- Dore (1876)
- Närr’sche Kerle (1878)
- Schläs’sche Durfgeschichten (1879)
- Durf- und Stoadtleute (1880)
- Wie der Schnoabel gewaxen (1881)
- Gemittliche Geschichten (1882)
- Mein erster Patient, Berlin (1883)
