= Rosa Monfasani =

Argentinean librarian (born 1944)

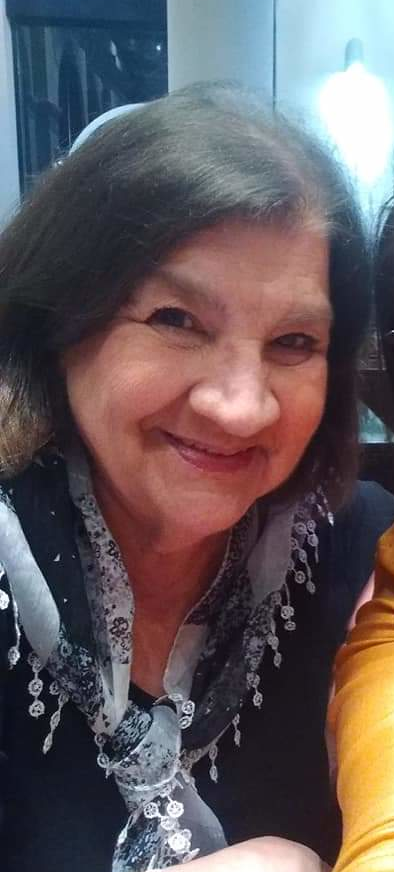
- Born: May 6, 1944 (age 82)
- Education: University of Buenos Aires
- Occupation: Librarian

Rosa Emma Monfasani (born May 6, 1944) is an Argentine librarian and teacher who has influenced generations of librarians through her pedagogical activity and publications.

== Career ==
She obtained the title of Librarian and Professor in Information Science from the Faculty of Philosophy and Letters of the University of Buenos Aires.

Monfasani has worked as a teacher on topics related to the organization and management of information units, particularly in libraries. She was part of the organizing committee that held the first congress of the International Federation of Library Associations and Libraries - IFLA in South America in August 2004. She has been working on making the impact of libraries visible in the United Nations Sustainable Development Goals, as in her writing on art libraries in the 2030 Agenda.

She was coordinator of the RENABIAR National Network of Librarian Associations from its creation in 2011 to 2018. During her tenure, she promoted the Professional Registry of Argentine Librarians. Member of the Coordinating Committee of Reciaria Network of information networks

== Featured posts ==
Among her featured publications are:

- Introduction to Library Science. Alfagrama Ediciones. This book in particular is widely used by those who are trained in librarianship and can even be found in public libraries in Barcelona, which accounts for its influence on Ibero-American documentation.
- Librarians, users and knowledge management. Alfagrama Ediciones.
- Library skills and work environment. Alfagrama Ediciones.
- Introduction to library administration and management. Alfagrama Ediciones.
- Psychology Thesaurus.
- If Gutemberg lived ...: where and how to access information.
- Information Users: training and challenges.
- Chronicles in times of pandemic. Alfagrama Ediciones.

== Awards and distinctions ==
She has obtained the following awards:

- For her outstanding work as president of ABGRA, she received an award from the Association of Graduate Librarians of the Argentine Republic and the Library of Congress of the Nation, in 2015.
- Honorary Member of the Jujuy Library Association (ABJ) in Recognition of selfless and permanent advice in 2019.
- Recognition of trajectory, unconditional and permanent support to legal librarians granted by the JuriRed Libraries Organizing Commission in 2019.
