= Rosa Koian =

Rosa Koian is a human rights and environmental activist from Papua New Guinea.

== Life ==
Koian is a leading member of the Bismarck Ramu Group, a non-governmental organisation based in Madang Province, Papua New Guinea. The group represents indigenous communities on development and conservation issues. The group leads legal challenges against the advances of international corporations, particularly in resource extraction industries and palm oil production.

Koian also works with sufferers of leprosy to assist them in leading active lives and advocates for their needs.

Koian worked with the Oakland Institute on the film On Our Land, which was released in 2013 and described the rapid and massive appropriation of Papua New Guinean land by foreign-owned corporations.

Koian is editor of Wantok Niuspepa, the only Tok Pisin language newspaper in Papua New Guinea.

=== Publications ===
- 'Social and economic impact of climate change in Papua New Guinea'. Catalyst, Vol. 42, No. 1, 2012: 69-83.
