= Rosa Maria Rössler =

Austrian-born medical doctor, translator (1901–1954)

- Born: 14 December 1901; Vienna
- Died: 1954 (aged 52–53); Istanbul
- Education: University of Graz; University of Vienna; University of Innsbruck
- Occupations: Medical doctor, translator
- Known for: Translations of medical textbooks

Rosa Maria Rössler (14 December 1901 in Vienna – 1954 in Istanbul), was a medical doctor of Austrian origin who fled her home country to take up medicine in Turkey. She became a translator of medical texts into the Turkish language.

== Early life ==
She was the daughter of Jozef and Maria Wimmer. Rosa Maria Rössler completed her high school education in Gmunden in 1920. She attended the University of Graz and then the Medical Faculty of the University of Vienna. She continued her medical education at the University of Innsbruck for her specialization. On July 20, 1927, the entire educational process was completed at the University of Vienna. In 1935, as a result of the purges of the Nazi regime, she was forced to leave Austria.

== Turkey years ==
Rössler came to Turkey for the first time in 1934, and was able to earn permanent residence in 1937. She started working at Istanbul University Faculty of Medicine. She was engaged in studies in the field of pathological anatomy. Rössler started working here in 1933 with Philipp Schwartz, who was forced to leave his position at the University of Frankfurt and was involved in negotiations with the Turkish government within the framework of the university reform. Schwartz played a leading role in bringing many exiled scientists and technocrats to Turkey at that time. Rössler worked at the Istanbul University Faculty of Medicine Institute of Pathological Anatomy for ten years and was a very valuable and important employee for Schwartz, who was the director of the institute. Schwartz had set himself the goal of conducting as many and varied autopsies as possible at his institute. About 1000 autopsies were performed annually. In the annual report submitted by Schwartz, who was the president of the institute, to the Dean of the faculty of medicine, mentions the following about Rössler's position at the institute in the period 1937–1938:

My foreign employees regularly participate in autopsy studies. In particular, Dr. Rössler has learned Turkish perfectly and is leading the autopsy courses conducted. As my colleague, she is fully competent in this task.

One of the reasons that made Turkey's 1933 university reform necessary was that students did not have up-to-date textbooks. In their contracts with foreign scientists, it is stated that in order to continue working at the university, they must publish a textbook on their subject in Turkish within five years. Rössler devoted herself to this goal and turned to cooperation with her colleagues. She made a Turkish translation of Schwartz's books one by one, and in 1943 these books were published.

Rössler was so meticulous in translating medical texts from German into Turkish that she collaborated with physicians from other medical fields in this respect as well. Prof. Dr. Erich Frank was one of those who asked her for help. Frank was a name that gained worldwide attention as the first person to develop oral medication for diabetes. The book "Pathology of Carbohydrate Metabolism" was to be published in German in Switzerland in 1949. Dr. Rössler also worked on the design of this book and in the same year she also ensured that the book was published in Turkish. Hüsrev Hatemi, an endocrinologist known academically in Turkey, conveys the importance of this book as follows:

This study considers the physiopathology of diabetes from a very rational point of view. Even if it has been more than 50 years since its first publication, it still retains its value.

In July 1947, due to the intensification of cooperation between Frank and Rössler, their joint work, which was several days a week with the permission of the Decanery, became fully operational. Rössler was now a full-time employee at the Internal Medicine Clinic.

In 1951, Rössler published a book in Turkish by her former chief Scwartz, this time about his main branch of pathology; "General and Special Histopathology".

In Turkey, which was on the verge of war, Rösler remained an Austrian at that time, and she had to work with a German passport. In 1940 and 1944, Rössler applied for Turkish citizenship, but her efforts were inconclusive. Rössler worked at rather low salaries at that time. To get a raise, Schwartz wrote a letter to the deanery describing her as “...

Dr. Rossler deserves a small salary increase because of her skills, hard work and talent and respectability.

The faculty complied with this request. During this period, Rössler continued to send help to her older sister Rosa Miller and sister Inge Fuchs in Salzburg, even while she received little salary.

== Recent years ==
On April 4, 1951, Rössler was finally granted Turkish citizenship.

Apart from the information in the university archives, there is little detailed data on Rössler's life. It seems that she was 33 years old when she came to Turkey and that she was divorced. She spent 11 years in Turkey, including the war years. There are contributions made by Turkish medicine during the modernization period with its selfless work. However, besides the great scientists of the period, it is also a fact that her name remains relatively unknown. It is noteworthy that while it is possible for her to continue her working life as a scientist in Turkey, where she started as an assistant, she turned to medical translations and took the lead in this field.

She died at a young age in 1954 due to an illness, having lived alone for 20 years.
