= Michalovice (Litoměřice District) =

- Municipality
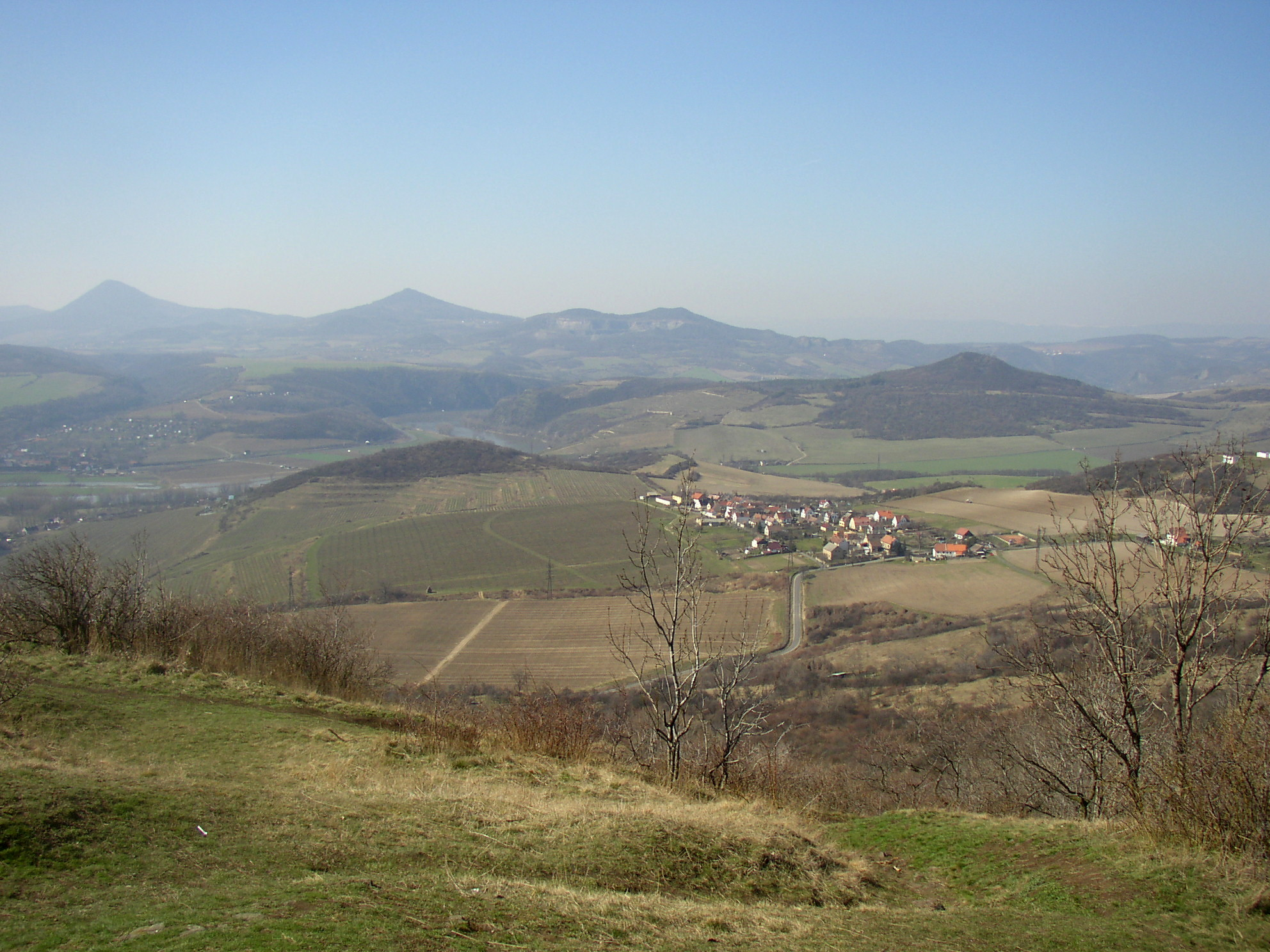
- View from the southeast

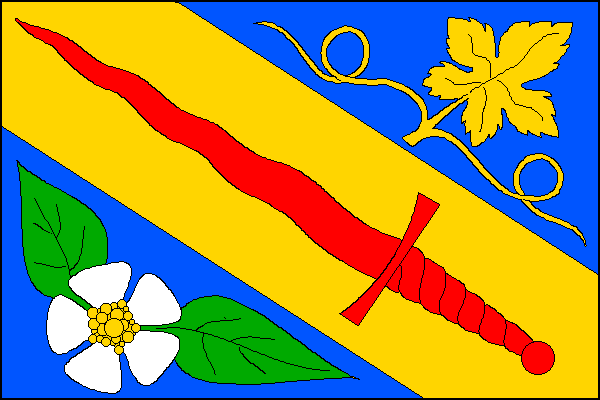
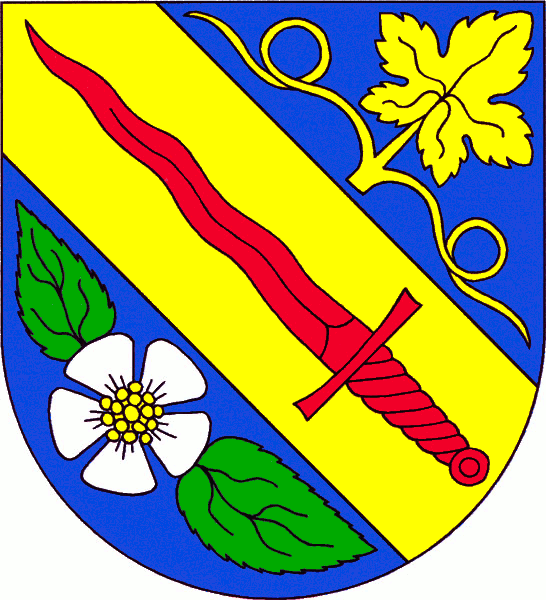
- Flag Coat of arms

- Location in the Czech Republic
- Coordinates: 50°32′12″N 14°4′55″E
- Country: Czech Republic
- Region: Ústí nad Labem
- District: Litoměřice
- First mentioned: 1720

Area
  - Total: 0.83 km^{2} (0.32 sq mi)
- Elevation: 245 m (804 ft)

Population (2026-01-01)
  - Total: 177
  - Density: 210/km^{2} (550/sq mi)
- Time zone: UTC+1 (CET)
  - Summer (DST): UTC+2 (CEST)
- Postal code: 412 01
- Website: michalovice.com

Michalovice is a municipality and village in Litoměřice District in the Ústí nad Labem Region of the Czech Republic. It has about 200 inhabitants.

Michalovice lies approximately 3 kilometres (2 mi) west of Litoměřice, 14 km (9 mi) south of Ústí nad Labem, and 56 km (35 mi) north-west of Prague.

== Demographics ==
Historical population
Year	Pop.	±%
1869	315	—
1880	285	−9.5%
1890	265	−7.0%
1900	272	+2.6%
1910	268	−1.5%
1921	243	−9.3%
1930	313	+28.8%
1950	184	−41.2%
1961	203	+10.3%
1970	155	−23.6%
1980	124	−20.0%
1991	122	−1.6%
2001	143	+17.2%
2011	133	−7.0%
2021	153	+15.0%
Source: Censuses
