= Bartoszowa =

- Village
- Location within Poland
- Coordinates: 50°53′N 16°59′E
- Country: Poland
- Voivodeship: Lower Silesian
- County: Strzelin
- Gmina: Borów

Bartoszowa [bartɔˈʂɔva] is a village in the administrative district of Gmina Borów, within Strzelin County, Lower Silesian Voivodeship, in south-western Poland.

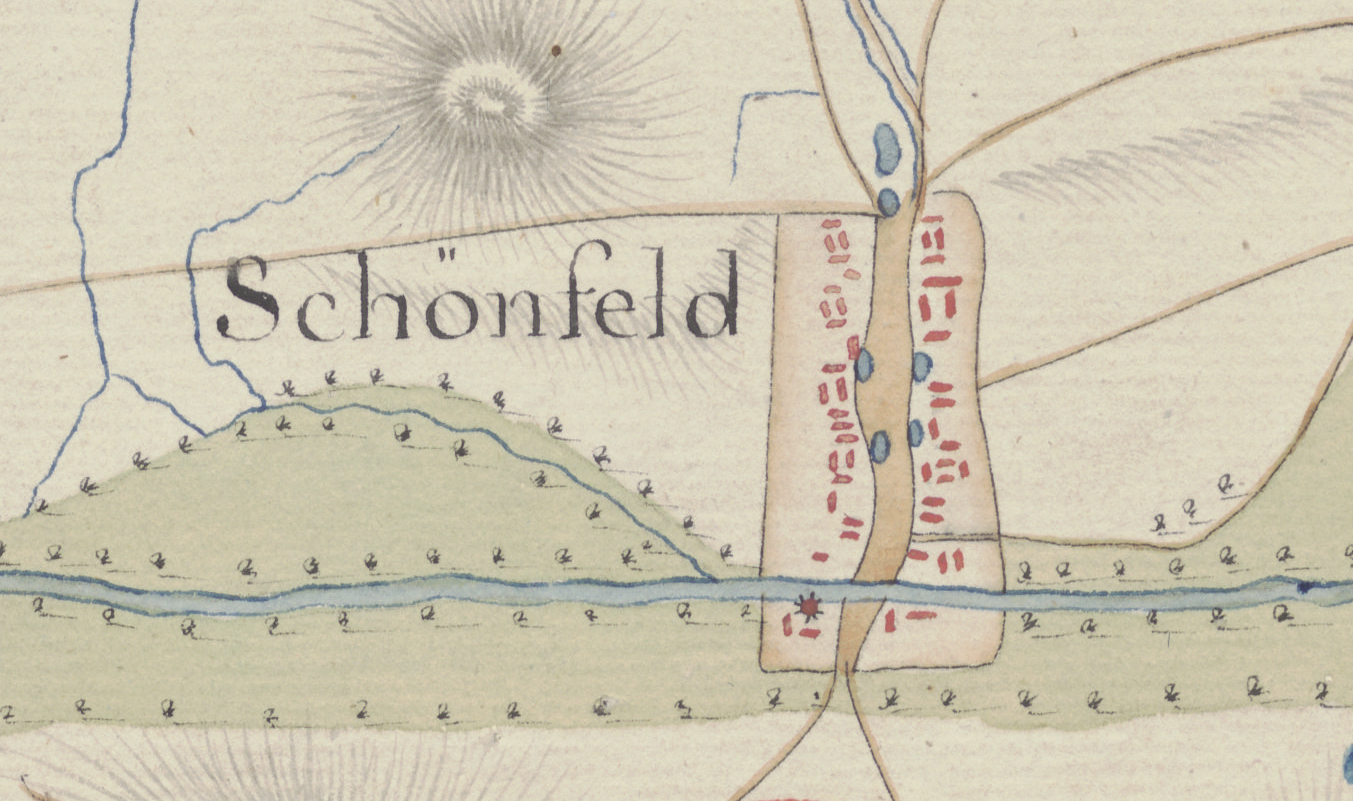
Map of Bartoszowa (then Schönfeld), (c. 1820)
