= Rosa Simonovich =

Ukrainian medical graduate (born 1850)

Rosa Simonovich (20 June 1850 - ?) was the first Ukrainian woman to earn a medical degree from University of Bern. Born in Odessa, Ukraine, Simonovich studied at Zurich University and researched emetics and joints. Her research was cut short when Russian women students were ejected from Zurich on the orders of the tsar; she moved to Bern in 1873 and researched ophthalmology with Heinrich Dor. Her research at Bern concerned hyoscyamine as an alternative to atropine for use in ophthalmic surgery. Simonovich graduated in 1874 and disappeared from the historical record.
