= Opatowice, Lower Silesian Voivodeship =

Opatowice
- Village
- Location within Poland
- Coordinates: 50°52′N 17°2′E
- Country: Poland
- Voivodeship: Lower Silesian
- County: Strzelin
- Gmina: Borów

Opatowice [ɔpatɔˈvit͡sɛ] is a village in the administrative district of Gmina Borów, within Strzelin County, Lower Silesian Voivodeship, in south-western Poland.
