= Slesa =

- სლესა
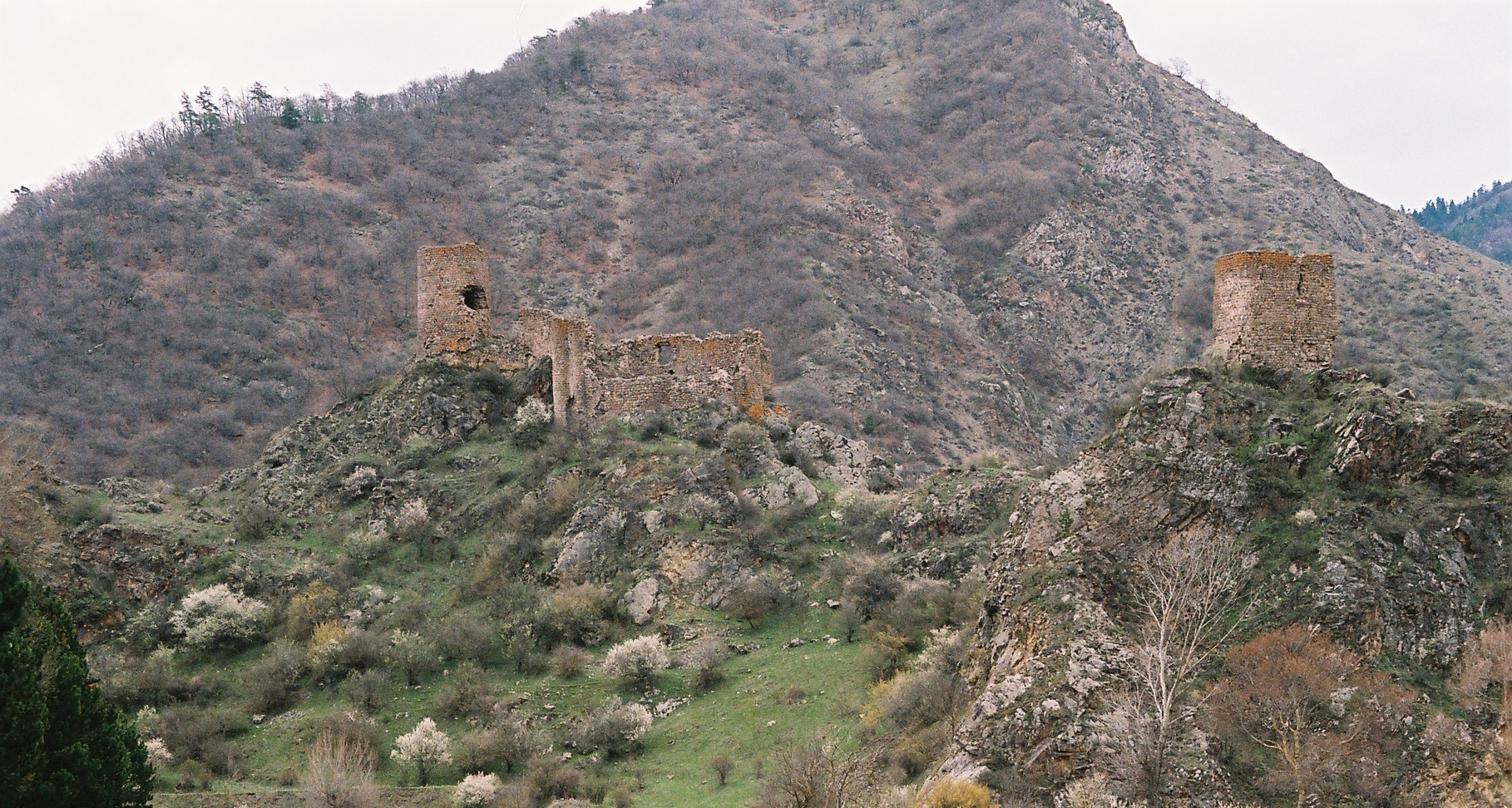
- Ruins of Slesa
- Interactive map of Slesa
- Location: Akhaltsikhe Municipality, Samtskhe-Javakheti, Georgia
- Coordinates: 41.747500°N 43.206502°E
- Type: Fortress

The Slesa fortress (Georgian: სლესის ციხე, romanized: slesis tsikhe) is a medieval fortress in Georgia, located in the Akhaltsikhe Municipality in the Samtskhe–Javakheti region. The fortress—its history involved in obscurity—consists of a castle, now in a ruinous state, and a better preserved tower, strategically perched on two adjoining hills, guarding the southern approaches to the heartland of Georgia through the Borjomi valley. The fortress is inscribed on the list of the Immovable Cultural Monuments of National Significance.

== History ==
The castle's history is unknown. Architectural features, including the lack of embrasures for firearms, suggests that Slesa might have been built in the High Middle Ages. A Georgian document dated to 1516—listing the noble families of Samtskhe—mentions the Slesari, literally, "of Slesa", who shared with the Avalishvili the heritage of the Bumbulidze, "with their cemetery, monastery, and court church". The village of Slesa is first documented, as consisting of 16 households, in an Ottoman fiscal census dated to 1598. The Ottoman conquest of the area resulted in displacement or assimilation of the local population of Samtskhe. By the 19th century, the village had gone extinct.

== Layout ==
The Slesa fortress tops a rocky hill, roughly midway between the villages of Kvabiskhevi and Atsquri, on the left bank of the Kura (Mtkvari), near the main S8 Borjomi-Akhaltsikhe road. It commands a strategic perch, overlooking the river valley and guarding the southern entrance to the Borjomi defile.

The castle is heavily damaged: the upper walls are collapsed, the apertures of windows and doorways are wrecked, and its inner structures lie in ruins. The building is set in an irregular rectangular plan, elongated on the south–north axis and rounded at its southwest end. The curtain walls—of varying height and carried up to eight metres on the south—are fortified with somewhat projecting semicircular buttresses. The courtyard consists of three platforms: the lower one contains remnants of various small structures, the middle one houses a ruined hall church of small dimensions, and the upper one is topped by a tall tower with rounded corners, which is almost entirely enveloped by the curtain wall.

The castle walls are built of regular courses of stonework, bound together with mortar. The thickness of the walls is approximately 150 cm. South of the lower platform is a four-storey separate tower, with a semicircular rear wall, which is built of horizontal courses of rubble. A ravine slope between the castle and the tower is flanked, on the east, with a defensive wall, up to 130 metres thick. As of 2019, the territory of the fortress has never been archaeologically studied.
