= Jelenin, Lower Silesian Voivodeship =

Jelenin
- Village
- Location within Poland
- Coordinates: 50°51′37″N 17°02′40″E
- Country: Poland
- Voivodeship: Lower Silesian
- County: Strzelin
- Gmina: Borów
- Time zone: UTC+1 (CET)
  - Summer (DST): UTC+2 (CEST)
- Vehicle registration: DST

Jelenin [jɛˈlɛnin] is a village in the administrative district of Gmina Borów, within Strzelin County, Lower Silesian Voivodeship, in south-western Poland.

The name of the village is of Polish origin and comes from the word jeleń, which means "deer".
