= Rosa Warrens =

Swedish poet and translator

- Born: 24 February 1821; Karlskrona, Sweden
- Died: 8 November 1878 (aged 57); Copenhagen, Denmark
- Occupations: Poet, translator
- Writing career
- Language: German

Rosa Warrens (24 February 1821 – 8 November 1878) was a Swedish-born poet and translator.

== Biography ==
Rosa Warrens was born into a Jewish family in Karlskrona in 1821. At the age of five, she went with her parents to Hamburg, where she remained until her father's death in 1861. She then moved to Berlin with her mother, with whom she lived in quiet seclusion. After the latter's death in the summer of 1878, she settled in Copenhagen. She died from a heart attack soon after her arrival.

Despite having never attended a public school or received regular instruction, Warrens devoted herself to Swedish literature and Norse mythology, translating into German the northern folk-songs in the original metres. A volume of her original poems appeared in 1873.

== Publications ==
- Swedische Volkslieder der Vorzeit. Warrens, Rosa. Germanische Volkslieder der Vorzeit, v. 1. Leipzig: F. A. Brockhaus. 1857. hdl:2027/bc.ark:/13960/t9t19mh90.
- Germanische Volkslieder der Vorzeit. Vol. 1–4. Leipzig: F. A. Brockhaus. 1857–66.
- Dänische Volkslieder der Vorzeit. Hamburg: Hoffmann und Campe. 1858.
- Schottische Volkslieder der Vorzeit. Germanische volkslieder der vorzeit, III. Hamburg: Hoffman und Campe. 1861. hdl:2027/hvd.32044089060586.
- Zwei Lieder der Edden. Hamburg: Hoffman und Campe. 1863.
- Norwegische, Isländische, Färöische Volkslieder der Vorzeit. Germanische volkslieder der vorzeit ... Bd. IV. Hamburg: Hoffmann und Campe. 1866. hdl:2027/hvd.32044089067714.
- Finnische Volkslieder der Vorzeit. 1868.
- Gedichte. Berlin: Mitscher & Röstell. 1873.
