= Wilhelm Weintraud =

Wilhelm Weintraud (13 August 1866 – 1920) was a German internist born in Offenbach am Main.

In 1889 he obtained his medical doctorate form the University of Strasbourg, where he spent the next few years as an assistant to Friedrich Daniel von Recklinghausen (1833–1910). In 1893 he received his habilitation in internal medicine, and from 1894 to 1896 served as a senior physician at the Berlin-Charité. Afterwards he worked in the medical clinic at the University of Breslau, and in 1898 was appointed director of internal medicine at the municipal hospital in Wiesbaden.

Weintraud made significant contributions in the field of diabetology. He is remembered for his research involving the formation of uric acid, and his investigations of acetonuria. Among his better known written works are the following:

- Untersuchungen über den Stoffwechsel im Diabetes Mellitus und zur diaetetischen Therapie der Krankheit, 1893 - Studies on metabolism in diabetes mellitus and for dietary treatment of disease.
- Über den Pankreas-Diabetes der Vögel – in: Naunyn-Schmiedenberg's archives of pharmacology, ISSN 1432-1912, Vol. 34 (3/4. 1894), p. 303-312. - On pancreatic diabetes in birds.
