= Ślęza =

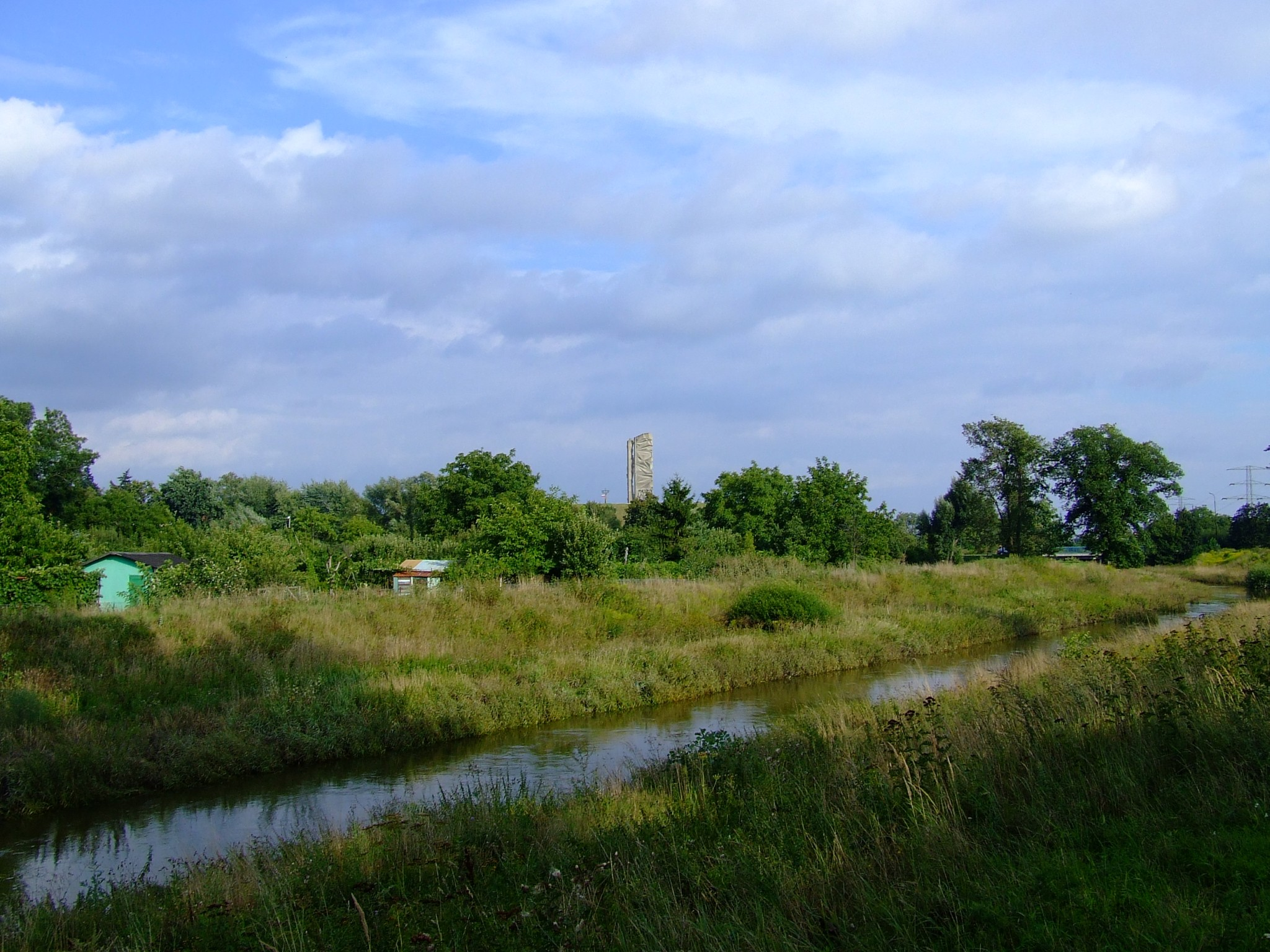

Location
- Country: Poland

Physical characteristics
- Mouth
  - location: Oder
  - coordinates: 51.1593°N 16.9505°E

Basin features
- Progression: Oder→ Baltic Sea

The Ślęza (Polish: [ˈɕlɛ̃za]; German: Lohe) is a 84.1-kilometre (52.3 mi) river in Lower Silesia, southern Poland, a left tributary of the Oder. It starts in the Niemcza Hills (Polish: Wzgórza Niemczańskie), part of the Sudeten Foreland (Przedgórze Sudeckie), and flows near Mount Ślęża through the Silesian Lowland (Nizina Śląska) and enters the Oder in Wrocław.

The most important tributary is the Mała Ślęza ("Small Ślęza"). The most important towns on the river are: Niemcza, Tyniec nad Ślęzą, Jordanów Śląski and Wrocław.

The name is probably derived from a Silesian word meaning "wet swampy place". In a papal bull from Hadrian IV in 1155, the river is called the Selenza.

The names of the Ślęza and Mount Ślęża are both of Silesian origin, but the Ślęza is spelled with a standard z and Mount Ślęża is spelled with a ż, pronounced like an English zh.

== See also ==
- Mała Ślęza
