= Ślęża =

Mountain in Poland

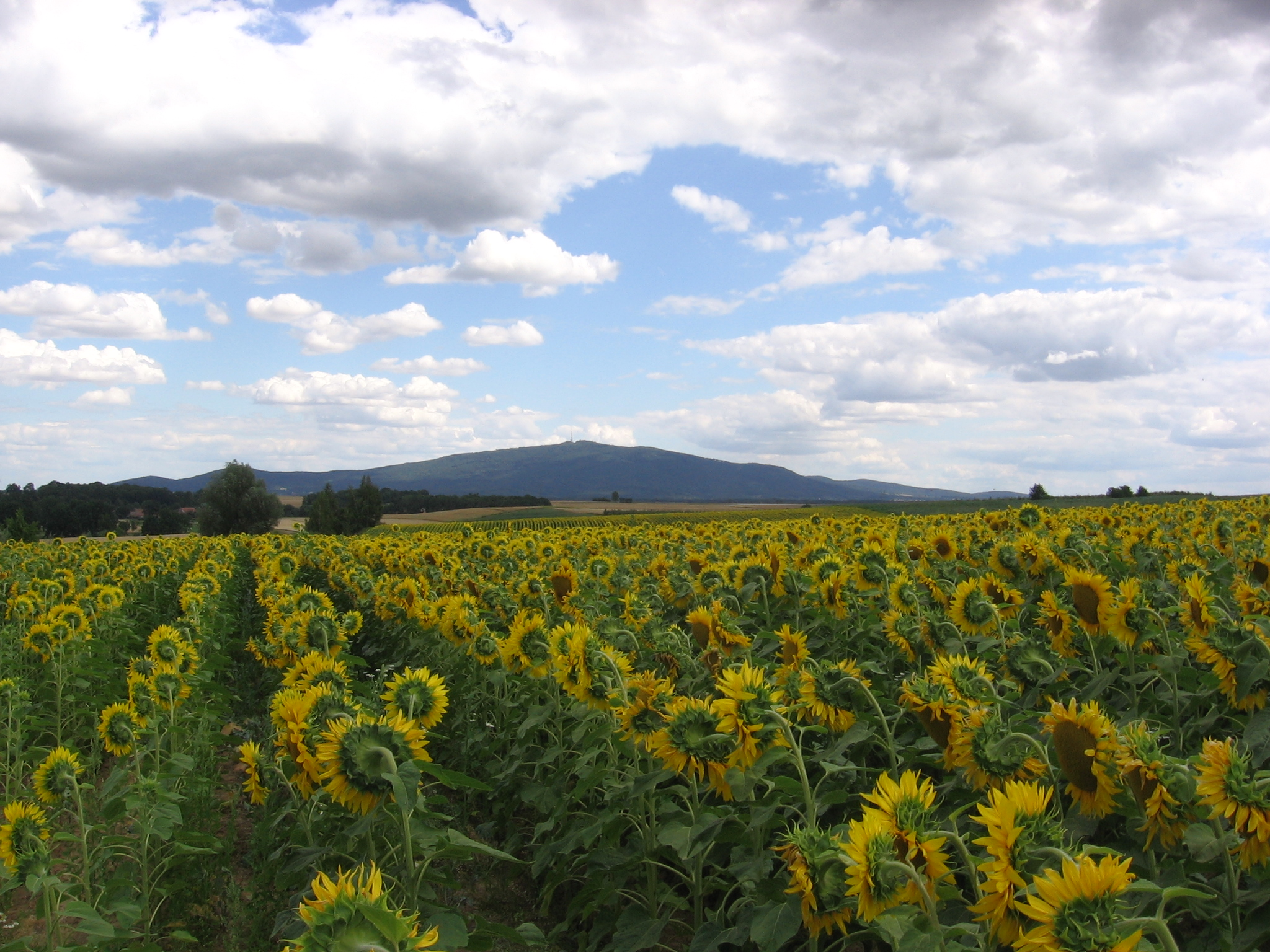
- View from the northwest

Highest point
- Elevation: 718 m (2,356 ft)
- Prominence: 468 m (1,535 ft)
- Coordinates: 50°51′54.061″N 16°42′31.741″E

Geography
- Location within Lower Silesian Voivodeship
- Location: Lower Silesian Voivodeship, Poland
- Parent range: Ślęża Massif
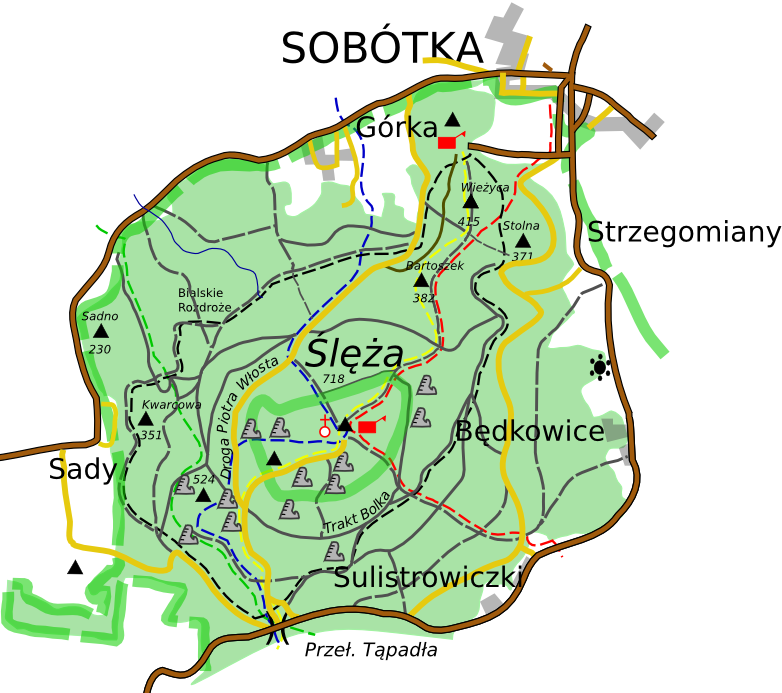
- Topo map

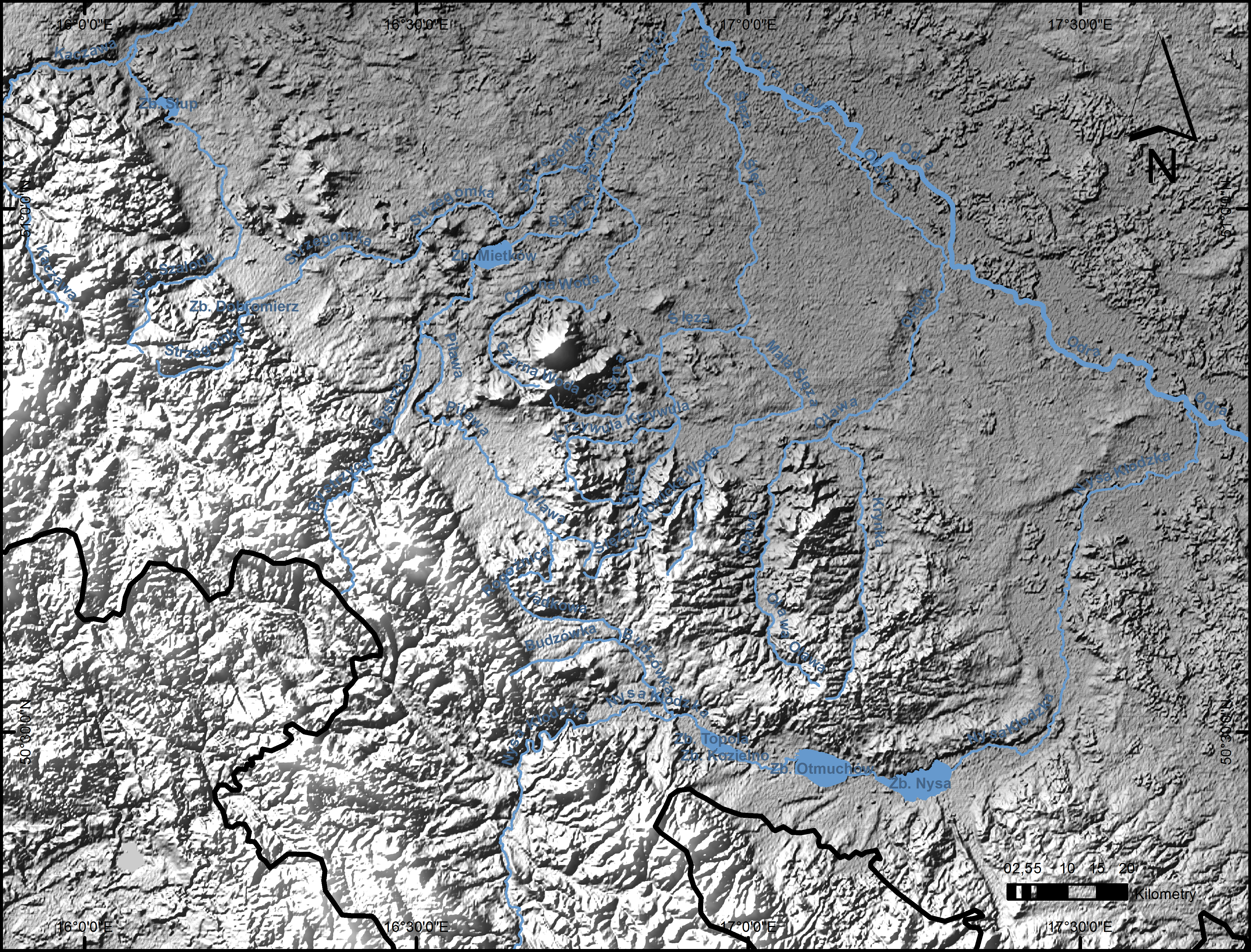
The isolated location of the mountain

The Ślęża (Polish: [ˈɕlɛ̃ʐa]; German: Zobten) is a 718 m (2,356 ft) high mountain in the Sudeten Foreland in Poland. The mountain is built mostly of granite and is covered with forests.

The top of the mountain has a PTTK tourist mountain hut, a television and radio mast, the Church of the Visitation of the Blessed Virgin Mary, some poorly visible ruins of the castle and an observation tower. The area of the peak is protected as the Góra Ślęża nature reserve. The wide area around the mountain forms the Ślęża Landscape Park protected area.

== Location ==
Ślęża is located in the territory of Sobótka in Lower Silesian Voivodeship in southern Poland, about 30 km (19 mi) southeast of Wrocław. Geomorphologically it is situated in the Ślęża Massif mesoregion of the Sudeten Foreland macroregion.

== Sacred mountain ==
During the Neolithic Period and at least as far back as the 7th century BC Mount Ślęża was a holy place of the Pagan tribes of the Lusatian culture. The Silingi, a subpopulation of the East Germanic tribe known as the Vandals are the earliest inhabitants of Silesia known by their name, however the greater part of them moved westwards after the 5th century AD and the remainder were slowly replaced in the 6th century by Slavic tribes who assimilated the few remaining East Germanic inhabitants. The name of the territory Silesia either derives from the Ślęza River, or from Mount Ślęża, which themselves derive their name from either, according to Germanist authors the Silingi people. or, according to Slavisist authors, the Ślężanie people.

The Slavic Ślężanie tribe settled in the area around the 6th century AD. In the 10th century, Mieszko I incorporated Silesia into the Polish state. The etymology of the mountain is highly disputed between a Slavic, Germanic, or other Indo-European origin. The name has been recorded in several forms, as monte Silencii, in 1108, or as monte Slez in 1245.

Mount Ślęża was an ancient holy place for local Lusatian tribes dedicated to a sun deity, and remained a holy place during Christian times. In the first half of the 12th century, the owner of the place was the Polish dukes' governor, Piotr Włostowic, who founded there an Augustinian convent which was subsequently moved to Wrocław in 1153.

== Transmitter ==
On Ślęża there is a facility for FM and TV transmission, which uses a 136 m-tall (446 ft) free-standing (with additional guying) lattice tower. The current tower which was built in 1972 replaced a 98 m-tall (322 ft) tower built in 1957, which was partially guyed.

== Gallery ==
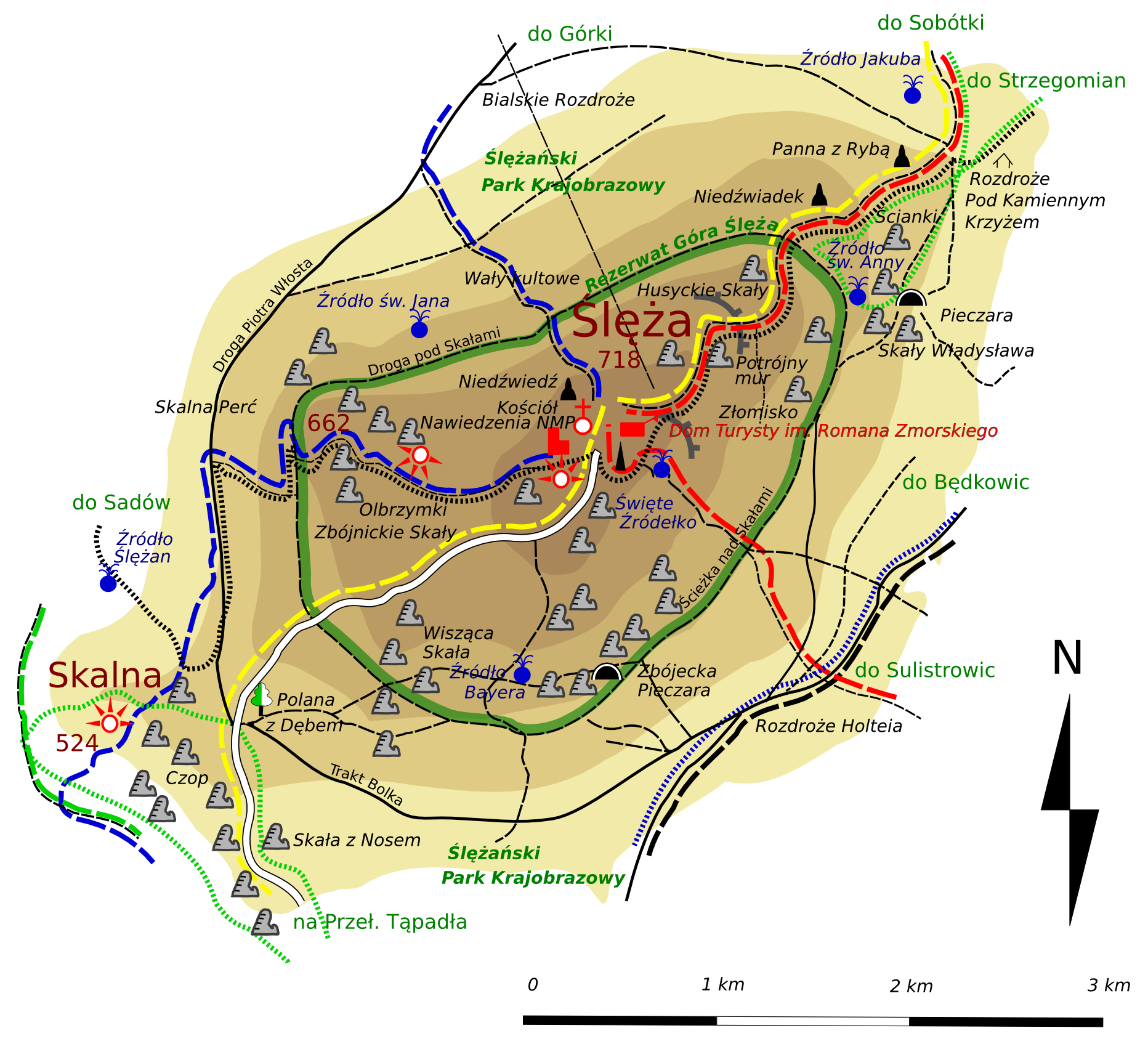
Map of the peak

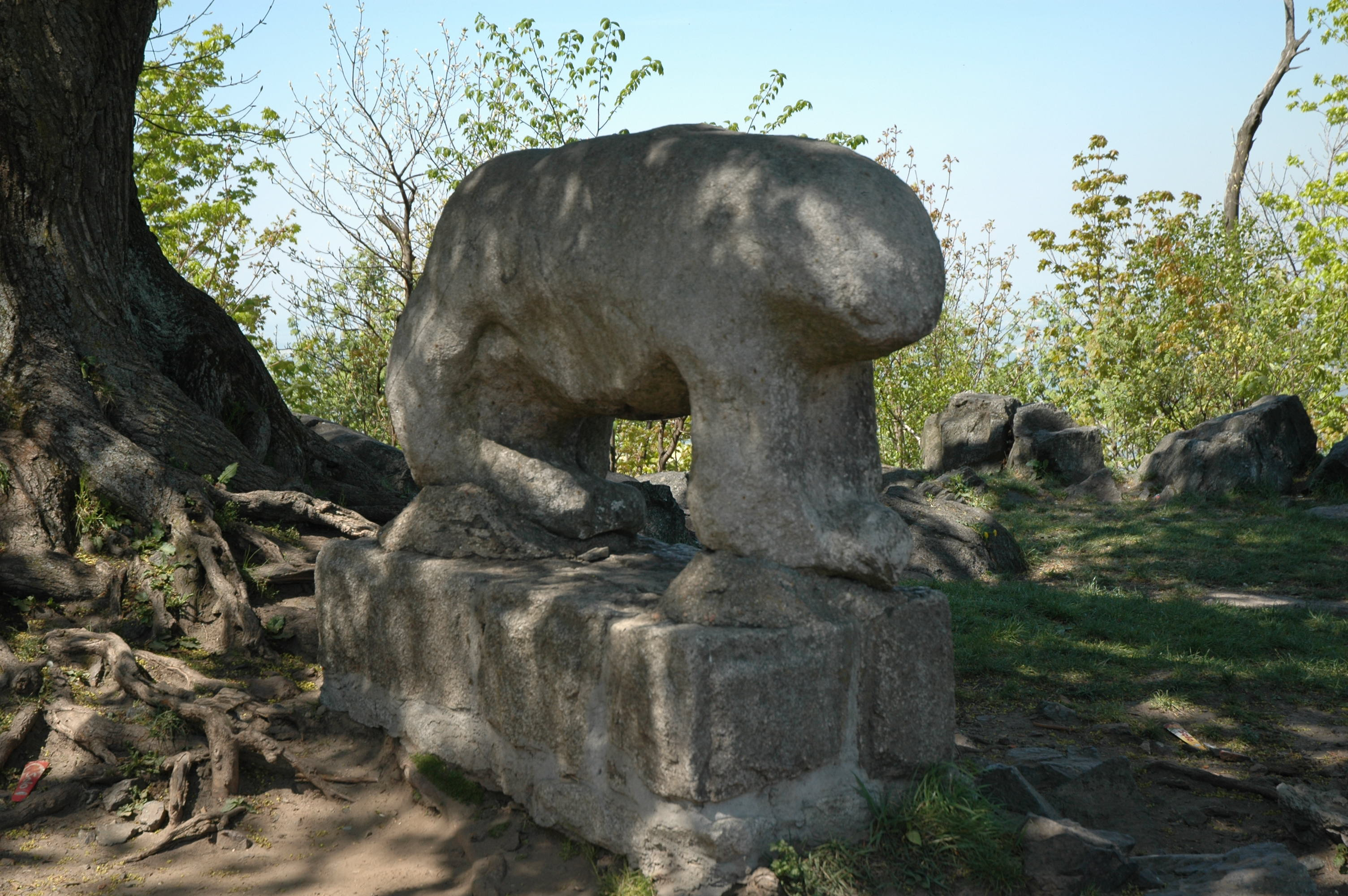
Ancient (probably Celtic) cult sculpture of a bear at the top of Slęża

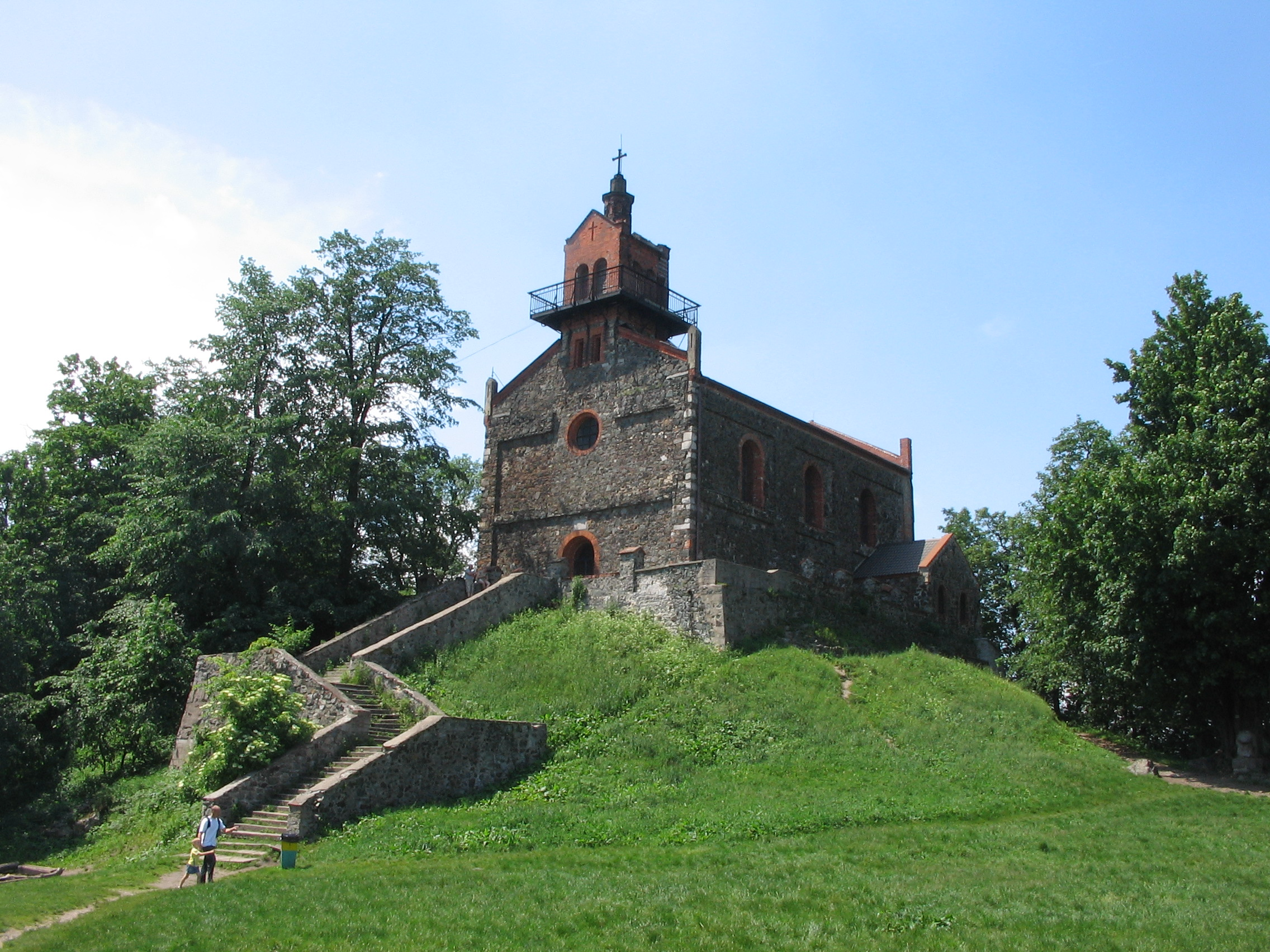
Church of the Visitation of the Blessed Virgin Mary at the top of Ślęża

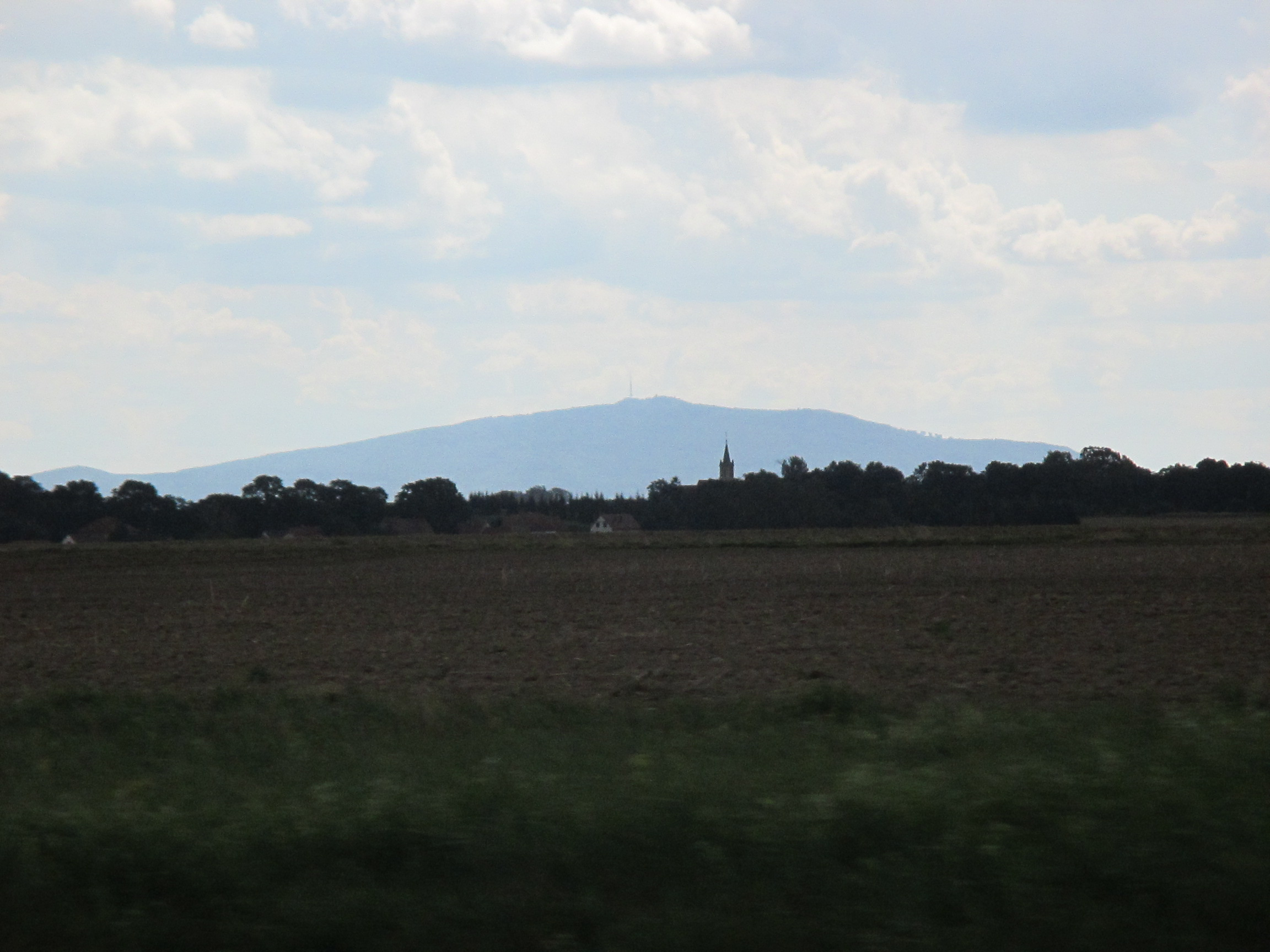
Ślęża seen from the north, from the A4 motorway

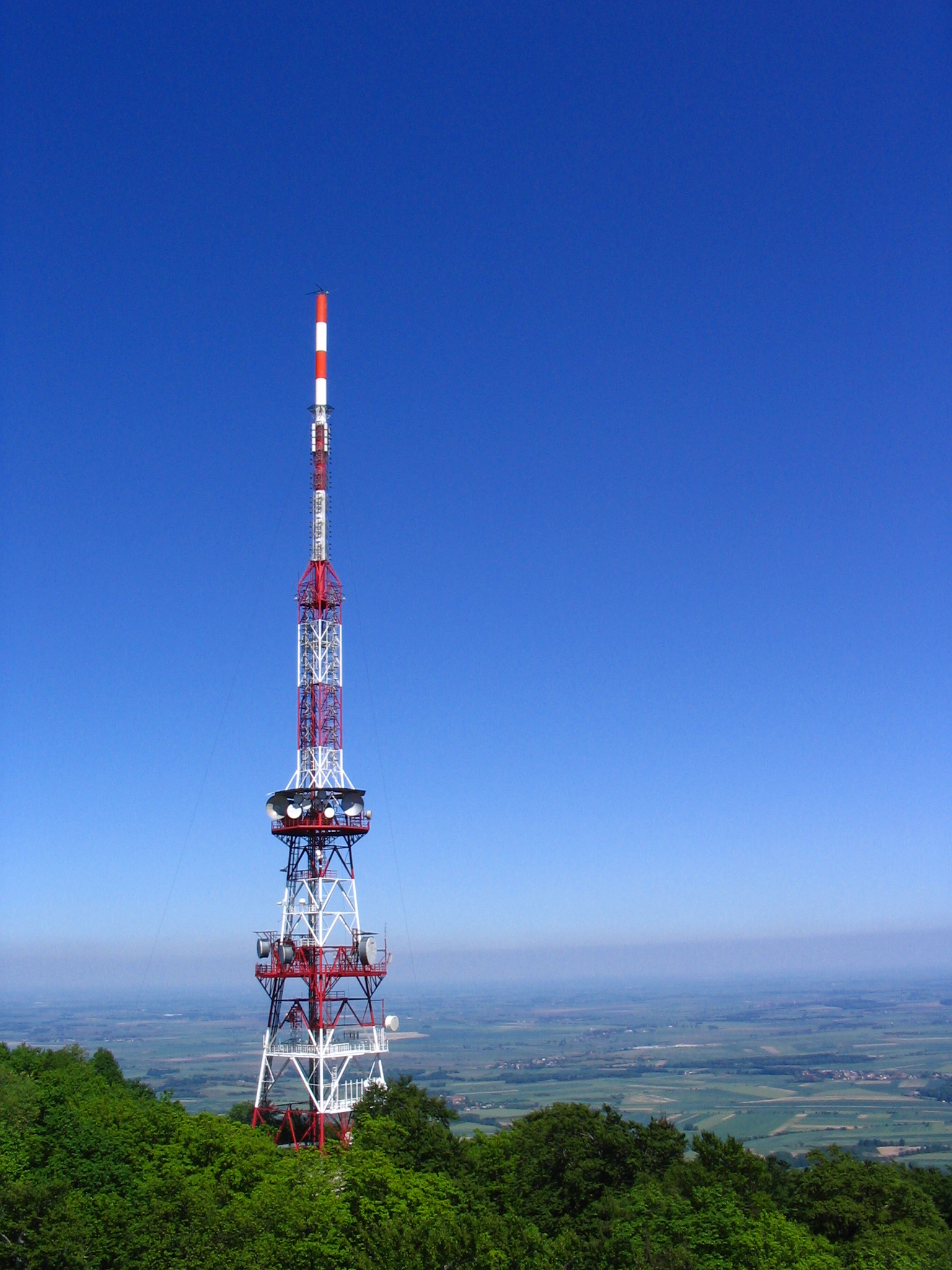
The transmitter

== See also ==
- Geography of Poland
