= Rosa Menga =

Italian doctor and politician

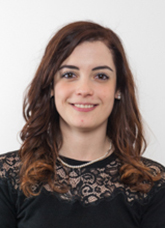

Member of the Chamber of Deputies
- In office 23 March 2018 – 12 October 2022

Personal details
- Born: 7 August 1992 (age 33)
- Party: Green Europe (2022–present)
- Other political affiliations: Five Star Movement (until 2022)
- Occupation: Politician

Rosa Menga (born 7 August 1992) is an Italian doctor and politician. She was elected as a member of the Five Star Movement and sat in the Chamber of Deputies from 2018 until 2022.

== Biography ==
Menga was born in Foggia and trained as a doctor. In 2017, she was a contestant on the game show Chain Reaction, and won over 100,000 euros. She was elected to the Chamber of Deputies in the 2018 general election.

She was expelled from her party on 19 February 2021 for not voting in confidence in the Draghi Cabinet. In March 2022, she joined the Green Europe party. She did not run in the 2022 Italian general election.

== See also ==
- List of members of the Italian Chamber of Deputies, 2018–2022
