= Wartenburg =

Wartenburg may refer to:

== Places ==
- Wartenburg (Kemberg), in the Wittenberg district, Saxony-Anhalt, Germany
- Wartenburg in Ostpreußen, German name for Barczewo, Warmian-Masurian Voivodeship, Poland

== People ==
- Ludwig Yorck von Wartenburg
- Paul Yorck von Wartenburg
- Peter Yorck von Wartenburg

== See also ==
- Wartenberg (disambiguation)
