= Landkreis Ohlau =

Administrative district of Prussian Silesia

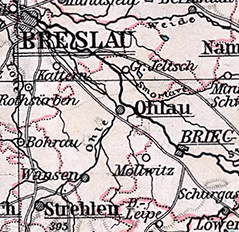
Map of Ohlau, 1905

The District of Ohlau (German: Landkreis Ohlau) was a Prussian district in Silesia, which existed between 1742 and 1932 and then from 1933 to 1945. The district office was in the city of Ohlau. The territory of this district is now part of the Lower Silesian Voivodeship in Poland.

== History ==
After conquering most of Silesia, King Frederick the Great introduced Prussian administrative structures in Lower Silesia by cabinet order on November 25, 1741. This included the establishment of two war and domain chambers in Breslau and Glogau as well as their subdivision into districts and the appointment of district administrators on January 1, 1742.

In the course of the Stein-Hardenberg reforms in 1815, the district of Ohlau was assigned to Regierungsbezirk Breslau in the Province of Silesia. In the course of border adjustments between the Silesian administrative districts, the town of Wansen and the villages of Alt Wansen, Bischwitz, Halbendorf, Johnwitz, Knischwitz and Spurwitz were transferred from the Grottkau district to the Ohlau district in 1816. During the district reform of January 1, 1818 in Regierungsbezirk Breslau, the villages of Beckern, Jeltsch, Lange, Neuvorwerk and Rattwitz were transferred from the Breslau district to the Ohlau district.

On November 8, 1919, the province of Silesia was dissolved and the new Province of Lower Silesia was formed from Regierungsbezirk Breslau and Regierungsbezirk Liegnitz. On October 1, 1932, the Ohlau district was temporarily dissolved. The town of Wansen and the rural communities of Alt Wansen, Brosewitz, Hermsdorf, Johnwitz, Knischwitz, Köchendorf, Marienau and Spurwitz were assigned to the Strehlen district, while the rest of the territory of the Ohlau district was merged into the Brieg district. The background to this were emergency ordinances of the Reich President on austerity measures, after which a number of districts were dissolved.

On October 1, 1933, the Ohlau district was re-established, but did not include the part that had fallen to the Strehlen district in 1932. On April 1, 1938, the provinces of Lower Silesia and Upper Silesia were merged to form the new province of Silesia. On January 18, 1941, the province of Silesia was dissolved again and the province of Lower Silesia was recreated. In the spring of 1945, the Red Army occupied the district. It was placed under Polish administration in the summer of 1945, in accordance with the Potsdam Agreement.

== Demographics ==
According to the Prussian census of 1861, the Ohlau district had a population of 51,988, of which 51,236 (98.55%) were Germans and 752 (1.45%) were Poles.

== Place names ==
In 1936/1937 some municipalities in the district were renamed:

- Goy → Göllnerhain,
- Graduschwitz → Grasau
- Groß Dupine → Groß Eichau
- Jankau → Grünaue
- Kontschwitz → Hohenlinde (Schlesien)
- Laskowitz → Markstädt
- Niefnig → Kresseheim
- Quosnitz → Quosdorf
- Radlowitz → Radwaldau
- Raduschkowitz → Freudenfeld
- Schwoika → Silingental
- Stannowitz → Eisfeld (Schlesien)
- Trattaschine → Hirschaue
