= Count Yorck von Wartenburg =

Count Yorck von Wartenburg may refer to:

- Ludwig Yorck von Wartenburg (Prussian Field Marshal, 1759 – 1830)
- Paul Yorck von Wartenburg (philosopher, 1835 – 1897)
- Peter Yorck von Wartenburg (resistance fighter, 1904 – 1944)
