= Ośno =

Ośno may refer to the following places in Poland:

- Ośno, Lower Silesian Voivodeship (south-west Poland)
- Ośno Lubuskie, Lubusz Voivodeship (west Poland)
- Ośno, Aleksandrów County in Kuyavian-Pomeranian Voivodeship (north-central Poland)
- Ośno, Żnin County in Kuyavian-Pomeranian Voivodeship (north-central Poland)
- Ośno, Pomeranian Voivodeship (north Poland)
