= Kowalów =

Kowalów may refer to the following places in Poland:

- Kowalów, Lower Silesian Voivodeship (south-west Poland)
- Kowalów, Lubusz Voivodeship (west Poland)
