= Paul Yorck von Wartenburg =

German lawyer, writer, and philosopher (1835–1897)

Graf (Count) Hans Ludwig David Paul Yorck von Wartenburg (1 April 1835 – 12 September 1897) was a German lawyer, writer, and philosopher.

== Life ==
Paul Yorck was born in Berlin. He was descended from the Prussian general Ludwig Yorck von Wartenburg. His father Hans David Ludwig (1805-1865) and his mother Bertha von Brause (1809-1845) were both related to Prussian military families. They lived in Klein Öls Castle, now part of the Oława district in Poland. His nephew was the jurist Peter Yorck von Wartenburg, who opposed Hitler.

After graduating from high school in 1854 in Breslau, Yorck enrolled at the University of Bonn, where he studied law and philosophy. In 1855 he moved to Breslau to continue his studies. In 1857 he traveled with his father Louis to Italy, starting an Italian diary of his own, which he continued on subsequent trips.

In Berlin he married, on 3 October 1860, Luise von Wildenbruch (1838-1918), niece of Prince Louis Ferdinand of Prussia and the older sister of the writer Ernst von Wildenbruch (1845-1909).

He moved to Potsdam in 1861, where he took the exam to become an assessor. In 1865, after his father's death, he managed the family properties that included an olive grove and the family castle.

In the late 1870s, he met Wilhelm Dilthey, with whom he became friends and correspondent for over twenty years (1877-1897) on philosophical subjects.

Yorck developed a hermeneutical philosophy of history in exchange with his friend Dilthey that was significant for the hermeneutics of Martin Heidegger and Hans-Georg Gadamer. Their correspondence influenced the early Heidegger's philosophy of history, especially central concepts of his early thought and Being and Time such as historicity, generation, and the difference between history as lived (Geschichte) and as an object of inquiry (Historie). Heidegger stated in Being and Time that he aimed to "cultivate the spirit of Count Yorck in the service of Dilthey's work.”

Yorck died in Klein Öls, Landkreis Ohlau, Silesia, Prussia.

== Publications ==
- Die Katharsis des Aristoteles und der Oedipus Coloneus des Sophokles, Berlin 1866.
- Briefwechsel zwischen Wilhelm Dilthey und dem Grafen Paul Yorck von Wartenburg 1877 - 1897, Halle 1923, Reprint Hildesheim 1995.
- Italienisches Tagebuch, Darmstadt 1927, 2. edition Leipzig 1939.
- Bewußtseinsstellung und Geschichte. Ein Fragment aus dem Philosophischen Nachlaß, Tübingen 1956, 2. edition Hamburg 1991.
- "Heraklit. Ein Fragment aus dem philosophischen Nachlass." Archiv für Philosophie 9: 214–289.
- "Das Fragment von 1891." Karfried Gründer, ed., Zur Philosophie des Grafen Paul Yorck von Wartenburg. Göttingen: Vandenhoeck & Rupprecht, 1970, pp. 308–353.
