= Wawrzyszów, Lower Silesian Voivodeship =

Wawrzyszów
- Village
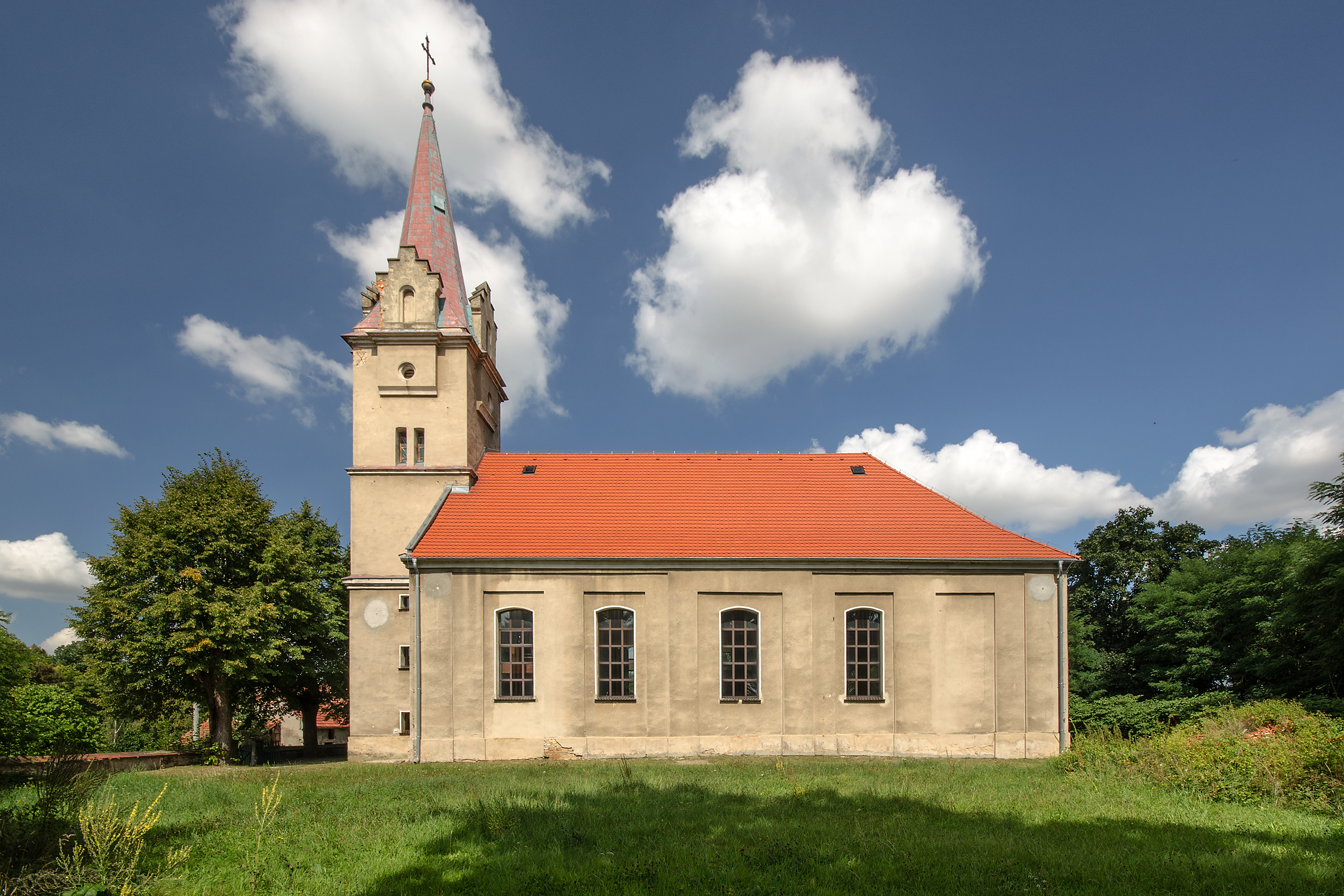

- Location within Poland
- Coordinates: 50°43′49″N 17°13′52″E
- Country: Poland
- Voivodeship: Lower Silesian
- County: Strzelin
- Gmina: Wiązów

Wawrzyszów [vaˈvʐɨʂuf] is a village in the administrative district of Gmina Wiązów, within Strzelin County, Lower Silesian Voivodeship, in south-western Poland.
