= Wawrzęcice =

- Village
- Location within Poland
- Coordinates: 50°50′23″N 17°08′17″E
- Country: Poland
- Voivodeship: Lower Silesian
- County: Strzelin
- Gmina: Wiązów

Wawrzęcice [vavʐɛnˈt͡ɕit͡sɛ] is a village in the administrative district of Gmina Wiązów, within Strzelin County, Lower Silesian Voivodeship, in south-western Poland.
