= Gmina Wiązów =

Gmina Wiązów Wiązów Commune
- Gmina
- Coat of arms
- Interactive map of Gmina Wiązów
- Coordinates (Wiązów): 50°48′55″N 17°12′13″E
- Country: Poland
- Voivodeship: Lower Silesian
- County: Strzelin
- Seat: Wiązów

Area
  - Total: 141.82 km^{2} (54.76 sq mi)

Population (2019-06-30)
  - Total: 7,174
  - Density: 50.59/km^{2} (131.0/sq mi)
  - Urban: 2,241
  - Rural: 4,933
- Website: http://www.wiazow.pl

Gmina Wiązów is an urban-rural gmina (administrative district) in Strzelin County, Lower Silesian Voivodeship, in south-western Poland. Its seat is the town of Wiązów, which lies approximately 11 kilometres (7 mi) east of Strzelin, and 37 kilometres (23 mi) south of the regional capital Wrocław.

The gmina covers an area of 141.82 square kilometres (54.8 sq mi), and as of 2019 its total population is 7,174.

== Neighbouring gminas ==
Gmina Wiązów is bordered by the gminas of Domaniów, Grodków, Oława, Olszanka, Przeworno, Skarbimierz and Strzelin.

== Villages ==
Apart from the town of Wiązów, the gmina contains the villages of Bryłów, Bryłówek, Częstocice, Gułów, Janowo, Jaworów, Jędrzychowice, Jutrzyna, Kalinowa, Kłosów, Kowalów, Krajno, Księżyce, Kucharzowice, Kurów, Kurowskie Chałupy, Łojowice, Miechowice Oławskie, Ośno, Stary Wiązów, Wawrzęcice, Wawrzyszów, Witowice, Wyszonowice and Zborowice.
