= Battle of Mesoten =

1812 battle during the French invasion of Russia

Battle of Mesothen
- Part of the French invasion of Russia
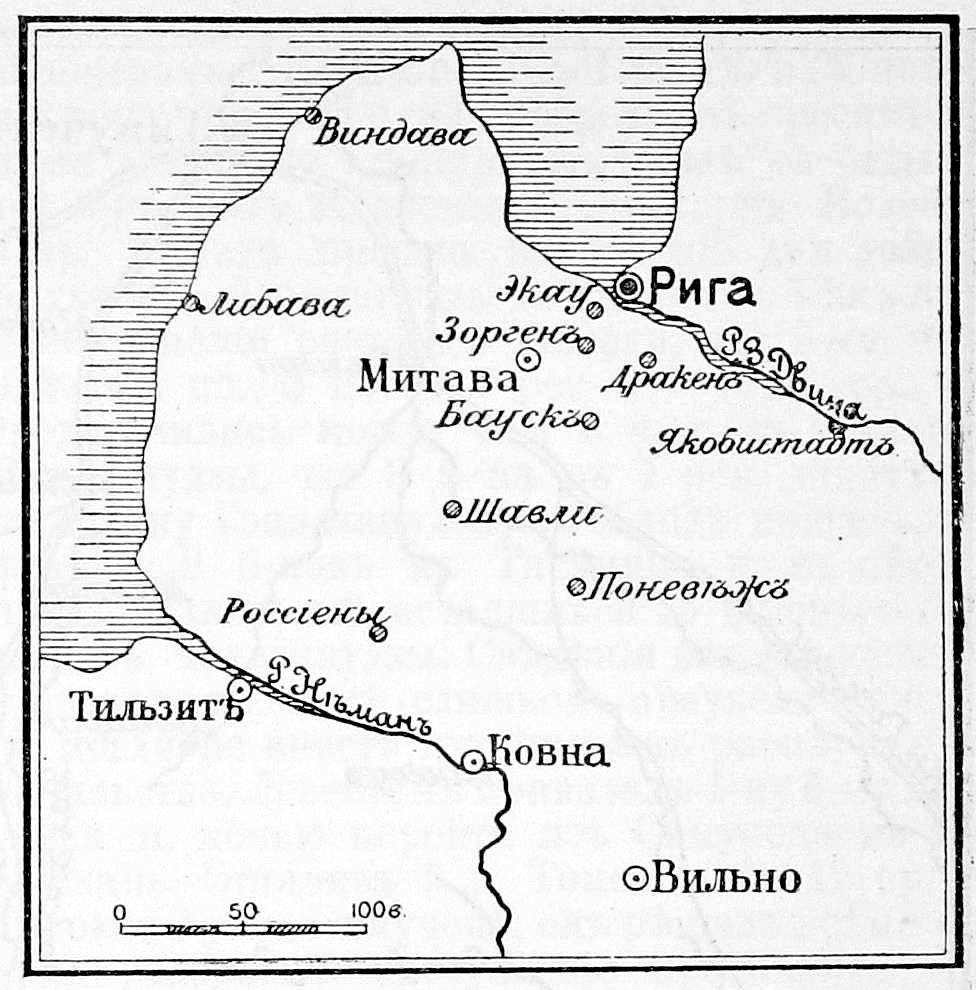
- Theater of military operations
Date	26–30 September to 1 October 1812
Location	Mežotne, Russian Empire 56°26′N 24°03′E
Result	Prussian victory

Belligerents
Russian Empire	(Kingdom of Prussia) Prussia

Commanders and leaders
(Russian Empire) Fabian Steinheil	(Kingdom of Prussia) Ludwig von Yorck

Strength
22,000	16,000

Casualties and losses
4,000	1,250

French invasion of Russia
current battle
Prussian corps
Napoleon
Austrian corps

The Battle of Mesothen (Mesoten) (Note: It is also mentioned as the battle of Bauske/Gräfenthal/Leutschkrug/Garosse. Bauske is today's Bauska, Gräfenthal is today's Grāvendāle, Garosse is today's Garoza. All in Latvia.) took place from 26–30 September to 1 October 1812, between the Russian Corps of Finland and the French-allied Prussian Auxiliary Corps. It was fought near the Latvian town of Mežotne (German: Mesothen/Mesoten), then part of the Courland Governorate. The battle involved several separate engagements that made it categorized as an operation.

== Background ==
In September 1812, Russian troops of General Steinheil entered Mitau, Gross Eckau and Bauska without a fight. However, they were spread out and vulnerable to enemy counterattacks. The Prussian command deployed its forces to defend the artillery stationed at the Bauska Castle and sent small squads to the ford across the river Lielupe.

== Battle ==
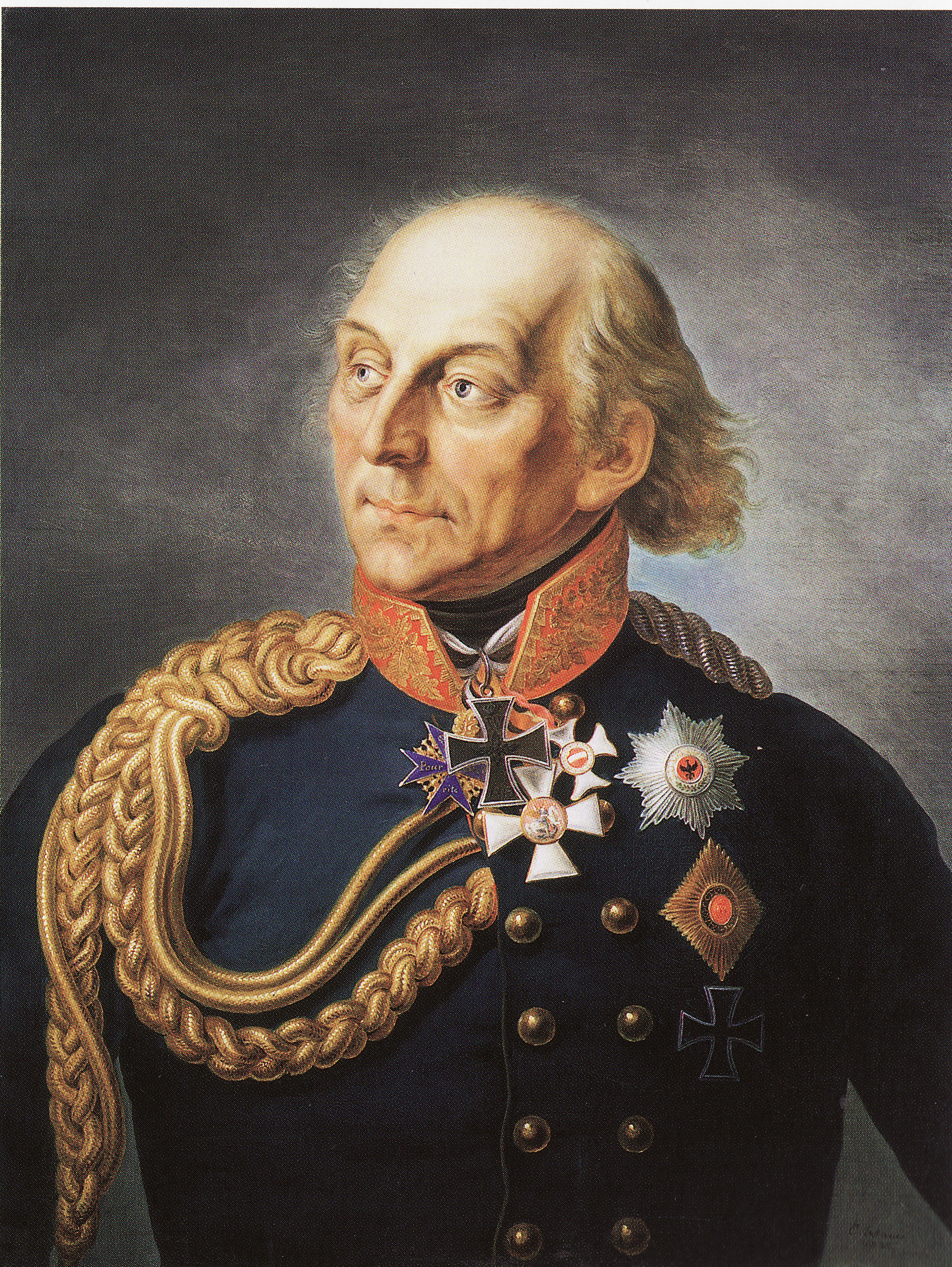
Hans David Ludwig Yorck von Wartenburg

On September 29, the Prussians launched a counterattack against the advancing Russian forces and attacked their vanguard at 5 pm. The struggle lasted until late at night and pushed the Russian troops back. On the same night, Ludwig von Yorck sent forces under the command of Friedrich Kleist against the troops of Alexander Belgard, which were chasing a retreating Prussian squad on the left bank of the Lielupe. The resulting battle was fought in darkness and involved only infantry units. Vastly outnumbering the enemy, the Prussians forced the Russian troops back and, after having received substantial reinforcements, went on the offensive.

== Aftermath ==
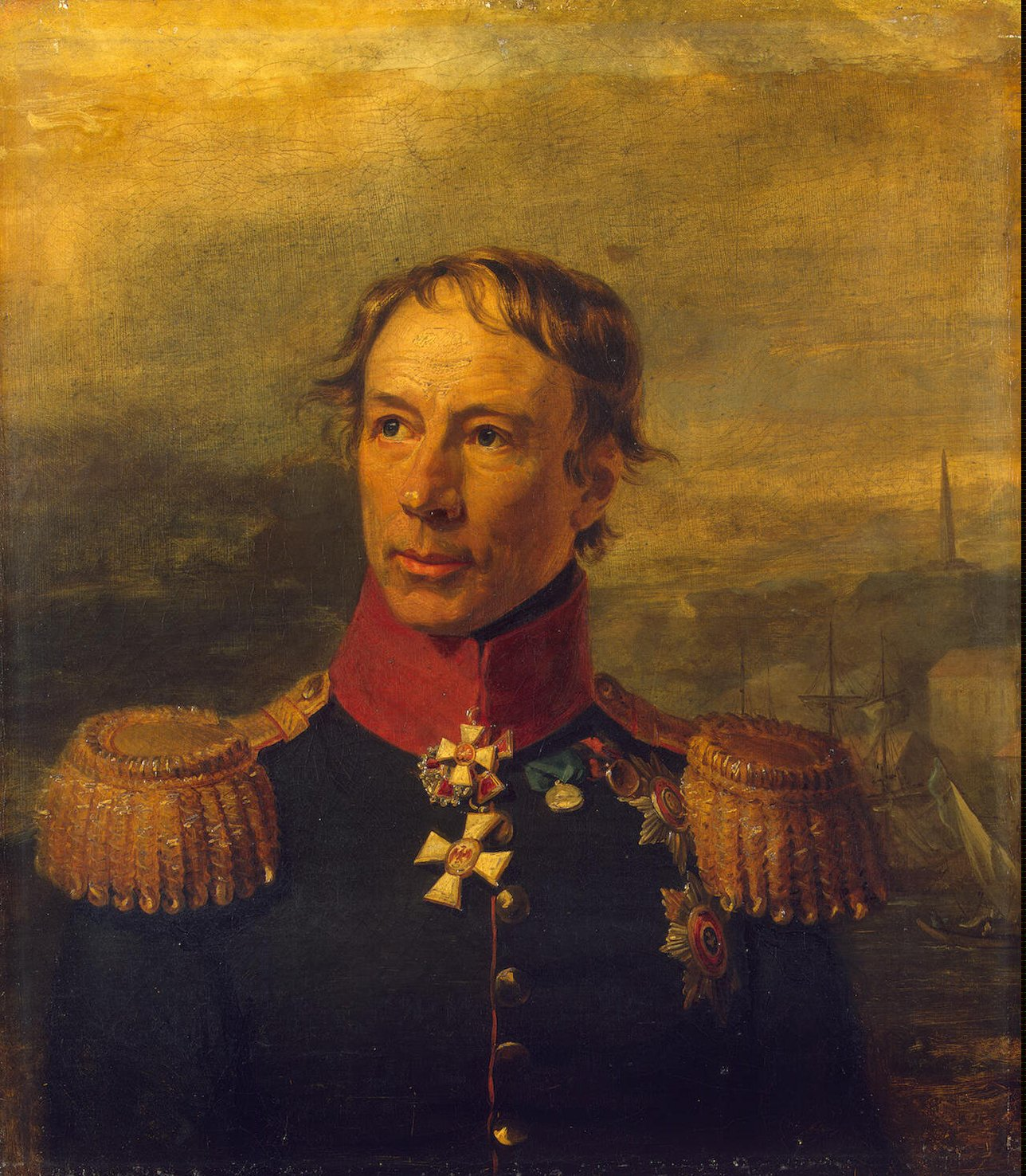
Faddey Fyodorovich Steinheil

As a result of the battle, Steinheil called off the advance and returned to Riga. Although a defeat, the battle eased some of the pressure on the Russian army of Peter Wittgenstein, helping it to eventually capture the city of Polotsk on October 20.

== See also ==
- List of battles of the French invasion of Russia

== Notes ==
Preceded by Battle of Valutino	Napoleonic Wars; Battle of Mesoten	Succeeded by Battle of Borodino
