= Ludwig Yorck von Wartenburg =

Prussian soldier (1759–1830)

Graf Ludwig Yorck von Wartenburg
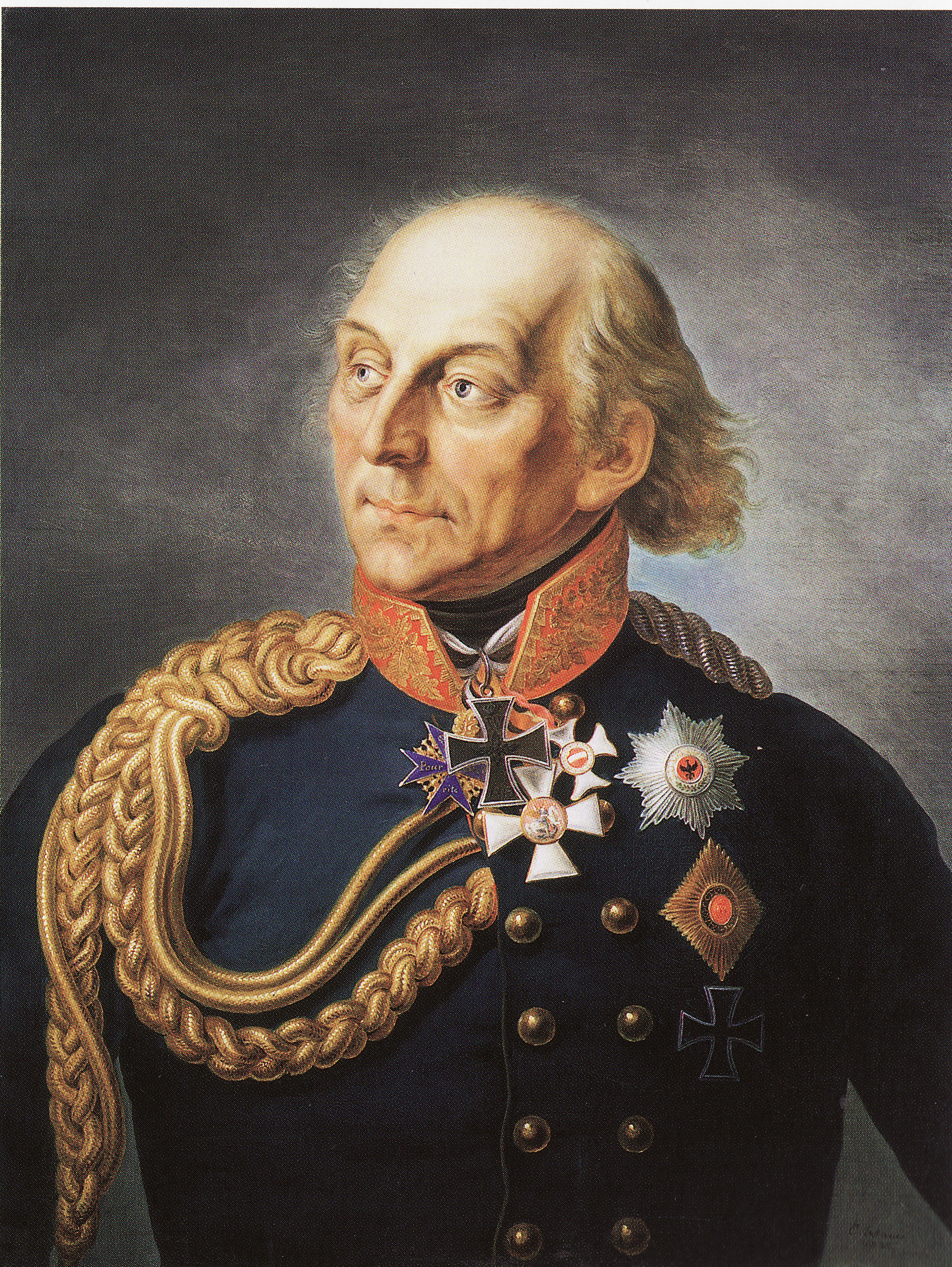
- Portrait by Ernst Gebauer, 1835
- Born: Johann David Ludwig von Yorck; 26 September 1759; Potsdam, Margraviate of Brandenburg, Kingdom of Prussia, Holy Roman Empire
- Died: 4 October 1830 (aged 71); Klein-Öls, Province of Silesia, Kingdom of Prussia, German Confederation (present-day Oleśnica Mała, Silesia Voivodeship, Poland)
- Military career
- Allegiance: Kingdom of Prussia; Dutch Republic
- Branch: Prussian Army; Dutch Army
- Service years: 1772–1779; 1782–1785; 1785/1786–1821
- Rank: Generalfeldmarschall (Prussia); Captain (Netherlands)
- Conflicts: War of the Bavarian Succession; Kościuszko Uprising; Napoleonic Wars; Battle of Nossentin; Battle of Mesoten; Battle of Wartenburg; Battle of Château-Thierry
- Awards: Grand Cross of the Iron Cross; Pour le Mérite; Order of St. George

Johann David Ludwig Graf Yorck von Wartenburg (born von Yorck; 26 September 1759 – 4 October 1830) was a Prussian Generalfeldmarschall instrumental in the Kingdom of Prussia ending an alliance with France to form one with Russia during the War of the Sixth Coalition. Ludwig van Beethoven's "Yorckscher Marsch" is named in his honor.

The Field Marshal's surname is Yorck; Wartenburg is a battle-honour appended to the surname as a title of distinction (cf. Britain's Montgomery of Alamein).

== Background ==
Yorck's father, David Jonathan von Yorck, was born in Rowe in the Prussian Province of Pomerania (now Rowy, Poland), to Jan Jarka, a Lutheran pastor, whose family came from a small manor in Gross Gustkow (hence the name von Gostkowski) and traced its origins from Pomeranian Kashubians. David Jonathan von Yorck served as a captain (Hauptmann) in the Prussian Army under King Frederick the Great; Yorck's mother Maria Sophia Pflug was the daughter of a Potsdam artisan. Their son Ludwig was born in Potsdam in 1759; the couple married in 1763. Ludwig's father changed his name from Jark(a) to Yorck to make it more English (York) and dropped the von Gostkowski.

== Career ==
Yorck entered the Prussian Army in 1772 and reached the rank of lieutenant in 1777. After seven years' service, however, he was cashiered for insubordination, having reproached his superior for plundering during the War of the Bavarian Succession when in 1779, during the Guard Parade, Yorck expressed his contempt for him. He spent one year's confinement in Fort Friedrichsburg, Königsberg, after which King Frederick the Great denied him re-employment.

Yorck left Prussia and joined the Swiss mercenaries in Dutch service in 1781. He took part in the operations of 1783-84 in the East Indies as a captain of the Regiment de Meuron. He also participated with the French army in a battle against the British in Cape Town. Returning to Potsdam in 1786 he was, on the death of Frederick the Great, reinstated in the army by Frederick William II, from 1792 with the rank of major. In 1794/95 he participated in the operations in Poland during the Kościuszko Uprising, distinguishing himself especially in the Szczekociny.

From 1799, Yorck began to make a name for himself as commander of a light infantry (Jäger) regiment, being one of the first to emphasize the training of skirmishers. In 1805, with the rank of Oberst, he was appointed to command an infantry brigade as a vanguard force of Duke Karl August of Saxe-Weimar during the War of the Fourth Coalition. In the disastrous Jena campaign, he was a conspicuous and successful rearguard commander, especially at Altenzaun. Having crossed the Elbe river and Harz mountains, he was taken prisoner, severely wounded, in the last stand of Blücher's corps at Lübeck.

In the reorganization of the Prussian army which followed the 1807 Treaty of Tilsit, Yorck was one of the leading figures. At first major-general commanding the West Prussian brigade, afterwards inspector-general of light infantry, he was finally appointed second in command to General Grawert, the leader of the auxiliary corps which Prussia was compelled to send in support of Napoleon's invasion of Russia. The two generals did not agree, Grawert being an open partisan of the French alliance, and Yorck an ardent Prussian patriot, but Grawert soon retired and Yorck assumed the command.

Opposed in his advance on Riga by the Russian General Steingel, Yorck displayed great skill in a series of battles which ended in the retreat of the enemy to Riga. Throughout the campaign he had been the object of many overtures from the enemy's generals, and though he had hitherto rejected them, it was soon clear to him that the French Grand Army was doomed. Marshal MacDonald, his immediate French superior, retreated before the corps of Diebitsch, and Yorck found himself isolated. As a soldier his duty was to break through, but as a Prussian patriot his position was more difficult. He had to judge whether the moment was favorable for the war of Prussia's liberation; and, whatever might be the enthusiasm of his junior staff officers, Yorck had no illusions as to the safety of his own head. On 20 December, the general made up his mind.

The Convention of Tauroggen armistice, signed by Diebitsch and Yorck without the consent of their king, declared the Prussian corps "neutral". The news was received with the wildest enthusiasm, but the Prussian Court dared not yet throw off the mask, and an order was despatched suspending Yorck from his command pending a court-martial. Diebitsch refused to let the bearer pass through his lines, and the general was finally absolved when the Treaty of Kalisz placed Prussia on the side of the Allies. Yorck's act proved to be a significant turning point in Prussian history. His veterans formed the nucleus of the forces of East Prussia, and Yorck himself in public took the final step by declaring war on Napoleon as the commander of those forces.

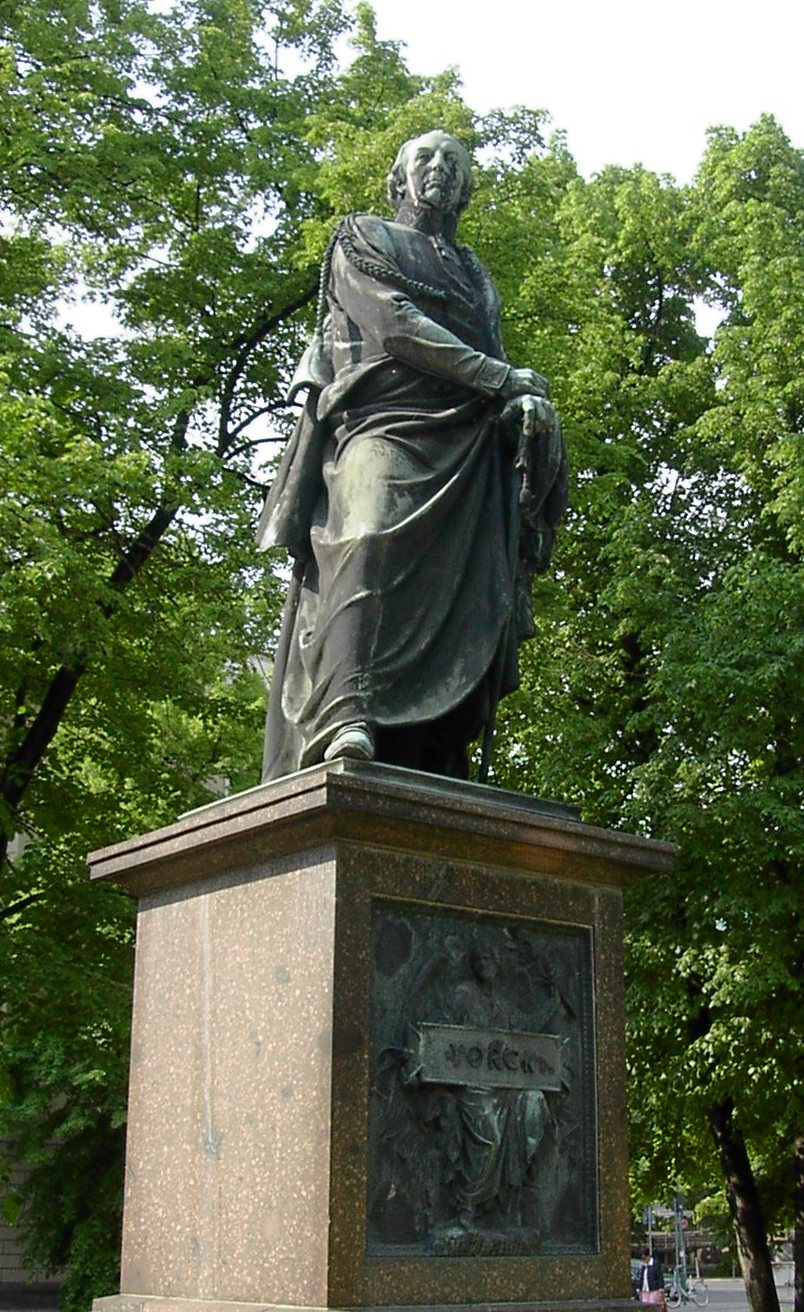
Statue of Yorck von Wartenburg on the Unter den Linden, Berlin, by Christian Daniel Rauch

On 17 March 1813, Yorck made his entry into Berlin in the midst of the wildest exuberance of patriotic joy. On the same day, the king declared war on France. During 1813-14, Yorck led his veterans with conspicuous success. He covered Blücher's retreat after Bautzen and took a decisive part in the battles on the Katzbach. In the advance on Leipzig, his corps won the action of Wartenburg (3 October) and took part in the crowning victory in the Battle of the Nations of 18 October. In the campaign in France, Yorck drew off the shattered remnants of Osten-Sacken's corps at Montmirail, and decided the day at Laon.

The storming of Paris was Yorck's last fight. In the campaign of 1815, none of the older men were employed in Blücher's army, in order that August von Gneisenau might be free to assume command in case of the old prince's death. Yorck was appointed to a reserve corps in Prussia, and, feeling that his services were no longer required, he retired from the army. His master would not accept his resignation for a considerable time, and in 1821 made him Generalfeldmarschall. He had been made Graf Yorck von Wartenburg in 1814. The remainder of his life was spent on his estate of Klein-Öls (today Oleśnica Mała, Poland) in Silesia, a gift of the king. A statue by Christian Daniel Rauch was erected in Yorck's honor in Berlin in 1855. The former football club Yorck Boyen Insterburg was also named in honor of Yorck.

A 1931 film Yorck was made about him with Werner Krauss playing the General.

== Notable descendants ==
Yorck was the great-grandfather of the late-nineteenth-century philosopher Paul Yorck von Wartenburg and the great-great-great-grandfather of Peter Yorck von Wartenburg, a member of the German resistance during the Nazi regime.

== See also ==
- Berlin Yorckstraße station

== Sources ==
- "Йорк, Иоганн Давид Людвиг" . Brockhaus and Efron Encyclopedic Dictionary (in Russian). 1906.
