= Miechowice Oławskie =

- Village
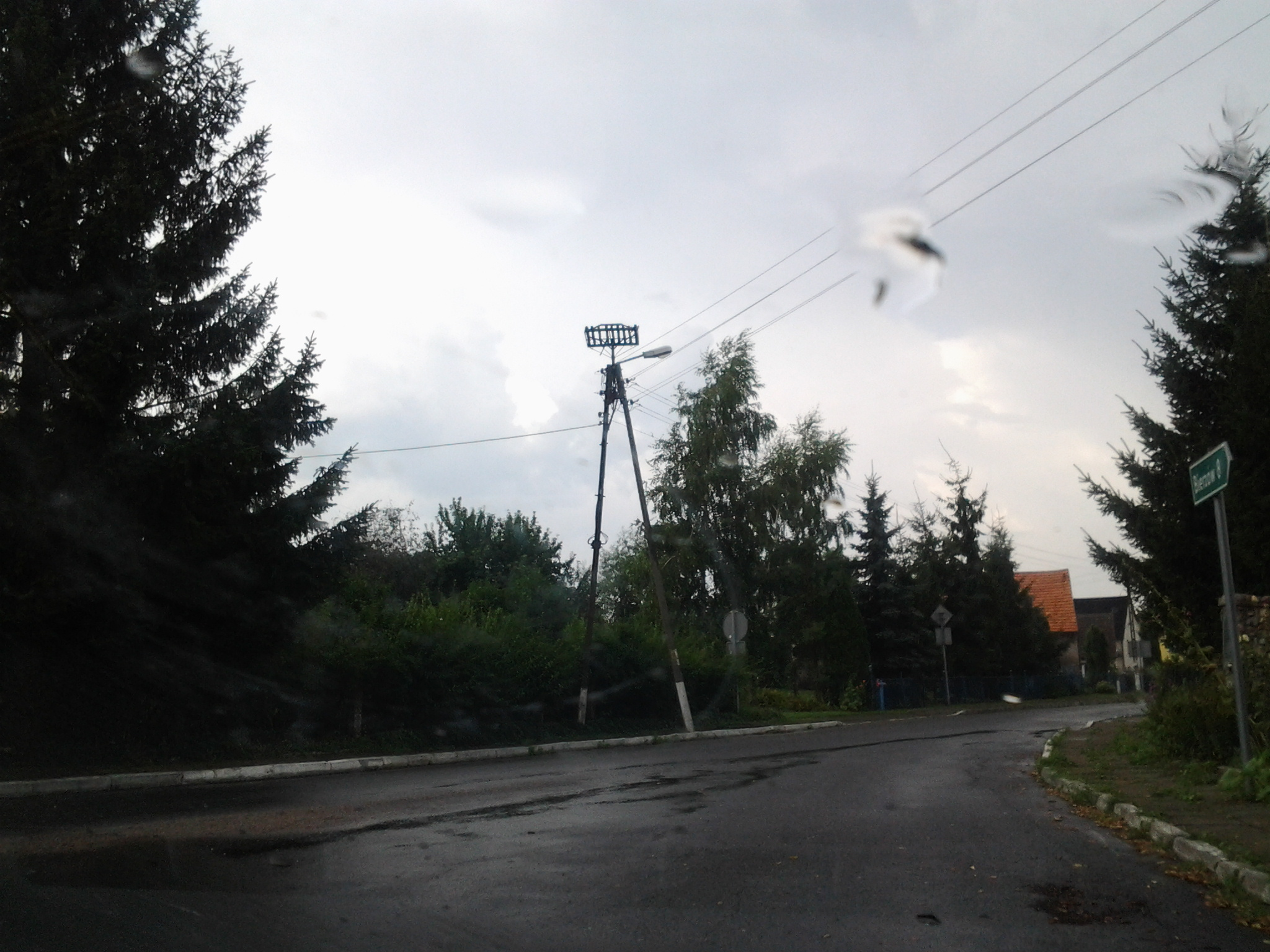

- Location within Poland
- Coordinates: 50°48′43″N 17°14′53″E
- Country: Poland
- Voivodeship: Lower Silesian
- County: Strzelin
- Gmina: Wiązów

Miechowice Oławskie [mjɛxɔˈvit͡sɛ ɔˈwafskʲɛ] is a village in the administrative district of Gmina Wiązów, within Strzelin County, Lower Silesian Voivodeship, in south-western Poland.
