= Kucharzowice =

- Village
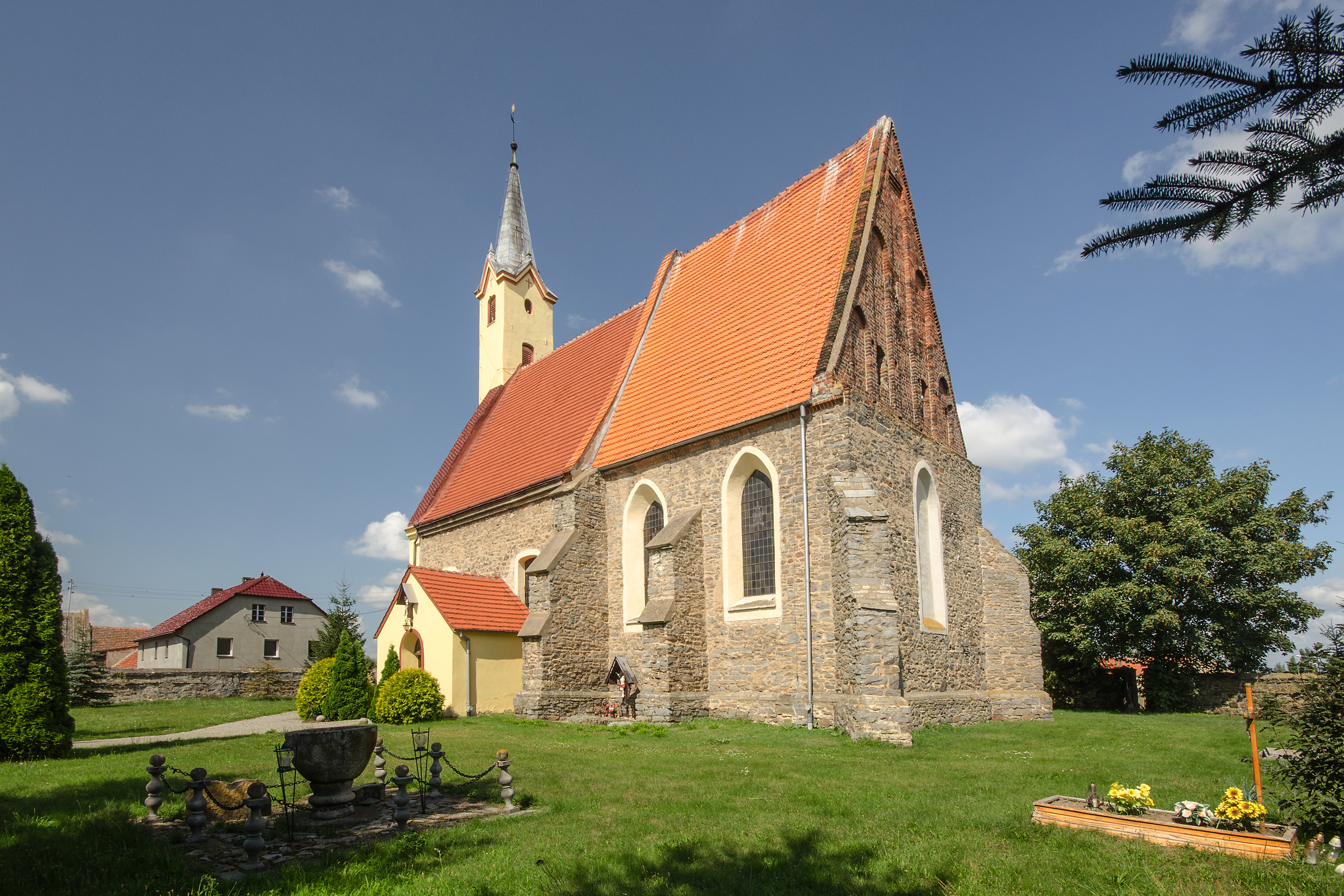
- Catholic church

- Location within Poland
- Coordinates: 50°47′N 17°15′E
- Country: Poland
- Voivodeship: Lower Silesian
- County: Strzelin
- Gmina: Wiązów

Kucharzowice [kuxaʐɔˈvit͡sɛ] is a village in the administrative district of Gmina Wiązów, within Strzelin County, Lower Silesian Voivodeship, in south-western Poland.
