= Wyszonowice =

- Village
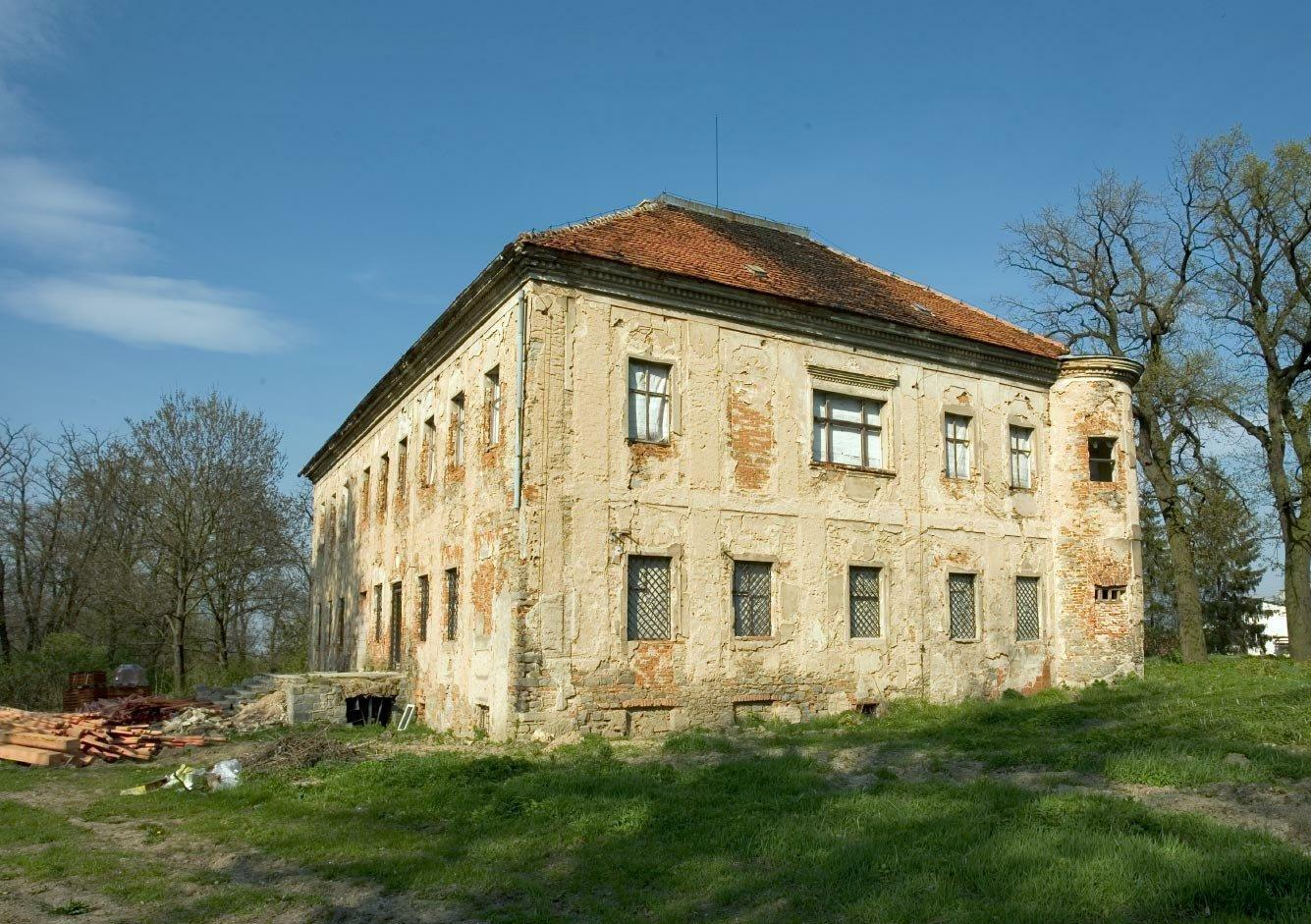
- Palace

- Location within Poland
- Coordinates: 50°46′N 17°10′E
- Country: Poland
- Voivodeship: Lower Silesian
- County: Strzelin
- Gmina: Wiązów

Wyszonowice [vɨʂɔnɔˈvit͡sɛ] is a village in the administrative district of Gmina Wiązów, within Strzelin County, Lower Silesian Voivodeship, in south-western Poland.
