= Jaworów, Lower Silesian Voivodeship =

Jaworów
- Village
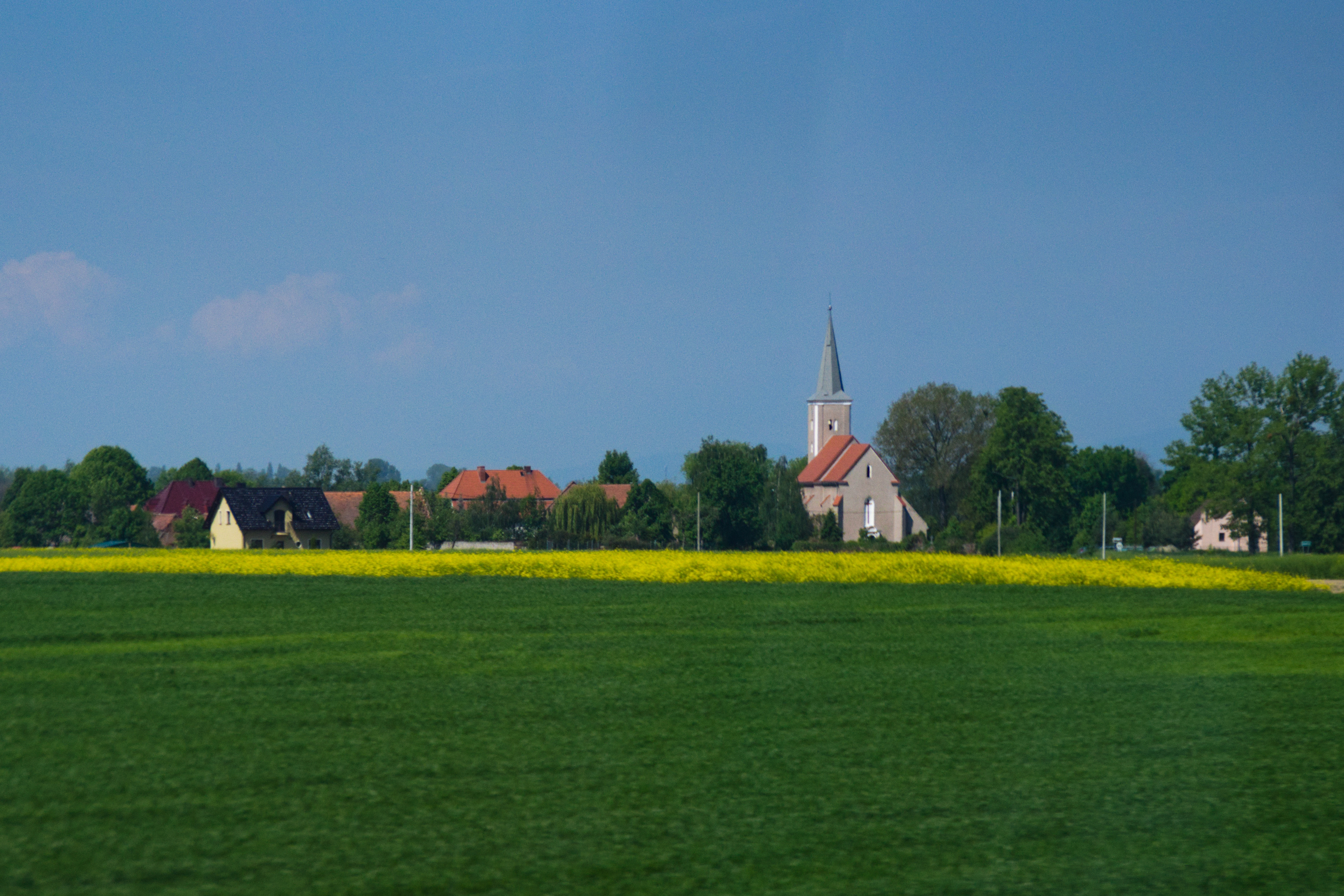
- Jaworów in 2019

- Location within Poland
- Coordinates: 50°48′02″N 17°18′28″E
- Country: Poland
- Voivodeship: Lower Silesian
- County: Strzelin
- Gmina: Wiązów

Jaworów [jaˈvɔruf] is a village in the administrative district of Gmina Wiązów, within Strzelin County, Lower Silesian Voivodeship, in south-western Poland.

== Famous people ==
The town was a favourite residence of John III Sobieski, who there received the congratulations of the pope and the Venetian republic on his success in the Battle of Vienna (1683).

At Jaworów Peter the Great was betrothed to Catherine I.
