= Gułów, Lower Silesian Voivodeship =

Gułów
- Village
- Location within Poland
- Coordinates: 50°49′54″N 17°10′11″E
- Country: Poland
- Voivodeship: Lower Silesian
- County: Strzelin
- Gmina: Wiązów

Gułów [ˈɡuwuf] is a village in the administrative district of Gmina Wiązów, within Strzelin County, Lower Silesian Voivodeship, in south-western Poland.
