= Ernst Gebauer =

German painter (1782–1865)

Ernst Gebauer (23 May 1782 – 7 July 1865) was a German painter. His works from the War of Liberation against Napoleon's rule are particularly well known.

== Gallery ==
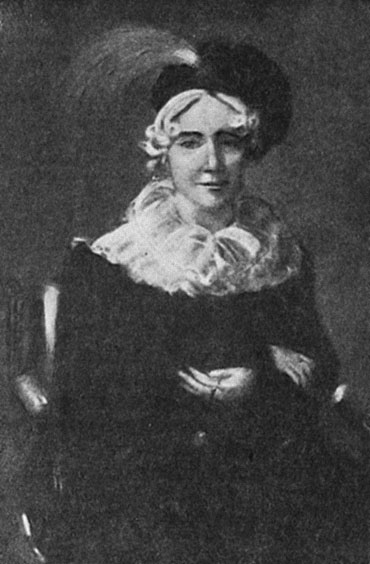
Helena Radziwiłł

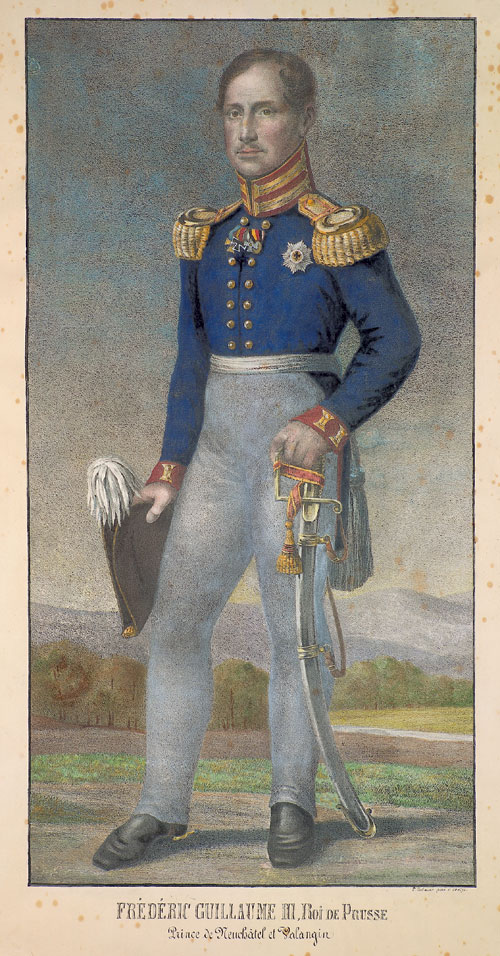
Friedrich Wilhelm III

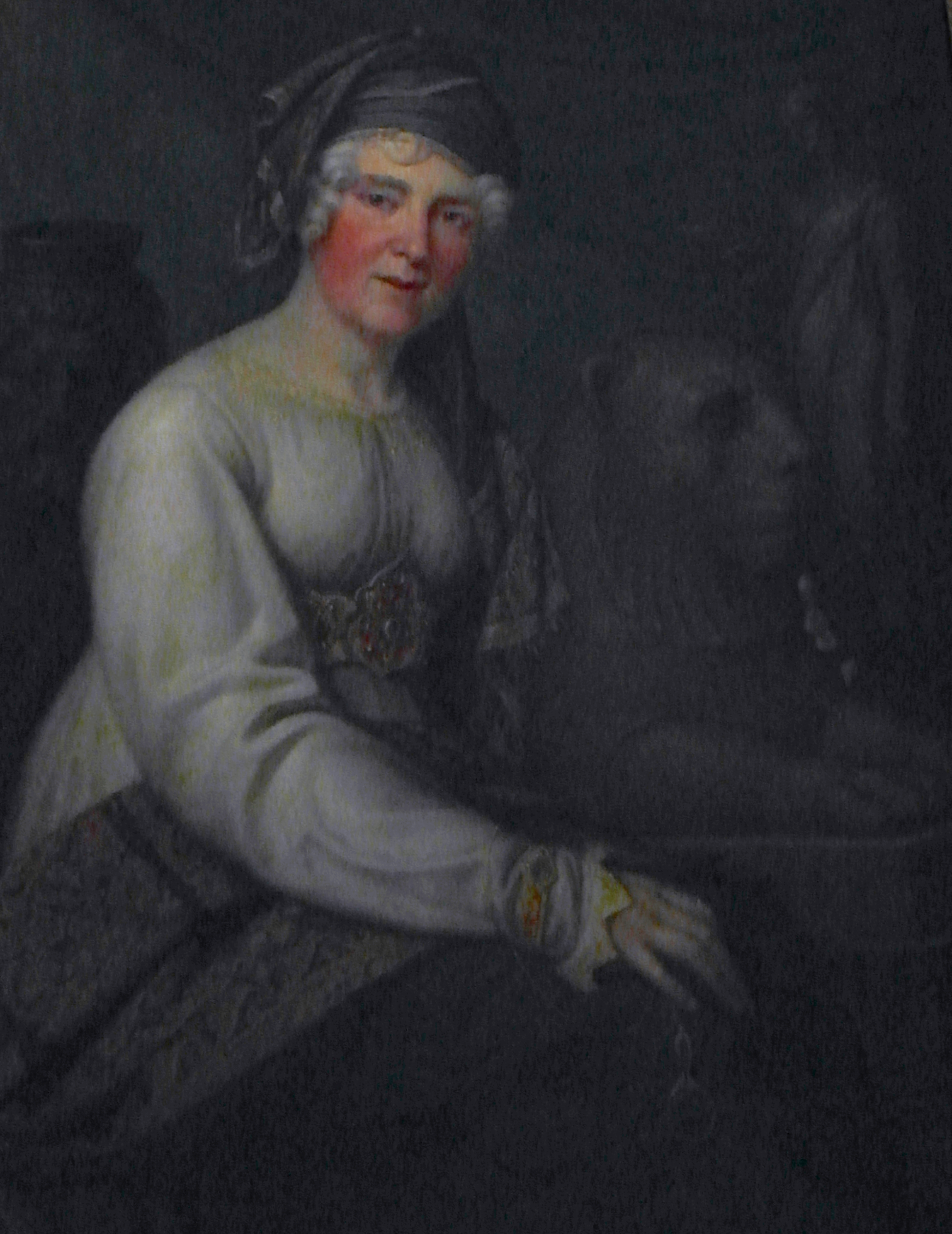
Helena Radziwiłł

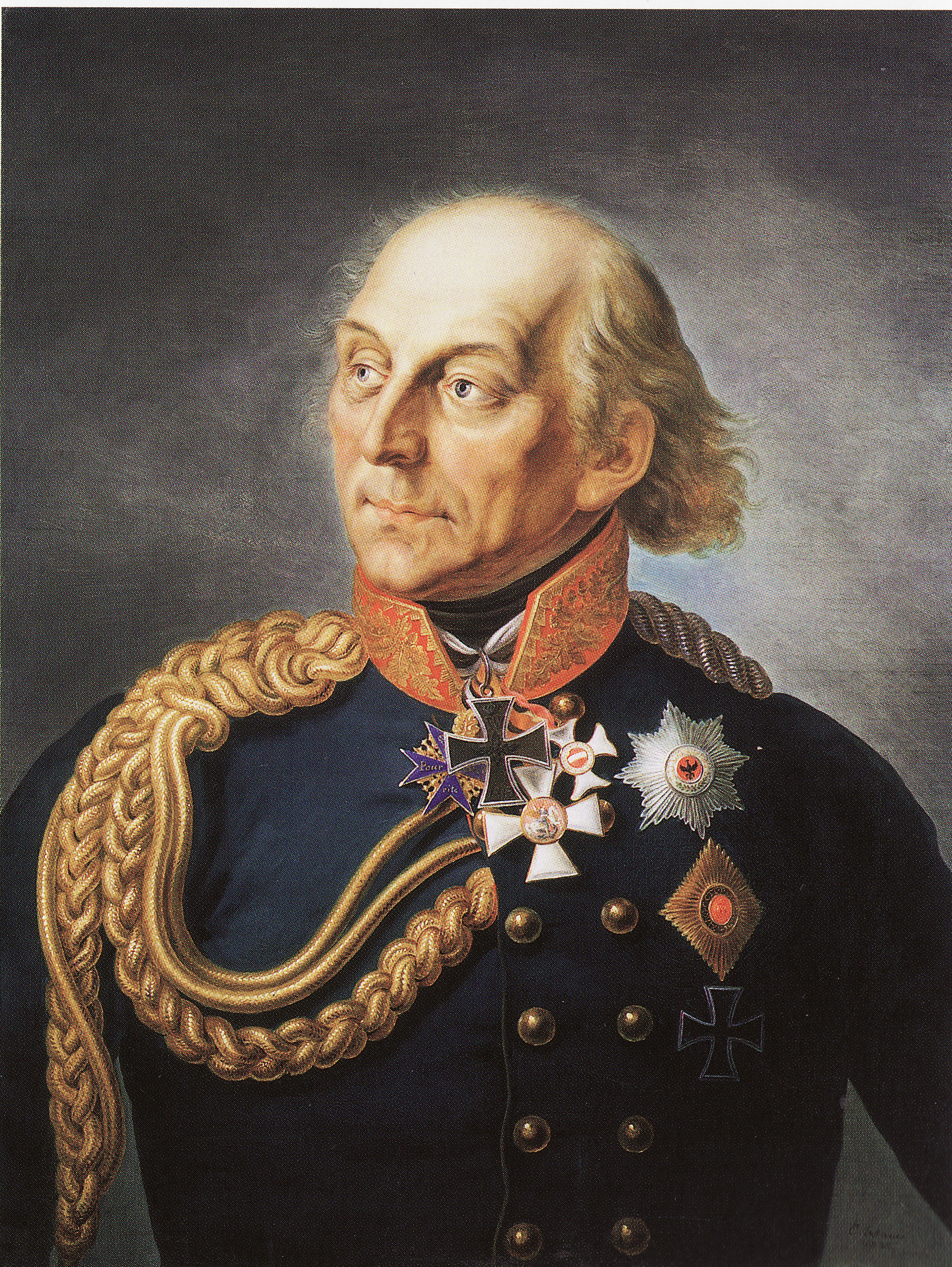
Ludwig Yorck von Wartenburg

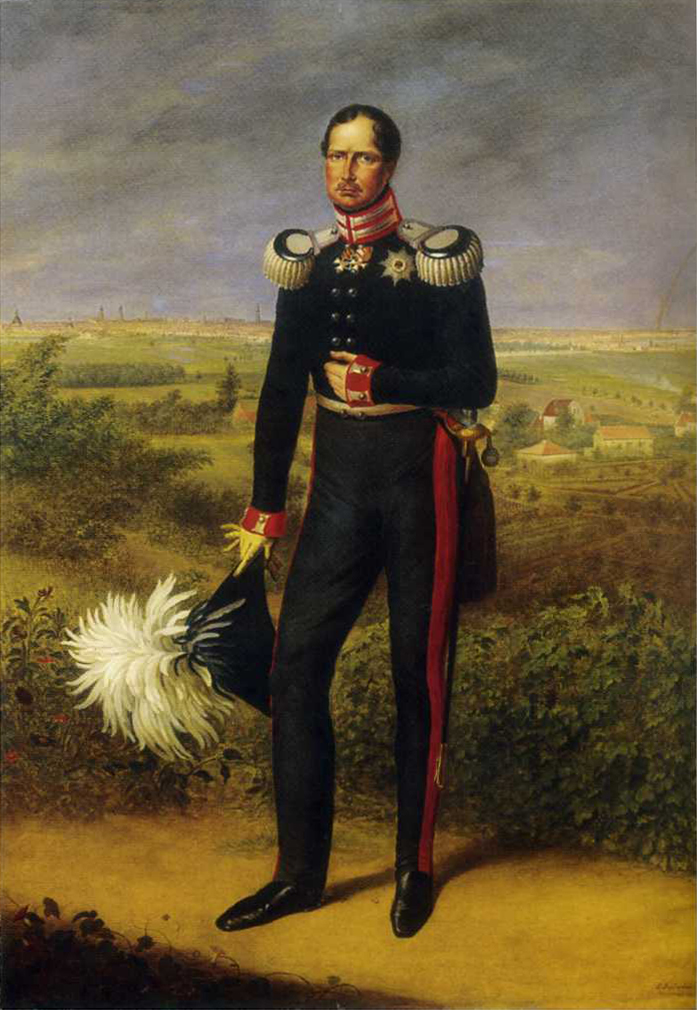
Friedrich Wilhelm III

== Sources ==
- "Gebauer, Paul Erns". Benezit Dictionary of Artists. 2011.
