= Jędrzychowice, Strzelin County =

Jędrzychowice
- Village
- Location within Poland
- Coordinates: 50°51′12″N 17°11′11″E
- Country: Poland
- Voivodeship: Lower Silesian
- County: Strzelin
- Gmina: Wiązów

Jędrzychowice [jɛndʐɨxɔˈvit͡sɛ] is a village in the administrative district of Gmina Wiązów, within Strzelin County, Lower Silesian Voivodeship, in south-western Poland.

== Notable residents ==
- Rudolf Geisler (1911–1944), Wehrmacht officer
