= Kurów, Lower Silesian Voivodeship =

Kurów
- Village
- Location within Poland
- Coordinates: 50°51′32″N 17°12′42″E
- Country: Poland
- Voivodeship: Lower Silesian
- County: Strzelin
- Gmina: Wiązów

Kurów [ˈkuruf] is a village in the administrative district of Gmina Wiązów, within Strzelin County, Lower Silesian Voivodeship, in south-western Poland.
