= Kalinowa, Lower Silesian Voivodeship =

Kalinowa
- Village
- Location within Poland
- Coordinates: 50°50′06″N 17°15′14″E
- Country: Poland
- Voivodeship: Lower Silesian
- County: Strzelin
- Gmina: Wiązów

Kalinowa [kaliˈnɔva] is a village in the administrative district of Gmina Wiązów, within Strzelin County, Lower Silesian Voivodeship, in south-western Poland.
