= Kłosów, Lower Silesian Voivodeship =

Kłosów
- Village
- Location within Poland
- Coordinates: 50°48′02″N 17°20′47″E
- Country: Poland
- Voivodeship: Lower Silesian
- County: Strzelin
- Gmina: Wiązów

Kłosów [ˈkwɔsuf] is a village in the administrative district of Gmina Wiązów, within Strzelin County, Lower Silesian Voivodeship, in south-western Poland.
