= Bryłówek =

- Village
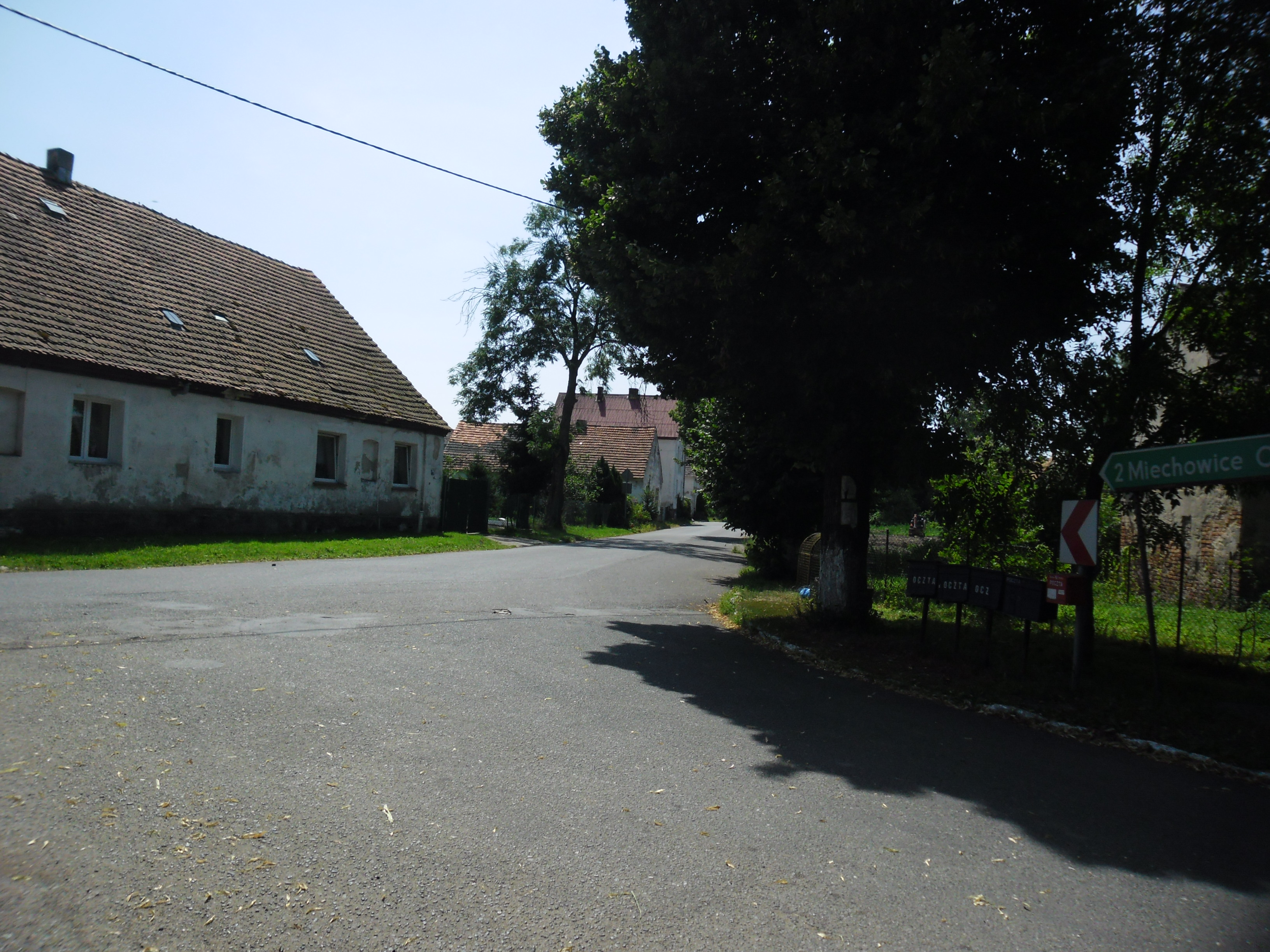

- Location within Poland
- Coordinates: 50°49′N 17°16′E
- Country: Poland
- Voivodeship: Lower Silesian
- County: Strzelin
- Gmina: Wiązów

Bryłówek [brɨˈwuvɛk] is a village in the administrative district of Gmina Wiązów, within Strzelin County, Lower Silesian Voivodeship, in south-western Poland.
