= Łojowice, Lower Silesian Voivodeship =

Łojowice
- Village
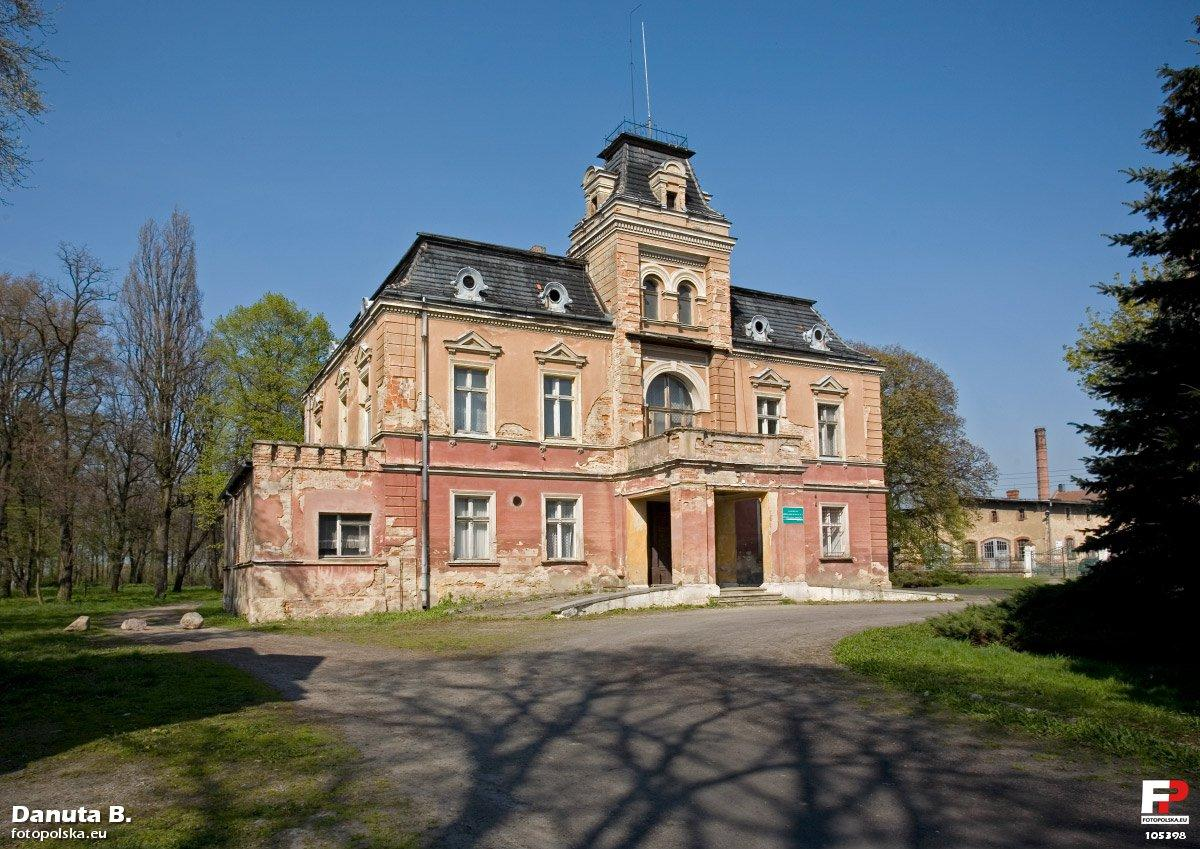
- 19th-century palace

- Location within Poland
- Coordinates: 50°44′N 17°13′E
- Country: Poland
- Voivodeship: Lower Silesian
- County: Strzelin
- Gmina: Wiązów

Łojowice [wɔjɔˈvit͡sɛ] is a village in the administrative district of Gmina Wiązów, within Strzelin County, Lower Silesian Voivodeship, in south-western Poland.

Between 1975 and 1998 it was in the administrative district of Wrocław.
