= Kowalów, Lower Silesian Voivodeship =

Kowalów
- Village
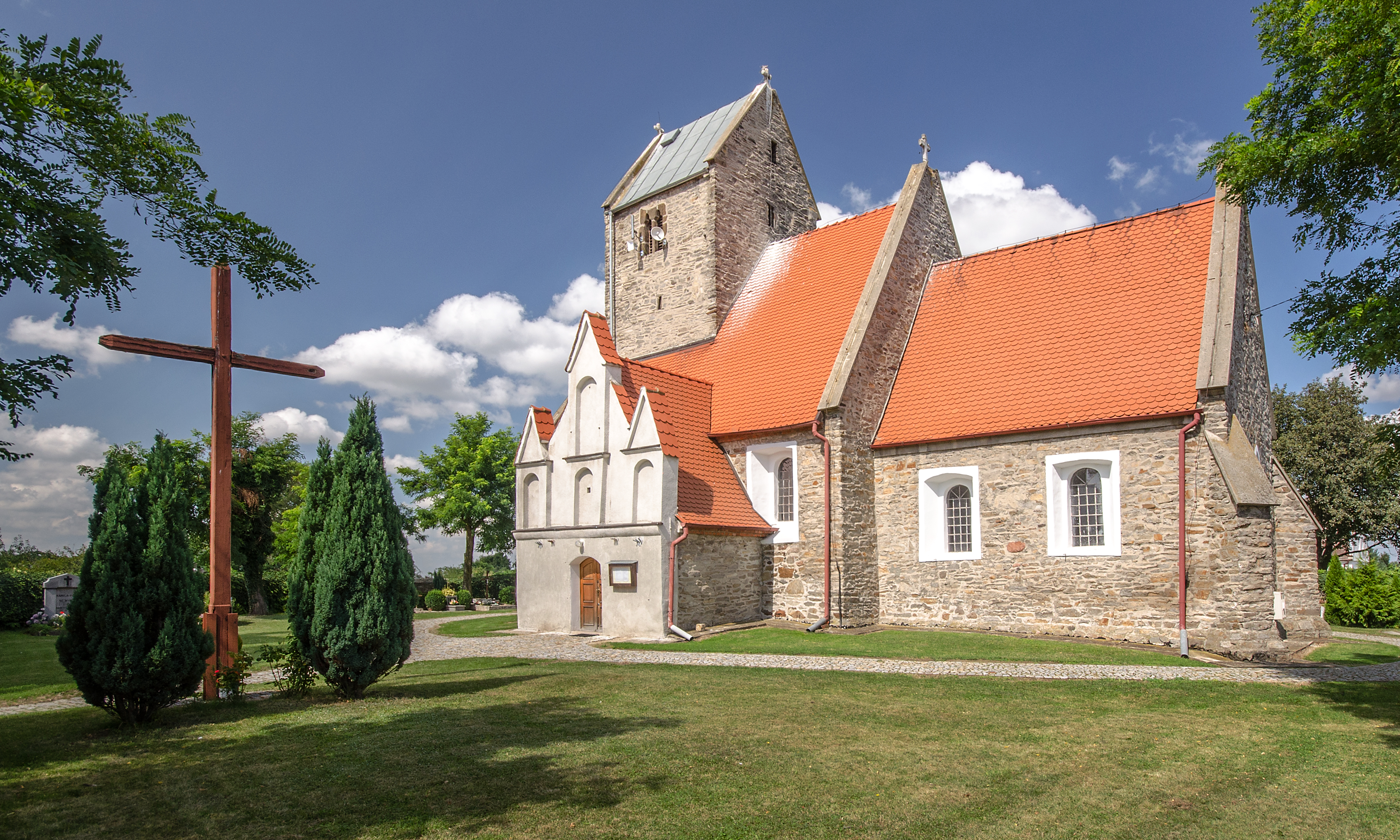
- Catholic church

- Location within Poland
- Coordinates: 50°45′42″N 17°13′43″E
- Country: Poland
- Voivodeship: Lower Silesian
- County: Strzelin
- Gmina: Wiązów

Kowalów [kɔˈvaluf] is a village in the administrative district of Gmina Wiązów, within Strzelin County, Lower Silesian Voivodeship, in south-western Poland.
