= Oleśnica Mała =

- Village
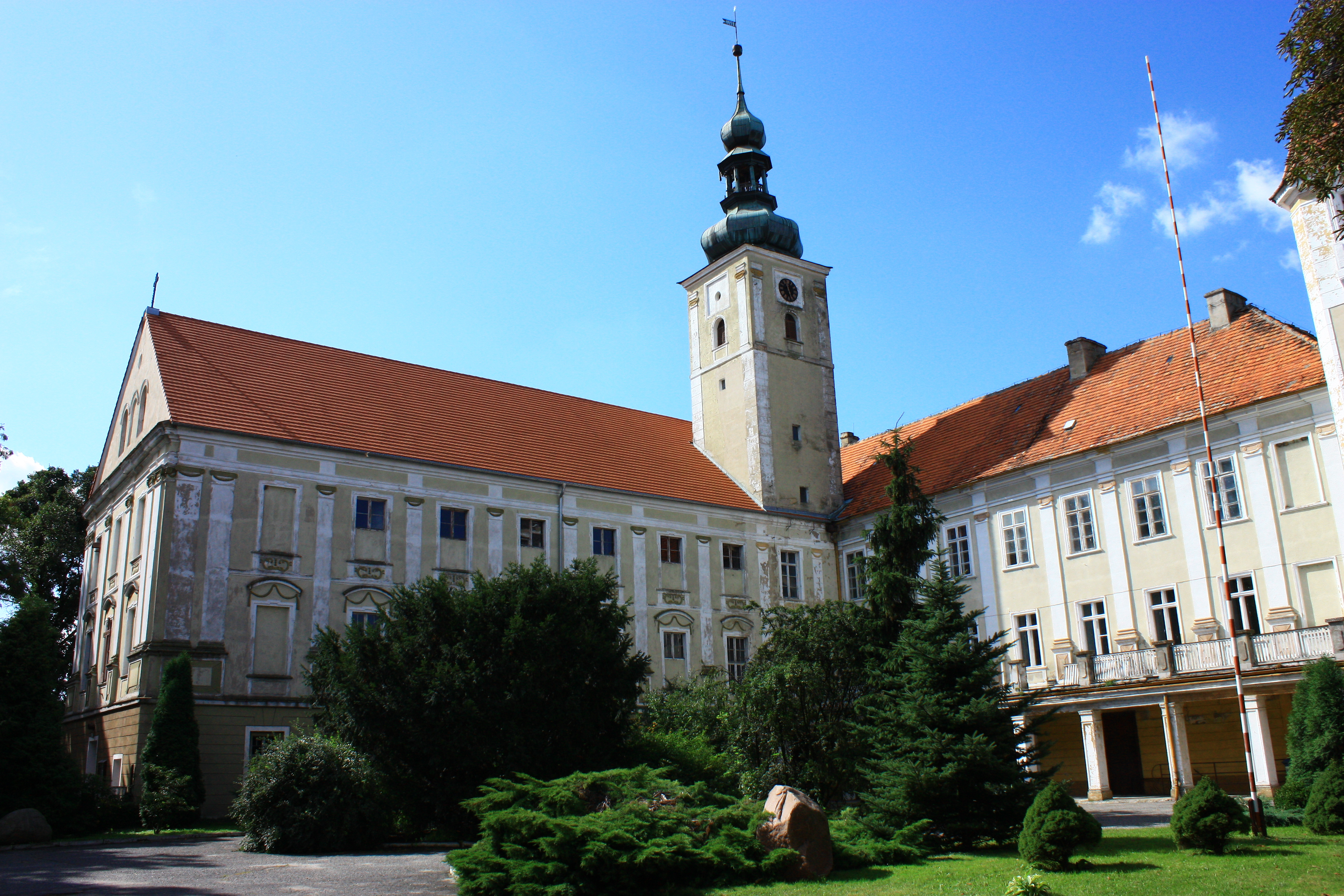
- Oleśnica Mała Castle

- Location within Poland
- Coordinates: 50°50′30″N 17°16′35″E
- Country: Poland
- Voivodeship: Lower Silesian
- County: Oława
- Gmina: Oława
- Time zone: UTC+1 (CET)
  - Summer (DST): UTC+2 (CEST)
- Vehicle registration: DOA

Oleśnica Mała [ɔlɛɕˈnit͡sa ˈmawa] is a village in the administrative district of Gmina Oława, within Oława County, Lower Silesian Voivodeship, in south-western Poland.

== History ==
The castle of Olesnic erected by the Piast duke Bolesław I the Tall of Silesia was first mentioned in an 1173 deed. Bolesław's son and successor Duke Henry I the Bearded and his wife Saint Hedwig of Andechs granted it to the Knights Templar in 1226. Upon the order's dissolution in 1314, the commandry passed to the Knights Hospitaller. The settlement arose around the castle within the Duchy of Brzeg under Ludwik I the Fair in the late 14th century.

The castle was devastated during the Thirty Years' War and afterwards rebuilt in a Baroque style. After in 1742 it had been annexed by Prussia, the commandry was secularised at the behest of King Frederick William III in 1810. After the War of the Sixth Coalition the king granted the estate to his victorious general Ludwig Yorck von Wartenburg. Klein Öls remained a possession of the Wartenburg noble family, Ludwig's descendant, the resistance fighter Peter Yorck von Wartenburg was born here in 1904.

The composer Carl Thiel (1862−1939) was born in the town.
