= Wiązów =

Town in Lower Silesian Voivodeship, Poland

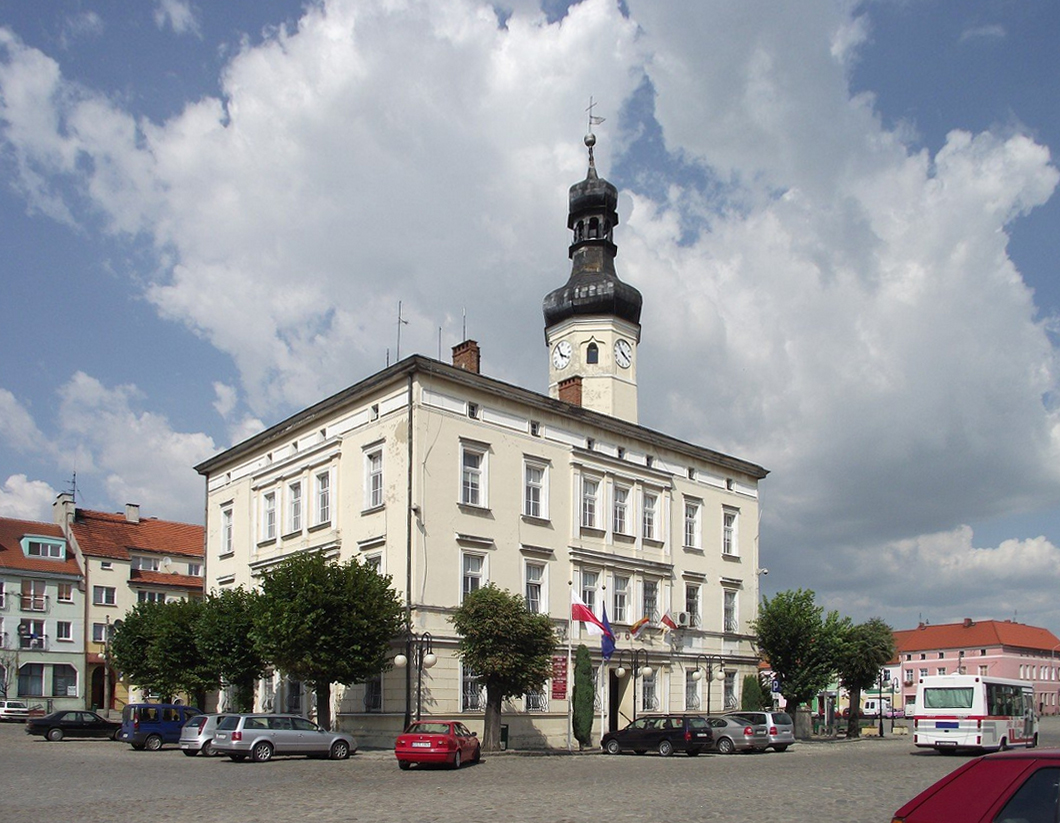
- Town hall

- Flag Coat of arms

- Location within Poland
- Coordinates: 50°48′55″N 17°12′13″E
- Country: Poland
- Voivodeship: Lower Silesian
- County: Strzelin
- Gmina: Wiązów
- First mentioned: 1155
- Town rights: 1252

Area
  - Total: 9.16 km^{2} (3.54 sq mi)
- Elevation: 152 m (499 ft)

Population (2019-06-30)
  - Total: 2,241
  - Density: 245/km^{2} (634/sq mi)
- Time zone: UTC+1 (CET)
  - Summer (DST): UTC+2 (CEST)
- Postal code: 57-120
- Vehicle registration: DST
- Website: https://www.wiazow.pl

Wiązów [ˈvjɔ̃zuf] (German: Wansen) is a town in Strzelin County, Lower Silesian Voivodeship, in south-western Poland. It is the seat of the administrative district (gmina) called Gmina Wiązów.

As at 2019, the town has a population of 2,241.

== Etymology ==
The exact origins of the etymology of the town of Wiązów are left unknown, but two theories have been formed. The first of which states the settlement's name originates from the Polish word for elm (wiąz); the other states the town's name comes from the word for snakes (węże). Both are documented by Polish writer Konstanty Damrot, in his 1896 publication documenting Silesian names, published in Bytom - "von wiąz - Ulme" (...) auch von wąż - die Schlange (...)." The former origin was also noted by German author Heinrich Adamy in 1888.

== History ==
The oldest known mention of Wiązów comes from 1155, when it was part of Piast-ruled Poland. In 1252, it was granted town rights by Duke Henry III the White.

In the final stages of World War II, a German-organized death march of Allied prisoners of war from the Stalag Luft 7 POW camp stopped in the town on 23 January 1945.
