= Księżyce =

- Village
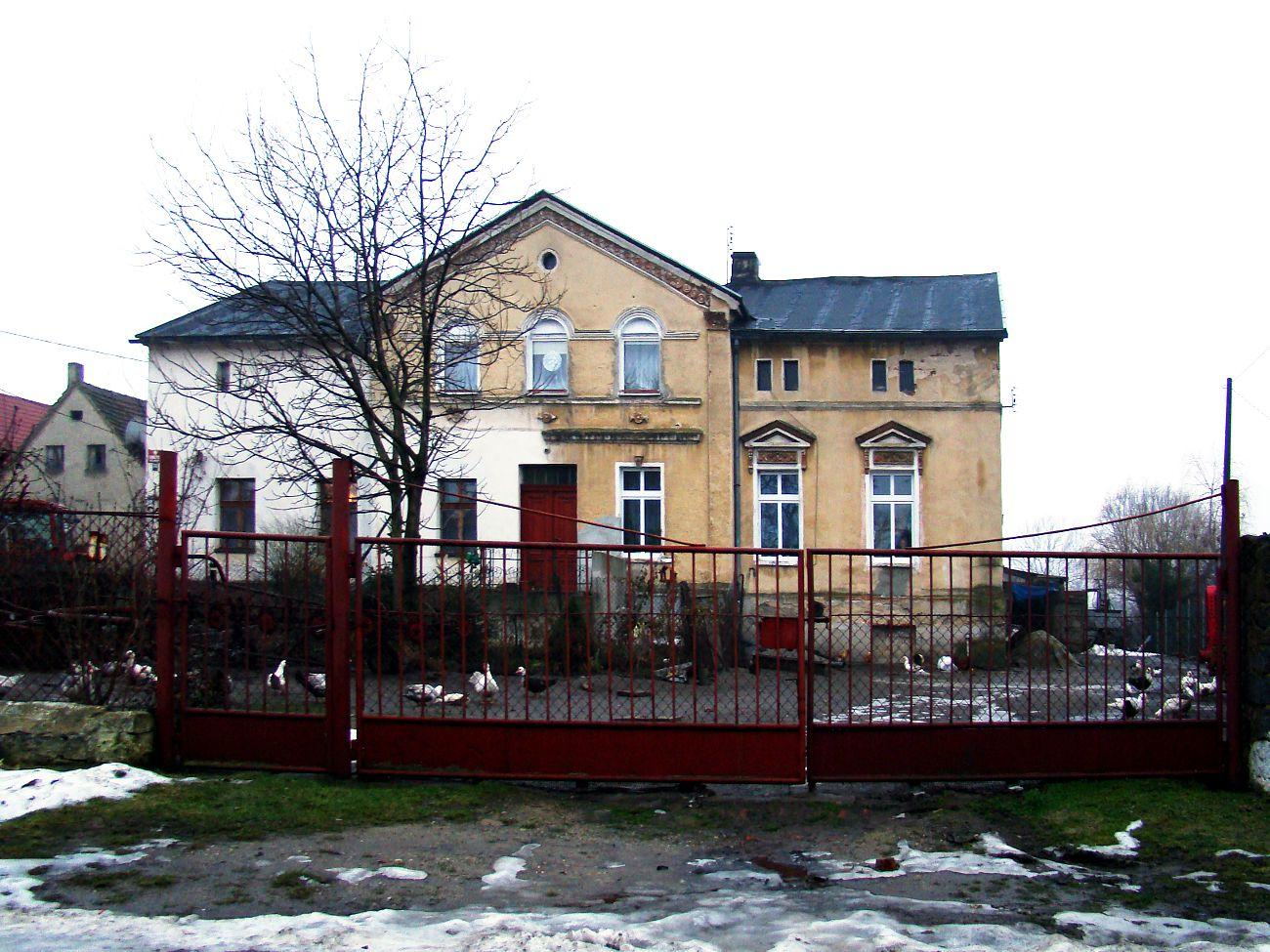

- Location within Poland
- Coordinates: 50°46′N 17°12′E
- Country: Poland
- Voivodeship: Lower Silesian
- County: Strzelin
- Gmina: Wiązów

Księżyce [kɕɛ̃ˈʐɨt͡sɛ] is a village in the administrative district of Gmina Wiązów, within Strzelin County, Lower Silesian Voivodeship, in south-western Poland.

== Administrative division ==
During the years 1975-1998, the town was administratively part of the Wrocław province.
