= Wartenberg =

Wartenberg may refer to:

== Buildings ==
- Wartenberg castles, situated on the Wartenberg hill in the municipality of Muttenz near Basel
- Wartenberg Castle built in the present day Kaiserslautern and destroyed in 1522; former seat of Counts of Wartenberg
- Wartenberg station, an S-Bahn and railway station in the Lichtenberg district of Berlin
- Schloss Wartenberg, German schloss built by Otto Wächter in Krakau

== Places ==
- Wartenberg, Hesse, a municipality in the district Vogelsbergkreis, Hesse, Germany
- Wartenberg, Bavaria, a municipality in the district Erding, Upper Bavaria, Germany
- Wartenberg (Berlin), a locality in the borough of Lichtenberg in Berlin, Germany
- Wartenberg-Rohrbach, a municipality in the Donnersbergkreis district, Rhineland-Palatinate, Germany
- Wartenberg (Swabian Jura), a mountain in Baden-Württemberg, Germany
- Wartenberg am Rollberg, the German name of Stráž pod Ralskem, Czech Republic
- The medieval County of Wartenberg, a fief of the Holy Roman Empire, mediatised to Kingdom of Westphalia in 1806 and subsequently to Prussia in 1814
- Otyń, a town in Poland (German: Deutsch-Wartenberg)
- Syców, a town in Poland (German: Polnisch-Wartenberg until 1888, then Groß-Wartenberg)
- Chełm Dolny, a village in Poland
- Jadowniki Bielskie, a village in Poland
- Parsów, a village in Poland

== People ==
- Franz Wilhelm von Wartenberg (1593-1661), Count, Catholic clergy, Prince-Bishop of Minden, Osnabrück and Verden as well as Vicar Apostolic of the Archdiocese of Bremen
- Ludolf von Wartenberg (born 1941), politician (CDU)
- Robert Wartenberg (1887-1956), neurologist
- Counts of Wartenberg, (since 1802 known as Counts of Wartenberg-Roth) an aristocratic family from Rhenish Hesse, Palatine and Upper Swabia
- Counts of Wartenberg of the Wittelsbach dynasty, aristocratic title given to the descendants of Ferdinand of Bavaria (1550-1608)
- House of Wartenberg, extinct aristocratic family from Bohemia

== Other ==
- Wartenberg wheel, a medical device for neurological use
