= Ośno, Lower Silesian Voivodeship =

Ośno
- Village
- Location within Poland
- Coordinates: 50°50′54″N 17°09′48″E
- Country: Poland
- Voivodeship: Lower Silesian
- County: Strzelin
- Gmina: Wiązów
- Time zone: UTC+1 (CET)
  - Summer (DST): UTC+2 (CEST)
- Vehicle registration: DST

Ośno [ˈɔɕnɔ] is a village in the administrative district of Gmina Wiązów, within Strzelin County, Lower Silesian Voivodeship, in south-western Poland.
