= Zborowice, Lower Silesian Voivodeship =

Zborowice
- Village
- Location within Poland
- Coordinates: 50°48′N 17°11′E
- Country: Poland
- Voivodeship: Lower Silesian
- County: Strzelin
- Gmina: Wiązów

Zborowice [zbɔrɔˈvit͡sɛ] is a village in the administrative district of Gmina Wiązów, within Strzelin County, Lower Silesian Voivodeship, in south-western Poland.
