= Fabian Steinheil =

Russian general (1762–1831)

Graf Fabian Gotthard von Steinheil
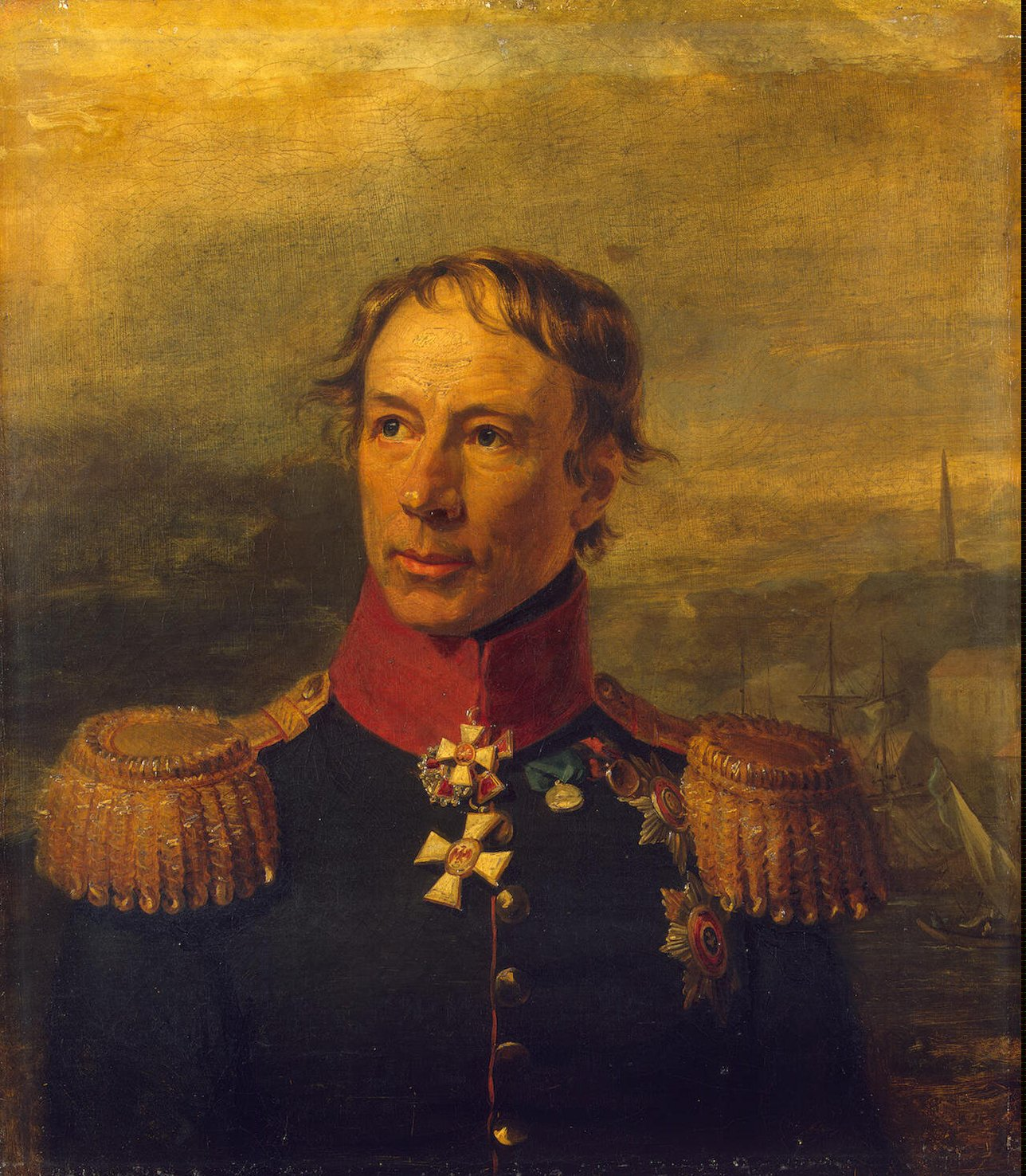
- Portrait by George Dawe, 1820–1825
- Born: 14 October 1762; Hapsal, Reval Governorate, Russian Empire
- Died: 7 March 1831 (aged 68); Helsinki, Grand Duchy of Finland, Russian Empire
- Other name: Faddey Fyodorovich Steinheil
- Military career
- Allegiance: Russia
- Branch: Imperial Russian Army
- Rank: General
- Conflicts: Russo-Swedish War (1788–1790); Napoleonic Wars

Fabian Gotthard von Steinheil (Russian: Фаддей Фёдорович Штейнгель, romanized: Faddey Fyodorovich Shteyngel; 14 October 1762 – 7 March 1831) was a Russian general and politician of Baltic German descent. He served as the governor-general of Finland from 1810 to 1824.

== Biography ==
=== Family ===
Steinheil was born on 14 October 1762, in Hapsal, in Reval Governorate. His parents were Friedrich Jacob Steinheil and Christina Wilhelmine von Tiesenhausen. His father's family was from the region of Upper Rhine in Germany (where they had been burghers and officials of their hometowns); and his mother was from a cadet branch of the ancient Baltic Tiesenhausen noble family, daughter of nobleman Frommhold Fabian Tiesenhausen, lord of Orina in Estonia. Stenheil's uncle and father had received a baronial title from the imperial authorities.

He married Nathalia von Engelhardt in 1793.

=== Military career ===
Fabian von Steinheil became a lieutenant in the Imperial Russian Army in 1782. He took part in the war in Finland in 1788–1790 and was promoted to lieutenant colonel. Afterwards he turned to topographical work, leading fortification construction projects in Old Finland. Between 1793 and 1795 he oversaw improvements to the fortresses at Hamina, Taavetti and Lappeenranta, and produced cartographic surveys of the region. During this period he became acquainted with many of the local administrative officials, several of whom he would later appoint to his chancellery as Governor-General.

He became a major general in 1798 and took part in the campaigns in Prussia in 1806–1807 and Poland in 1805–1807, distinguishing himself in East Prussia in the fighting against the French and being promoted to lieutenant general in 1807. During the Finnish War of 1808–1809, he commanded the Russian infantry and naval forces sent to Åland. In 1812, he was defeated at Mesoten, but fought under General Wittgenstein at Polotsk. From September 1812 to the spring of 1813, he took part in the war against Napoleon as commander of forces in Courland and Livonia.

=== Governor-General of Finland ===
In 1810, he was appointed as the governor-general of Finland and the commander-in-chief of Russian forces there. During his first years in office, the administration of the Grand Duchy of Finland was stabilised. The regeringskonsel (Government Council), renamed the Senate in 1816, established its dominant position within Finnish central administration.

As a Swedish speaker, Steinheil participated regularly in Senate sessions and maintained better relations with Finnish officials than his successors, who did not know Swedish. He was made a count in 1812. In 1819, he was promoted to full general.

His relationship with the Committee for Finnish Affairs in Saint Petersburg was more difficult. Steinheil failed to see the purpose of the committee and regarded it as an interference in his work. The committee's chairman, Gustaf Mauritz Armfelt, in turn had little regard for the Senate and believed it obstructed reform, forcing Steinheil into the role of defending the Senate against the committee. Tensions eased after the two men met on several occasions, and dissipated with Armfelt's death in 1813.

Armfelt's successor as secretary of state, Robert Henrik Rehbinder, shared his low opinion of Steinheil, considering him dispensable only because a worse successor might replace him. Finnish officials also questioned his authority; Carl Johan Walleen wrote in 1812: "The Governor-General's power need not be mentioned, for in reality it does not exist." As the committee increasingly encroached on his and the Senate's administrative domain, Steinheil responded from 1817 with repeated requests to resign, none of which were granted.

When Steinheil renewed his resignation request in autumn 1823 it was accepted. He remained in post until spring 1824, when he handed over to his successor Arseny Zakrevsky.

=== Later life ===
After leaving office, Steinheil remained in Finland. He devoted himself to mineralogical research and to painting and drawing at Mejlans estate (Finnish: Meilahden kartano) in Helsinki, which he had purchased in 1823. He died there on 7 March 1831.

== Honours and awards ==
- Knight of the Order of St. Alexander Nevsky;
- Order of Saint Anna, 1st class;
- Order of St. Vladimir, 2nd class;
- Gold Sword for Bravery;
- Order of St. George, 3rd class;
- Order of St. George, 4th class;
- Order of the Red Eagle, 1st class;
- Honorary Member of the Russian Academy of Sciences.

Political offices
Preceded by Gustaf Mauritz Armfelt	Governor-General of Finland; 1810–1824	Succeeded by Arseny Zakrevsky
