= Janowo, Lower Silesian Voivodeship =

Janowo
- Village
- Location within Poland
- Coordinates: 50°48′07″N 17°13′52″E
- Country: Poland
- Voivodeship: Lower Silesian
- County: Strzelin
- Gmina: Wiązów

Janowo [jaˈnɔvɔ] is a village in the administrative district of Gmina Wiązów, within Strzelin County, Lower Silesian Voivodeship, in south-western Poland.
