= Stary Wiązów =

- Village
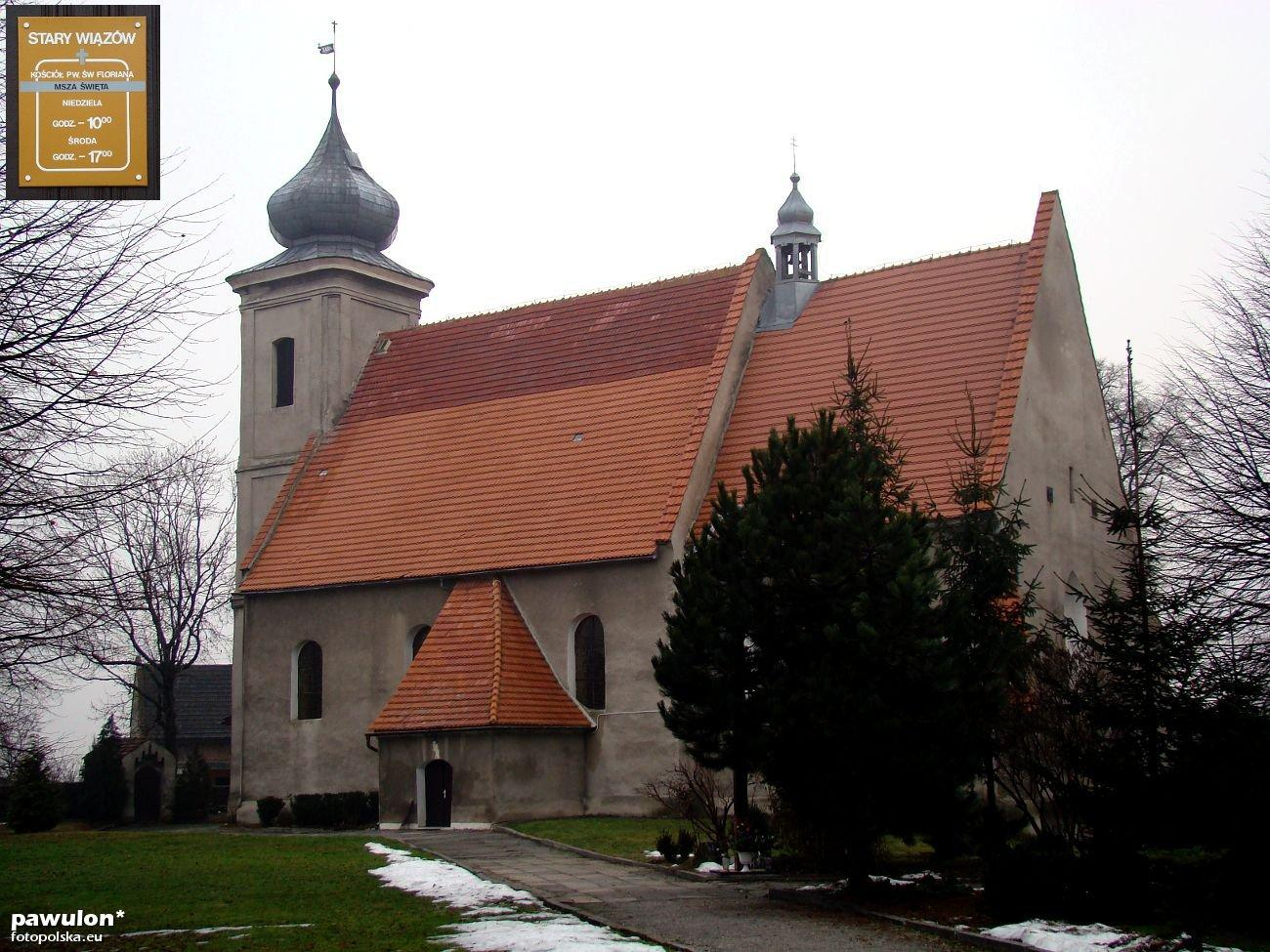
- Catholic church

- Location within Poland
- Coordinates: 50°48′15″N 17°11′48″E
- Country: Poland
- Voivodeship: Lower Silesian
- County: Strzelin
- Gmina: Wiązów

Stary Wiązów [ˈstarɨ ˈvjɔ̃zuf] is a village in the administrative district of Gmina Wiązów, within Strzelin County, Lower Silesian Voivodeship, in south-western Poland.
