= Peter Yorck von Wartenburg =

German jurist (1904–1944)

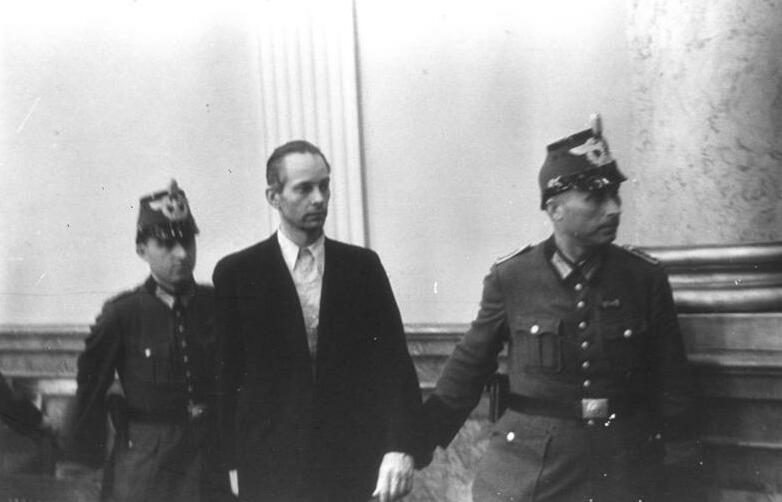
Yorck von Wartenburg at the Volksgerichtshof

Peter Graf Yorck von Wartenburg (13 November 1904 – 8 August 1944) was a German jurist and a member of the German Resistance against Nazism. He studied law and politics in Bonn and Breslau from 1923 to 1926, gaining his doctorate in Breslau in 1927 and passing the civil service entrance examination for lawyers in Berlin in 1930. He married Marion Winter that same year.

== Career ==
Yorck was born in Klein Öls, Landkreis Ohlau, Silesia, Prussia.

After working as a lawyer, a legal consultant for the Osthilfe government program reducing agricultural debt in East Prussia, and for the municipal government in Breslau, Yorck served on the Reich Price Commission in Berlin from 1936 to 1941 as the department head responsible for fundamental issues. He refused to join the NSDAP and was thus no longer promoted from 1938 on. He first became involved in the resistance in 1938, working in close collaboration with his friends Fritz-Dietlof Graf von der Schulenburg and Ulrich-Wilhelm Graf von Schwerin von Schwanenfeld. After the Kristallnacht pogroms of 9–10 November 1938, he set up a discussion group on the principles of a new Reich constitution.

He was called up as a reserve officer on the outbreak of war, transferring to an administrative post (Wirtschaftsstab Ost) assigned to the Armed Forces High Command in Berlin in 1942. In January 1940, he began to work closely with Helmuth James Graf von Moltke, with whom he initiated and led the discussions of the Kreisau Circle, which met very often at Yorck’s home in Berlin-Lichterfelde. Yorck, who took part in all three of the circle’s conferences in Kreisau, supported a coup attempt to be launched with an assassination, unlike his friend Moltke.

When Claus Schenk Graf von Stauffenberg began to speed up preparations for the coup in Berlin in September 1943, he and Yorck came into close contact. Designated as an undersecretary of state for a future Reich Chancellor, Yorck remained in the innermost circle of the conspirators until the very end. After the failed coup attempt, Yorck was arrested in the Bendlerblock in Berlin in the late evening of 20 July 1944, sentenced to death by the People’s Court on 8 August 1944, and executed the same day in Berlin-Plötzensee.

== Quotes ==
"Dearly beloved child of my heart, we are probably standing at the end of our beautiful and rich life together. Because tomorrow the People's Court intends to stand in judgment on me and others. I hear that we have been expelled from the army. They can take the uniform from us, but not the spirit in which we acted. And in that I feel united with our fathers and brothers and comrades. The fact that ordained what has happened is part of his fathomless decrees, which I humbly accept. I believe myself to be pure in heart, yet driven by the feeling of guilt that weighs on all of us. I therefore confidently hope that I find a merciful judge in God."

== See also ==
- List of members of the 20 July plot
