= Kobiela =

Kobiela may refer to:

- Kobiela, Opole Voivodeship (south-west Poland)
- Kobiela, Świętokrzyskie Voivodeship (south-central Poland)
- Kobiela, Warmian-Masurian Voivodeship (north Poland)
- Kobiela (surname)
