= Wierzbna =

Wierzbna may refer to the following places in Poland:

- Wierzbna, Lower Silesian Voivodeship (south-west Poland)
- Wierzbna, Subcarpathian Voivodeship (south-east Poland)
- Wierzbna, Opole Voivodeship (south-west Poland)
