= Bąków =

Bąków may refer to the following places in Poland:

- Bąków, Oleśnica County in Lower Silesian Voivodeship (south-west Poland)
- Bąków, Wrocław County in Lower Silesian Voivodeship (south-west Poland)
- Bąków, Silesian Voivodeship (south Poland)
- Bąków, Subcarpathian Voivodeship (south-east Poland)
- Bąków, Przysucha County in Masovian Voivodeship (east-central Poland)
- Bąków, Szydłowiec County in Masovian Voivodeship (east-central Poland)
- Bąków, Brzeg County in Opole Voivodeship (south-west Poland)
- Bąków, Kluczbork County in Opole Voivodeship (south-west Poland)
