= Zarow (disambiguation) =

Zarow is a river in Western Pomerania, Mecklenburg-Vorpommern, Germany.

Zarow may also refer to:

- Żarów, Lower Silesian Voivodeship (south-western Poland)
- Żarów, Opole Voivodeship (south-western Poland)
