= Wójtowice =

Wójtowice may refer to the following places in Poland:

- Wójtowice, Lower Silesian Voivodeship (south-west Poland)
- Wójtowice, Opole Voivodeship (south-west Poland)
