= Jędrzejów (disambiguation) =

Jędrzejów is a town in the Świętokrzyskie Voivodeship, south-central Poland.

Jędrzejów may refer also refer to places:

- Jędrzejów, Opole Voivodeship (south-west Poland)
- Jędrzejów, Ostrowiec County in Świętokrzyskie Voivodeship (south-central Poland)
