= Lubcz =

Lubcz may refer to:

- Lubcz, Belarus, also known as Lyubcha, an urban-type settlement in Grodno Region, Belarus
- Lubcz, Opole Voivodeship, a village in Opole Voivodeship, Poland
- Lubcz, Kuyavian-Pomeranian Voivodeship, a village in Kuyavian-Pomeranian Voivodeship, Poland
