= Zielonkowice =

- Village
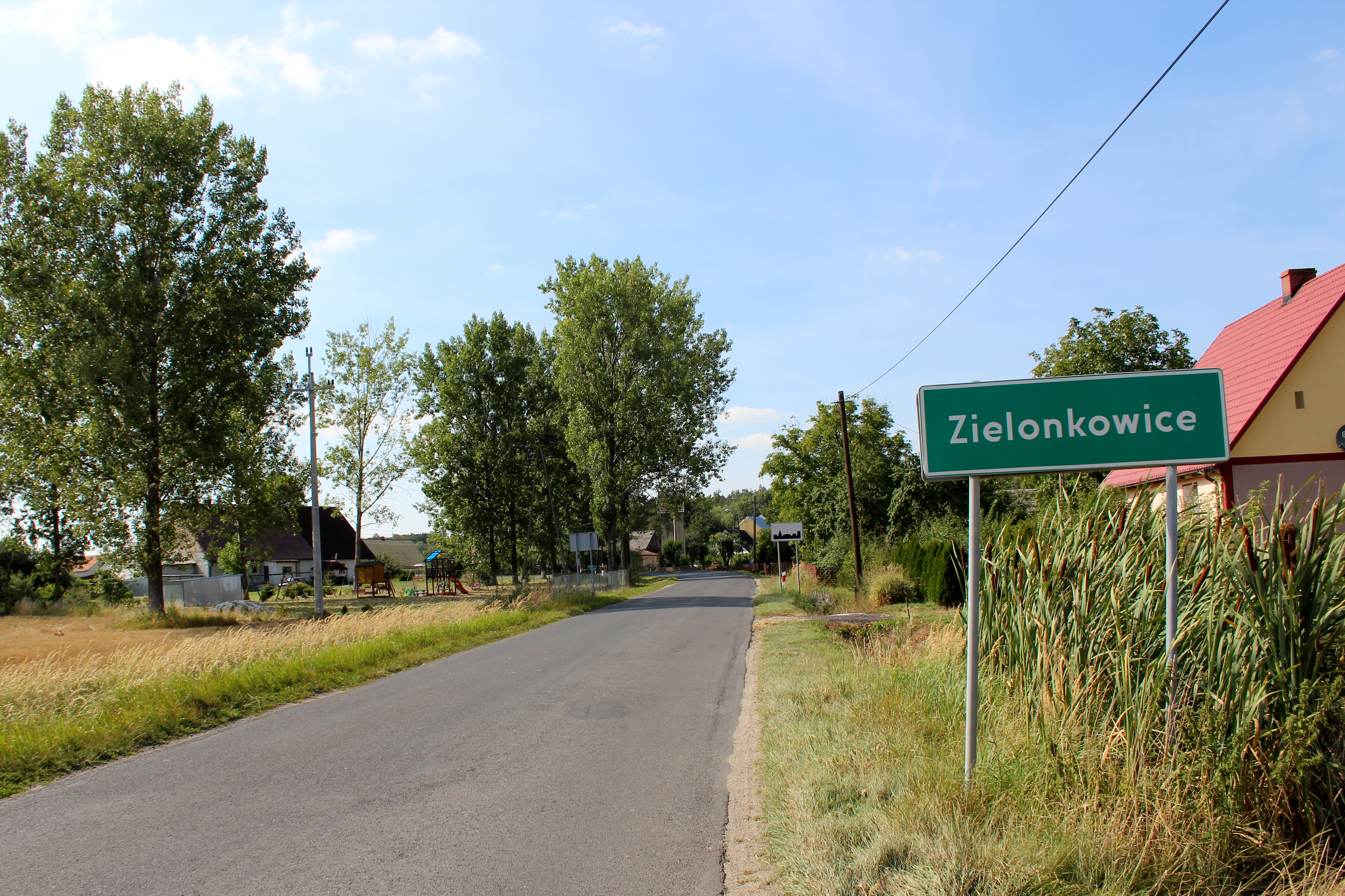

- Location within Poland
- Coordinates: 50°43′38″N 17°16′6″E
- Country: Poland
- Voivodeship: Opole
- County: Brzeg
- Gmina: Grodków

Zielonkowice [ʑɛlɔnkɔˈvit͡sɛ] is a village in the administrative district of Gmina Grodków, within Brzeg County, Opole Voivodeship, in south-western Poland.
