= Głębocko, Opole Voivodeship =

Głębocko
- Village
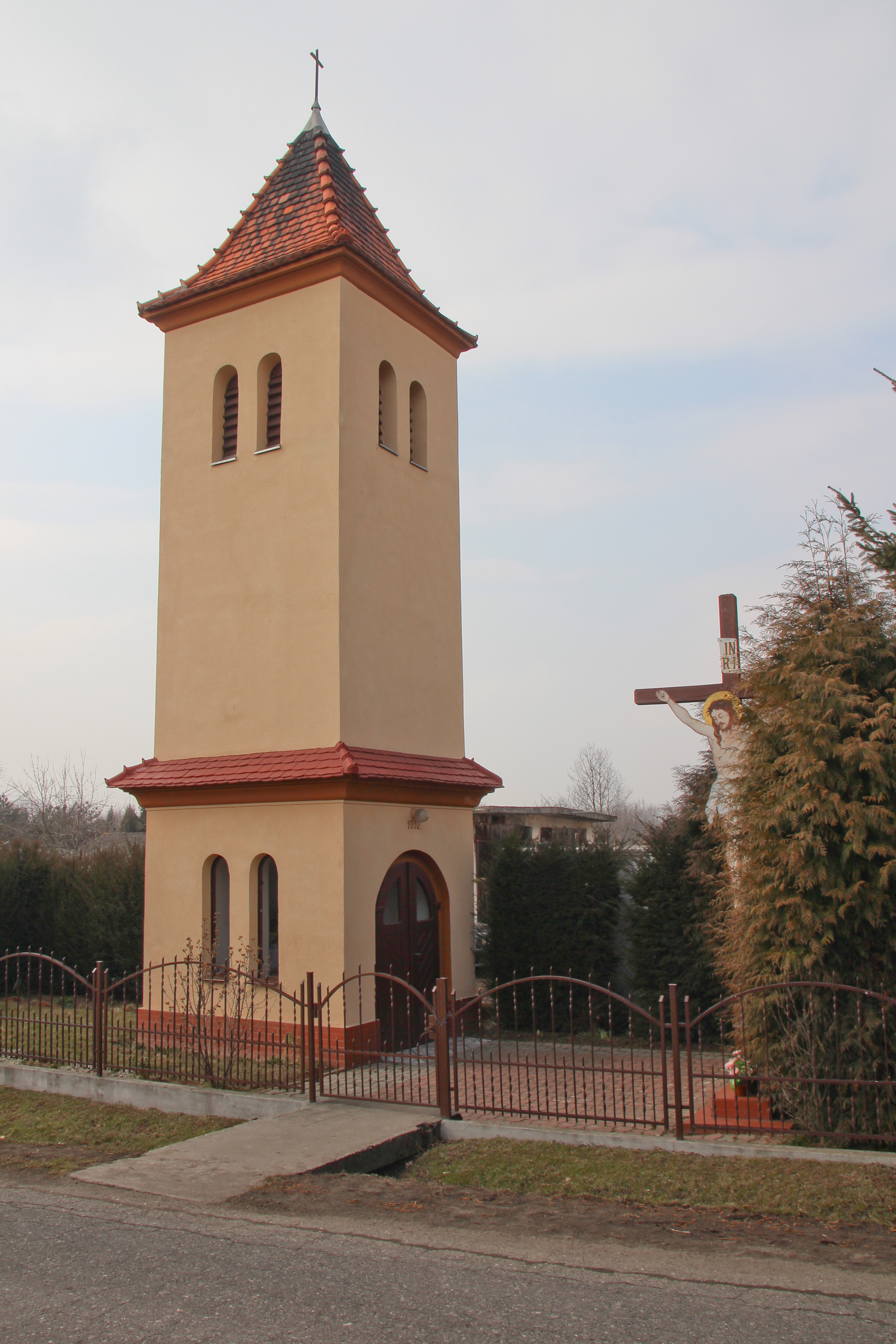
- Chapel in Głębocko

- Location within Poland
- Coordinates: 50°41′12″N 17°29′21″E
- Country: Poland
- Voivodeship: Opole
- County: Brzeg
- Gmina: Grodków

Głębocko [ɡwɛmˈbɔt͡skɔ] is a village in the administrative district of Gmina Grodków, within Brzeg County, Opole Voivodeship, in south-western Poland.
