= Gmina Grodków =

Gmina Grodków Grodków Commune
- Gmina
- Flag Coat of arms
- Interactive map of Gmina Grodków
- Coordinates (Grodków): 50°41′N 17°22′E
- Country: Poland
- Voivodeship: Opole
- County: Brzeg
- Seat: Grodków

Area
  - Total: 286.39 km^{2} (110.58 sq mi)

Population (2019-06-30)
  - Total: 19,149
  - Density: 66.863/km^{2} (173.18/sq mi)
  - Urban: 8,595
  - Rural: 10,554
- Website: http://www.grodkow.pl/

Gmina Grodków is an urban-rural gmina (administrative district) in Brzeg County, Opole Voivodeship, in south-western Poland. Its seat is the town of Grodków, which lies approximately 22 kilometres (14 mi) south of Brzeg and 41 km (25 mi) west of the regional capital Opole.

The gmina covers an area of 286.39 square kilometres (110.6 sq mi), and as of 2019 its total population is 19,149.

== Villages ==
Apart from the town of Grodków, Gmina Grodków contains the villages and settlements of Bąków, Bogdanów, Gałązczyce, Gierów, Głębocko, Gnojna, Gola Grodkowska, Jaszów, Jędrzejów, Jeszkotle, Kobiela, Kolnica, Kopice, Lipowa, Lubcz, Mikołajowa, Młodoszowice, Nowa Wieś Mała, Osiek Grodkowski, Polana, Przylesie Dolne, Rogów, Starowice, Strzegów, Sulisław, Tarnów Grodkowski, Więcmierzyce, Wierzbna, Wierzbnik, Wojnowiczki, Wojsław, Wójtowice, Żarów, Żelazna and Zielonkowice.

== Neighbouring gminas ==
Gmina Grodków is bordered by the gminas of Kamiennik, Niemodlin, Olszanka, Pakosławice, Przeworno, Skoroszyce and Wiązów.

== Twin towns – sister cities ==
Gmina Grodków is twinned with:

- Beckum, Germany
- Borshchiv, Ukraine
