= Kolnica, Opole Voivodeship =

Kolnica
- Village
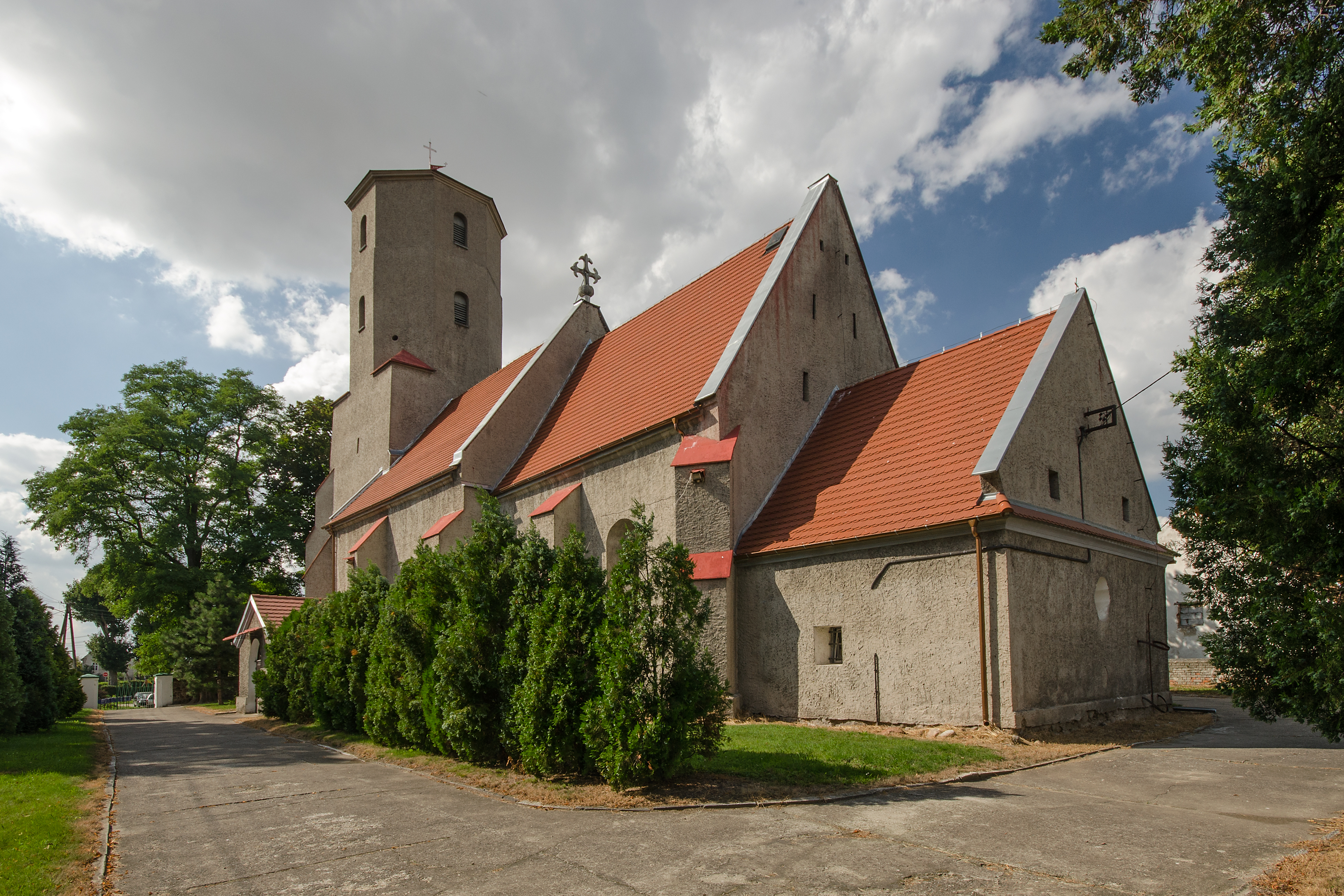
- Catholic church

- Location within Poland
- Coordinates: 50°45′3″N 17°20′31″E
- Country: Poland
- Voivodeship: Opole
- County: Brzeg
- Gmina: Grodków
- Elevation: 160 m (520 ft)
- Population (approx.): 1,000
- Website: http://www.kolnica.lua.pl

Kolnica [kɔlˈnit͡sa] is a village in the administrative district of Gmina Grodków, within Brzeg County, Opole Voivodeship, in south-western Poland.
