= Strzegów, Opole Voivodeship =

Strzegów
- Village
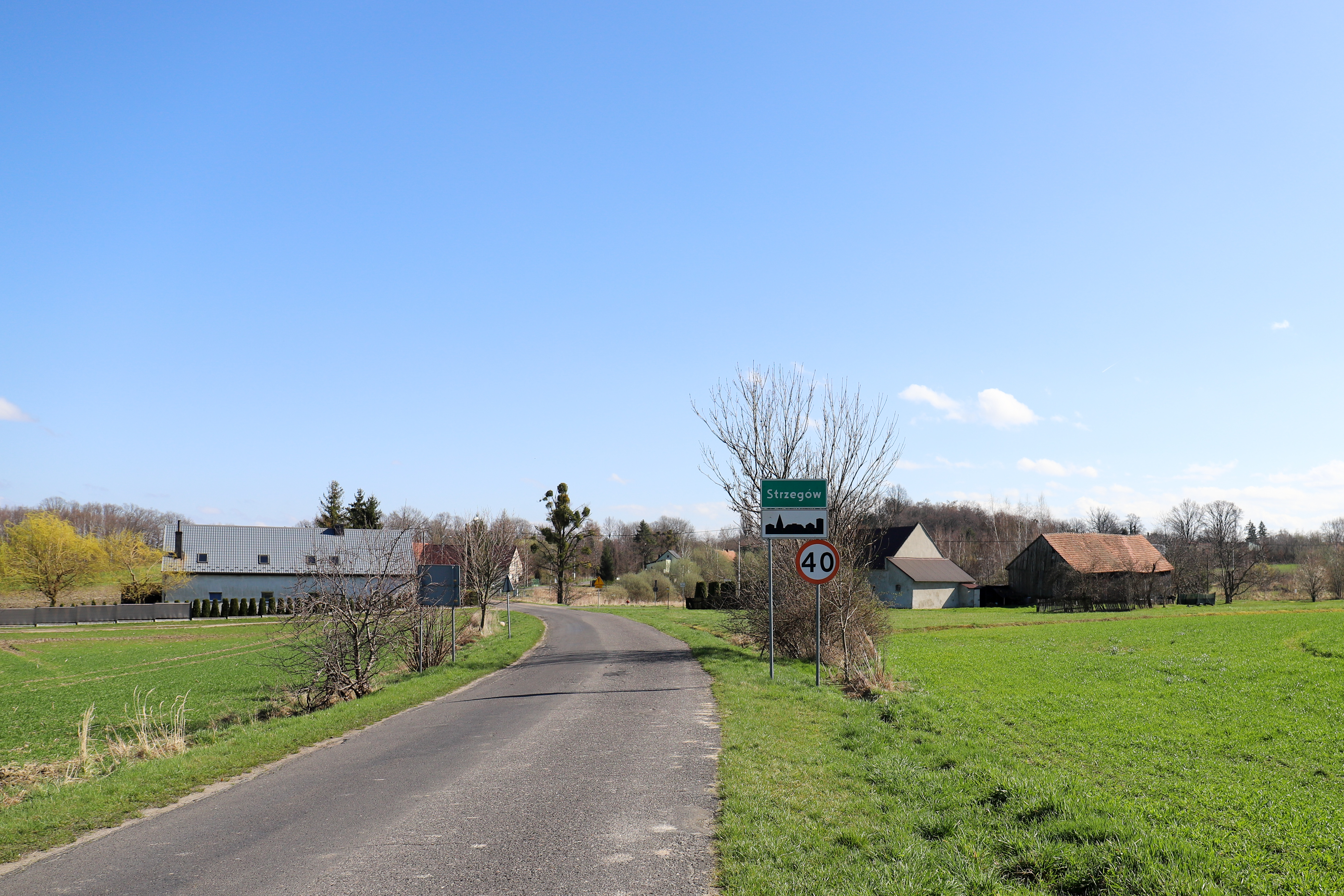

- Location within Poland
- Coordinates: 50°38′23″N 17°16′55″E
- Country: Poland
- Voivodeship: Opole
- County: Brzeg
- Gmina: Grodków
- Time zone: UTC+1 (CET)
  - Summer (DST): UTC+2 (CEST)
- Vehicle registration: OB

Strzegów [ˈstʂɛɡuf] is a village in the administrative district of Gmina Grodków, within Brzeg County, Opole Voivodeship, in south-western Poland.
