= Sulisław, Opole Voivodeship =

Sulisław
- Village
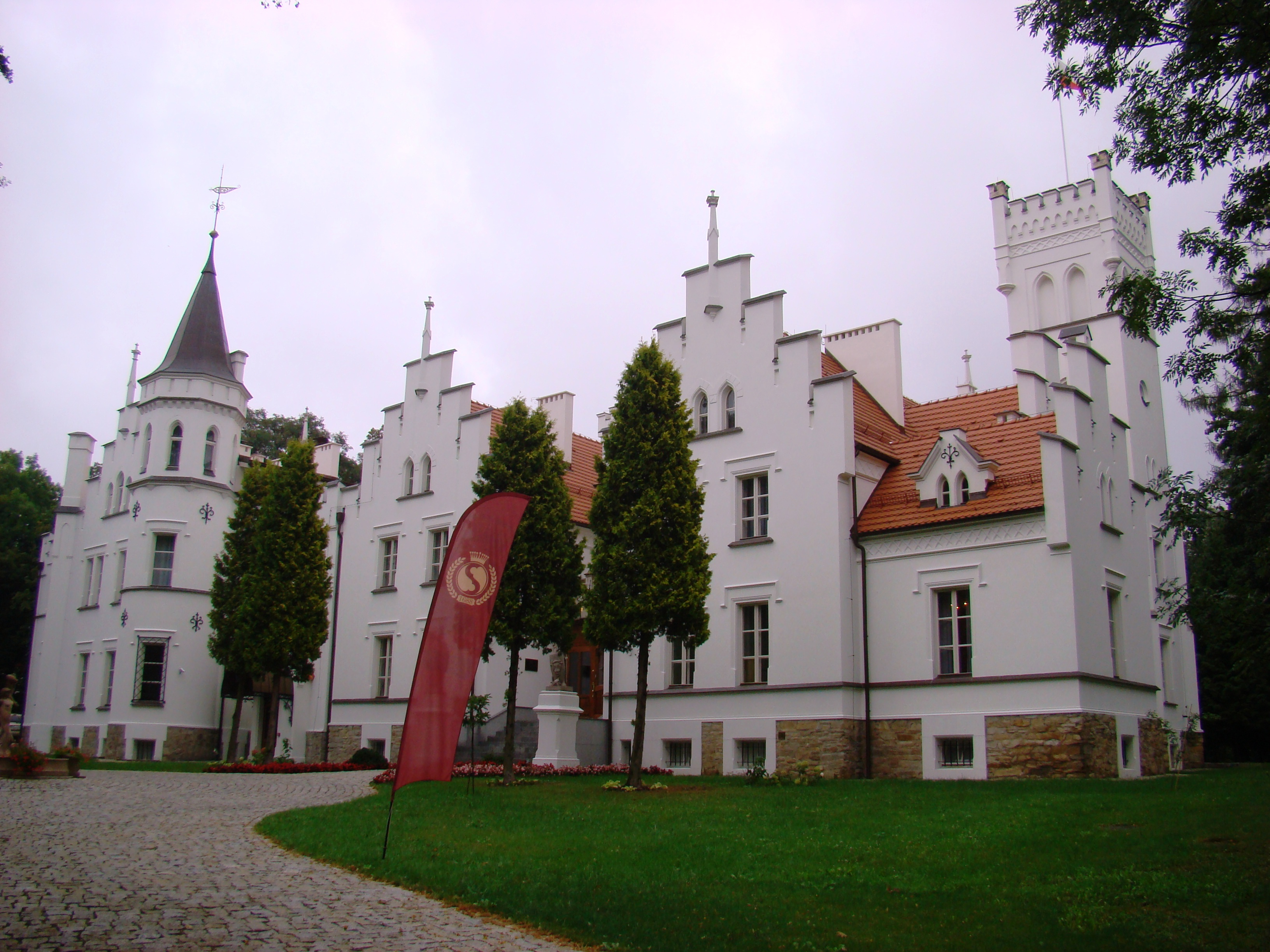
- Sulisław Palace, 19th century.

- Location within Poland
- Coordinates: 50°41′32″N 17°18′16″E
- Country: Poland
- Voivodeship: Opole
- County: Brzeg
- Gmina: Grodków

Sulisław [suˈliswaf] (German Zülzhof) is a village in the administrative district of Gmina Grodków, within Brzeg County, Opole Voivodeship, in south-western Poland.
