= Gnojna =

- Village
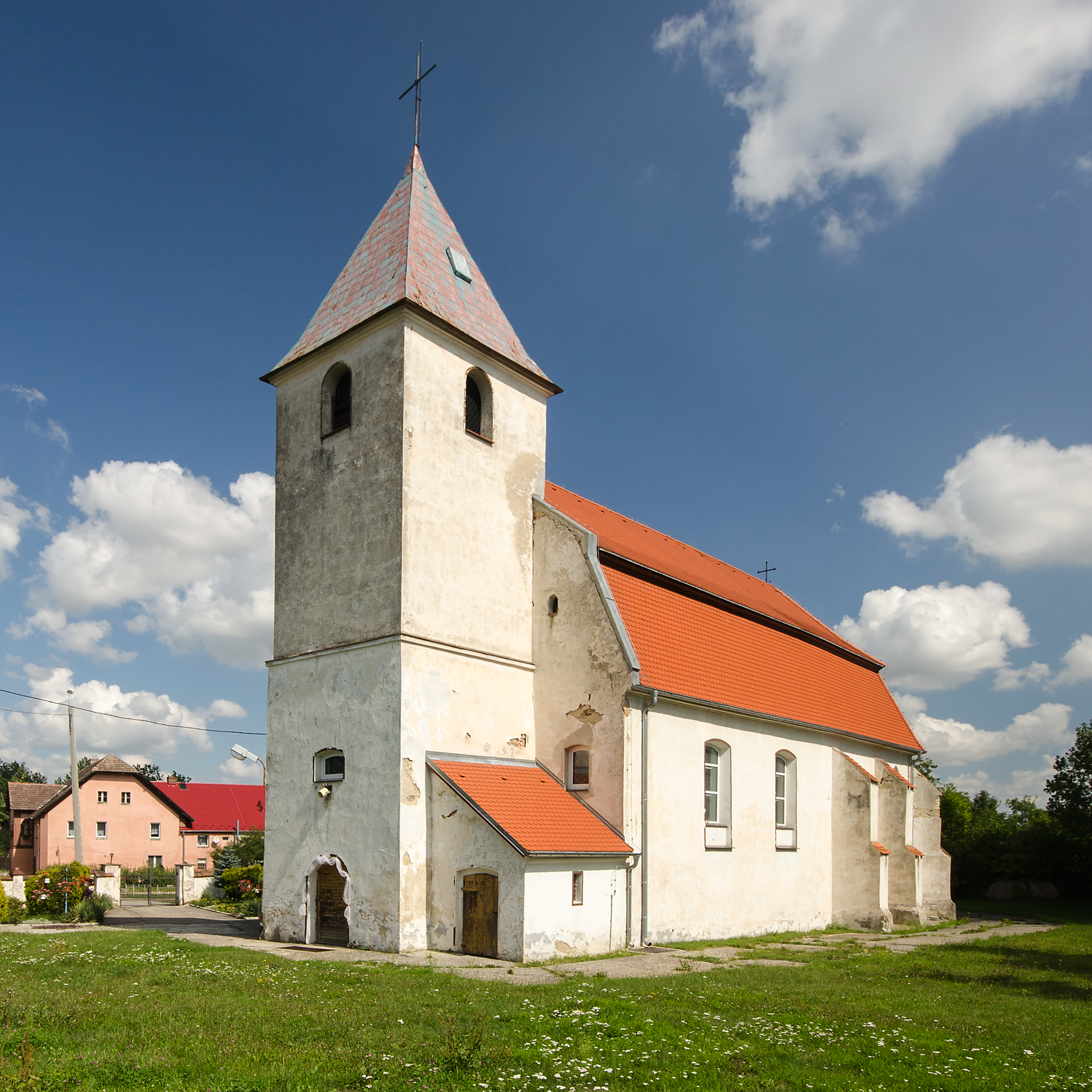
- Our Lady of the Rosary church in Gnojna

- Location within Poland
- Coordinates: 50°43′18″N 17°17′36″E
- Country: Poland
- Voivodeship: Opole
- County: Brzeg
- Gmina: Grodków
- Population: 570
- Time zone: UTC+1 (CET)
  - Summer (DST): UTC+2 (CEST)
- Vehicle registration: OB

Gnojna [ˈɡnɔi̯na] is a village in the administrative district of Gmina Grodków, within Brzeg County, Opole Voivodeship, in south-western Poland.

== History ==
In the Middle Ages the settlement was part of Piast-ruled Poland, and afterwards it was also part of Bohemia (Czechia), Prussia and Germany. During World War II, the Germans established and operated the E597 forced labour subcamp of the Stalag VIII-B/344 prisoner-of-war camp in the village. The village was restored to Poland after the defeat of Nazi Germany in World War II in 1945.
