= Lipowa, Brzeg County =

Lipowa
- Village
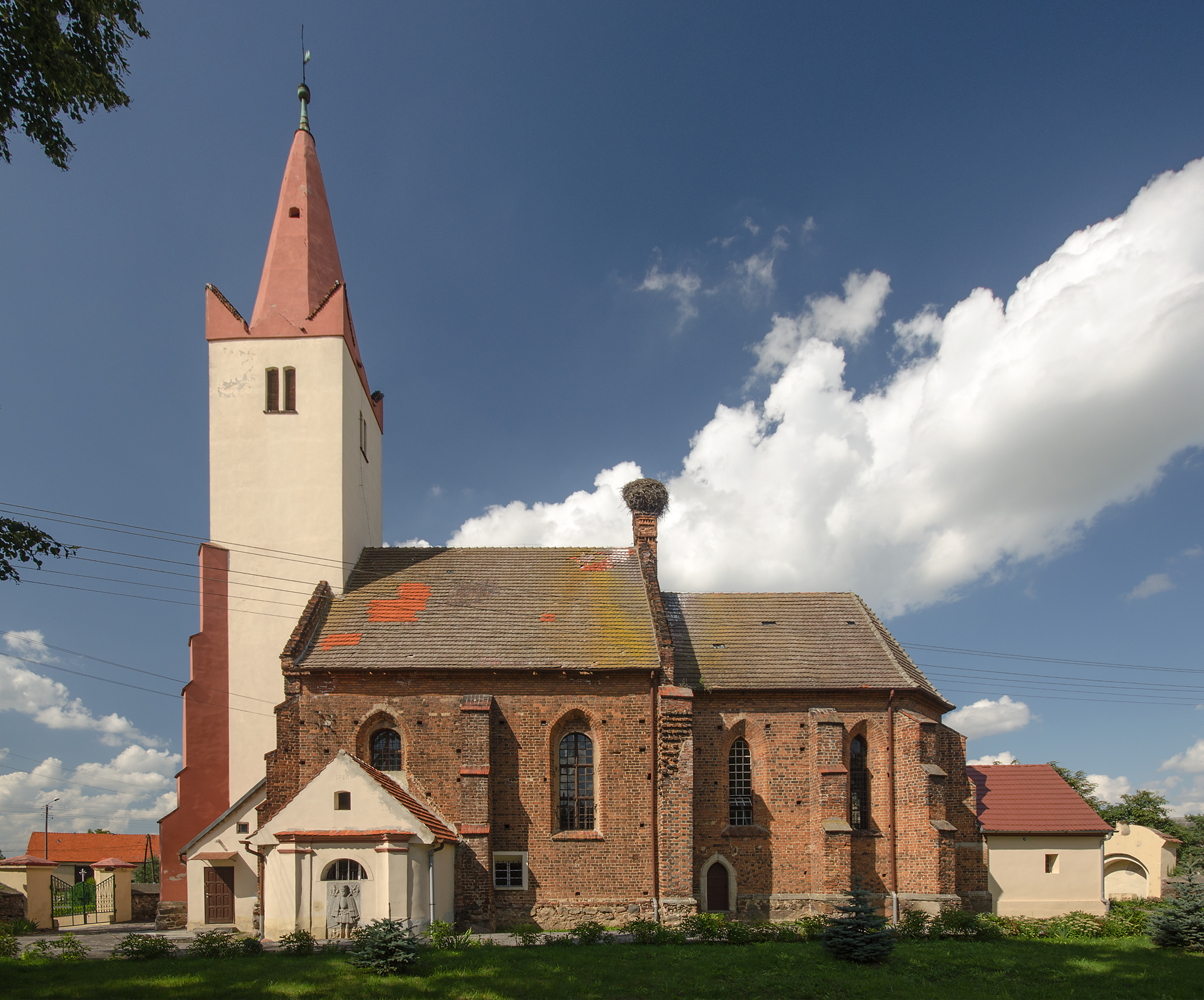
- St. Martin's Church

- Location within Poland
- Coordinates: 50°43′42″N 17°26′6″E
- Country: Poland
- Voivodeship: Opole
- County: Brzeg
- Gmina: Grodków

Lipowa [liˈpɔva] is a village in the administrative district of Gmina Grodków, within Brzeg County, Opole Voivodeship, in south-western Poland.

The village is served by Lipowa Śląska railway station, situated on the Brzeg - Nysa railway line (288).
