= Rogów, Opole Voivodeship =

Rogów
- Village
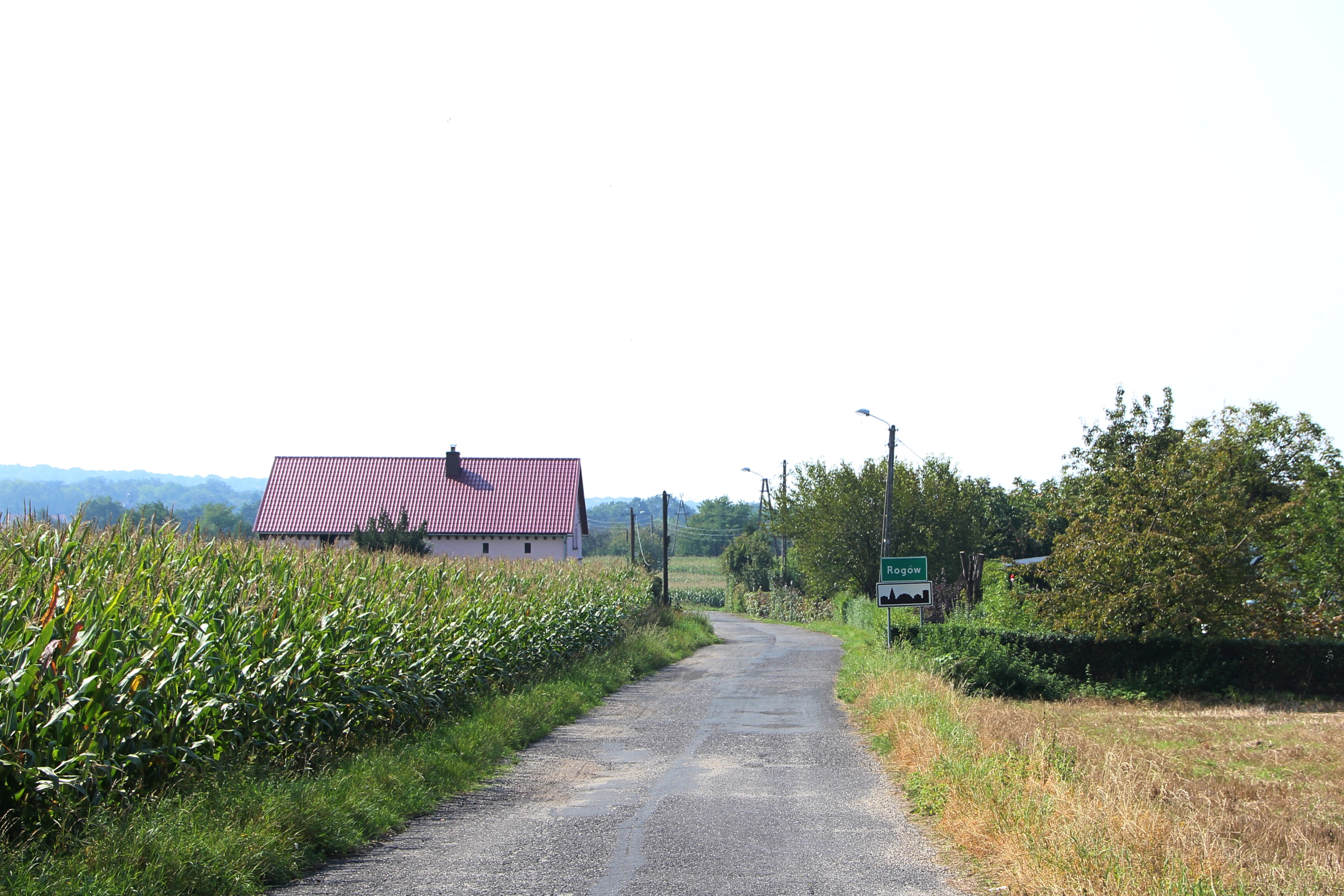

- Location within Poland
- Coordinates: 50°38′03″N 17°14′18″E
- Country: Poland
- Voivodeship: Opole
- County: Brzeg
- Gmina: Grodków

Rogów [ˈrɔɡuf] (German Rogau) is a village in the administrative district of Gmina Grodków, within Brzeg County, Opole Voivodeship, in south-western Poland.
