= Więcmierzyce =

- Village
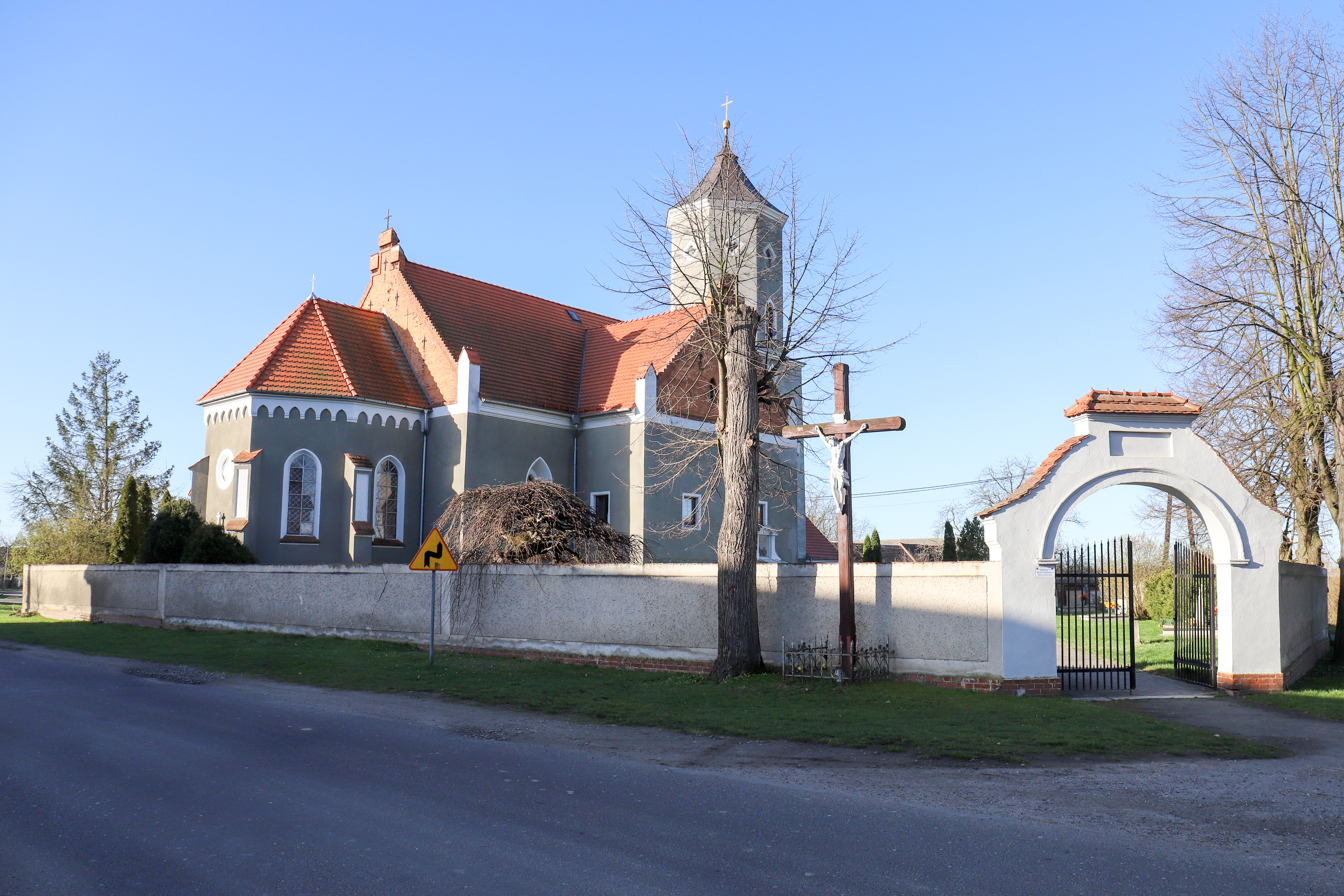
- Church of Saint Bartholomew

- Location within Poland
- Coordinates: 50°37′22″N 17°27′12″E
- Country: Poland
- Voivodeship: Opole
- County: Brzeg
- Gmina: Grodków

Więcmierzyce [vjɛnt͡smjɛˈʐɨt͡sɛ] (German: Winzenberg) is a village in the administrative district of Gmina Grodków, within Brzeg County, Opole Voivodeship, in south-western Poland.
