= Wojsław =

- Village
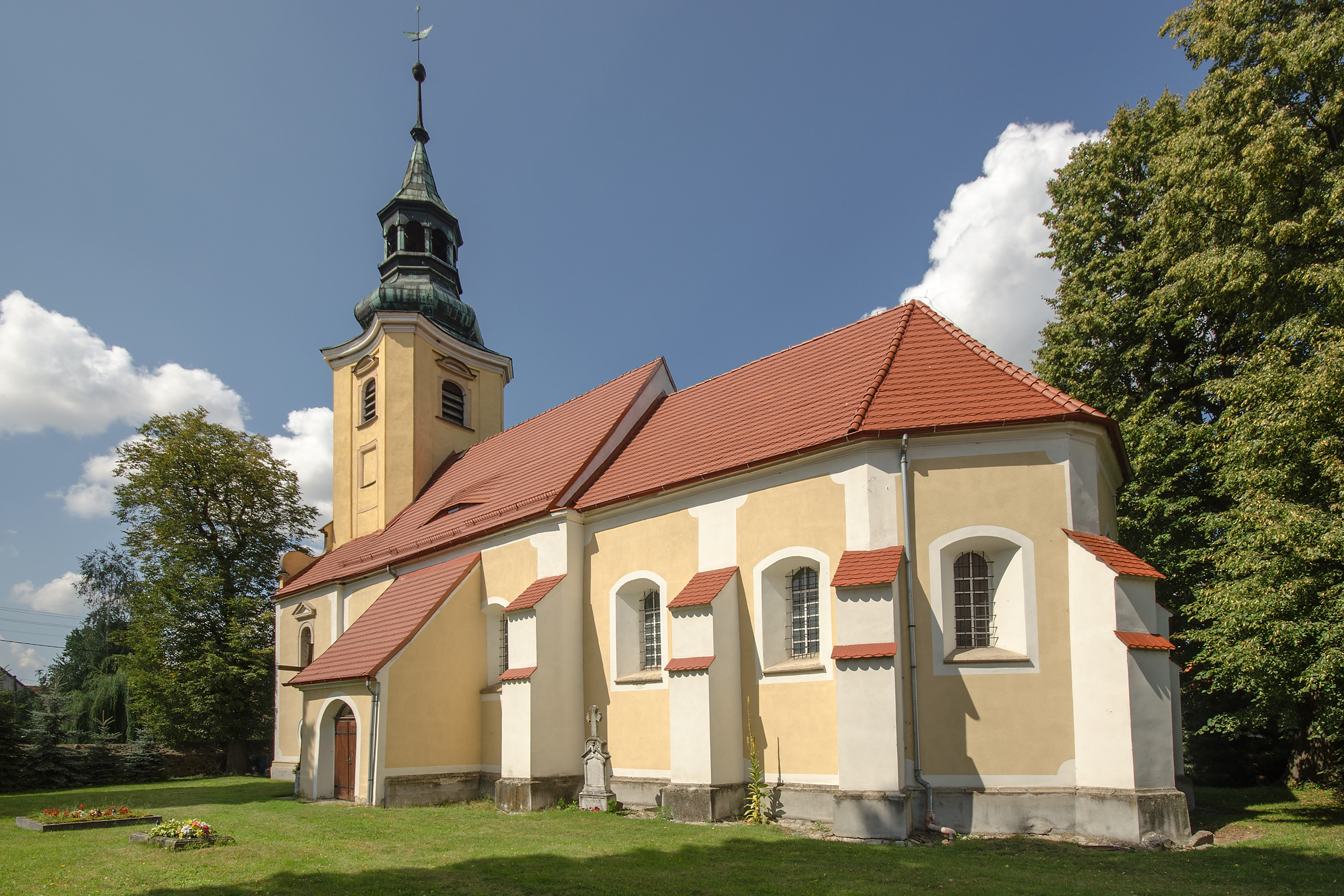
- Catholic church

- Location within Poland
- Coordinates: 50°43′31″N 17°21′32″E
- Country: Poland
- Voivodeship: Opole
- County: Brzeg
- Gmina: Grodków
- Population (approx.): 320

Wojsław [ˈvɔi̯swaf] is a village in the administrative district of Gmina Grodków, within Brzeg County, Opole Voivodeship, in south-western Poland.
