= Polana, Opole Voivodeship =

Polana
- Village
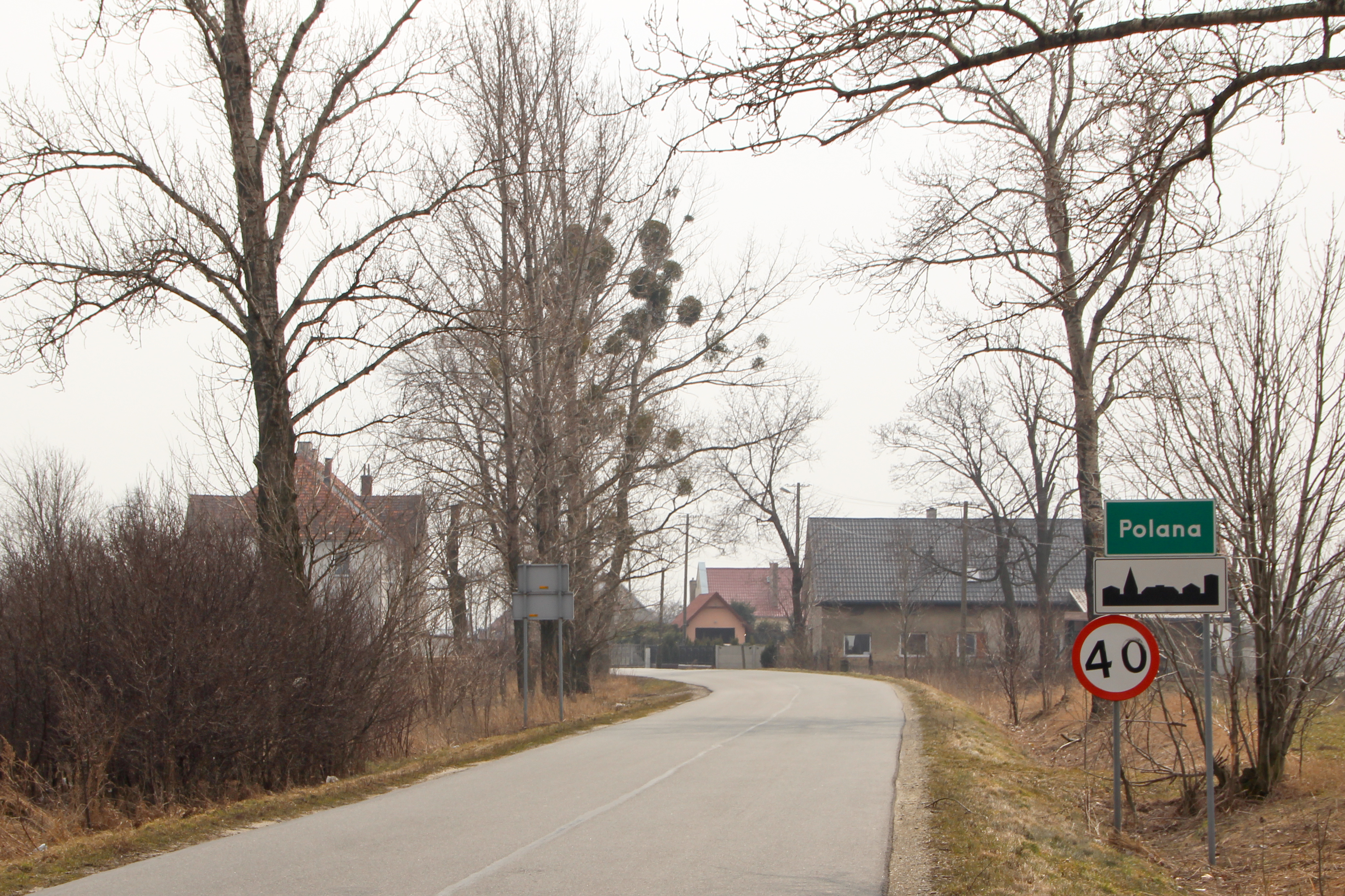

- Location within Poland
- Coordinates: 50°43′30″N 17°22′53″E
- Country: Poland
- Voivodeship: Opole
- County: Brzeg
- Gmina: Grodków

Polana [pɔˈlana] is a village in the administrative district of Gmina Grodków, within Brzeg County, Opole Voivodeship, in south-western Poland.
