= Gałązczyce =

- Village
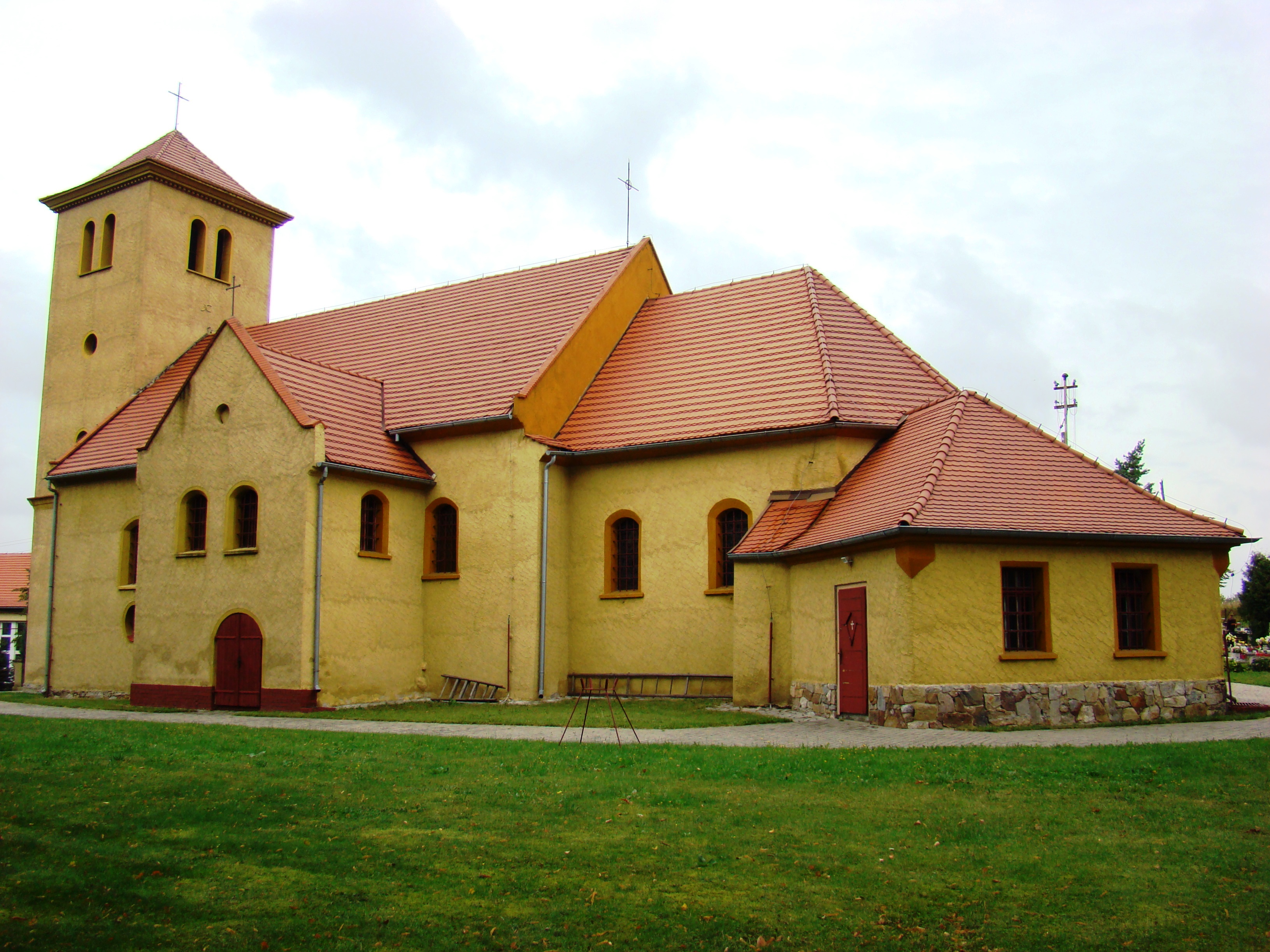
- St. Mary's and St. Martin's Church

- Location within Poland
- Coordinates: 50°36′46″N 17°15′38″E
- Country: Poland
- Voivodeship: Opole
- County: Brzeg
- Gmina: Grodków
- Highest elevation: 220 m (720 ft)
- Lowest elevation: 200 m (660 ft)
- Population: 370

Gałązczyce [ɡawɔ̃sˈt͡ʂɨt͡sɛ] is a village in the administrative district of Gmina Grodków, within Brzeg County, Opole Voivodeship, in south-western Poland.
