= Wierzbnik, Opole Voivodeship =

Wierzbnik
- Village
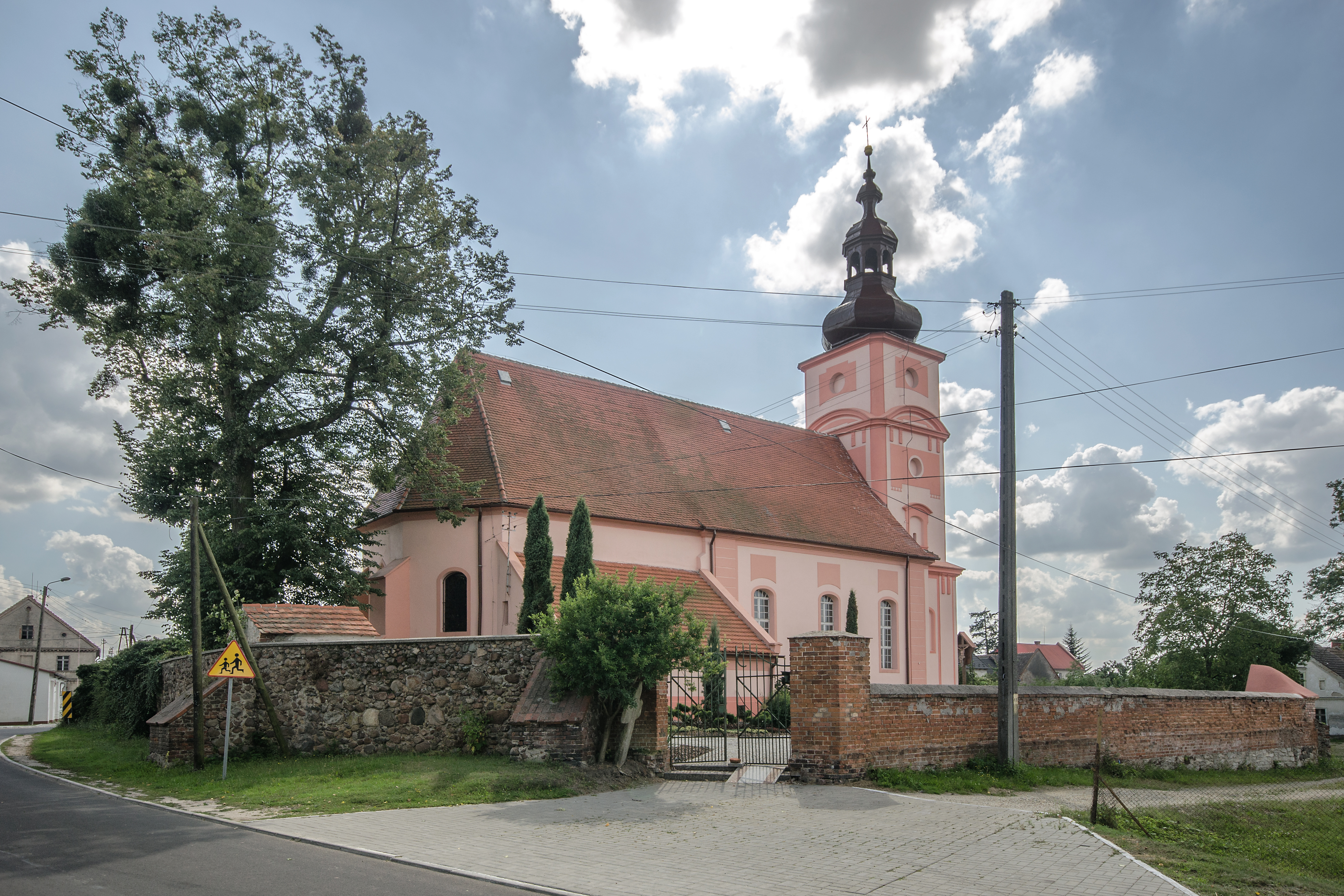
- Catholic church

- Location within Poland
- Coordinates: 50°45′N 17°24′E
- Country: Poland
- Voivodeship: Opole
- County: Brzeg
- Gmina: Grodków

Wierzbnik [ˈvjɛʐbnik] (German Herzogswalde) is a village in the administrative district of Gmina Grodków, within Brzeg County, Opole Voivodeship, in south-western Poland.
