= Jaszów =

- Village
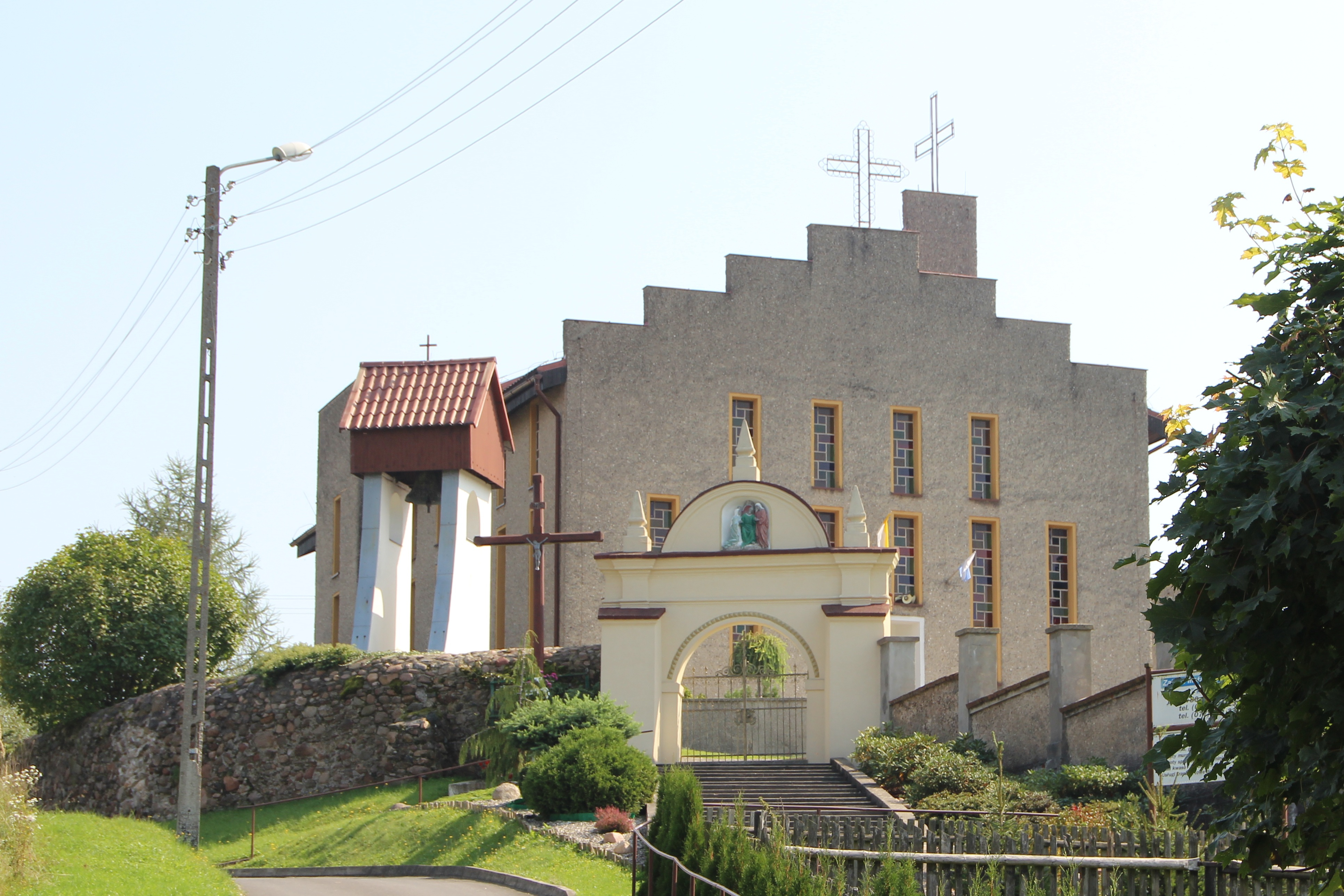

- Location within Poland
- Coordinates: 50°35′41″N 17°14′40″E
- Country: Poland
- Voivodeship: Opole
- County: Brzeg
- Gmina: Grodków

Jaszów [ˈjaʂuf] is a village in the administrative district of Gmina Grodków, within Brzeg County, Opole Voivodeship, in south-western Poland.
