= Starowice Dolne =

- Village
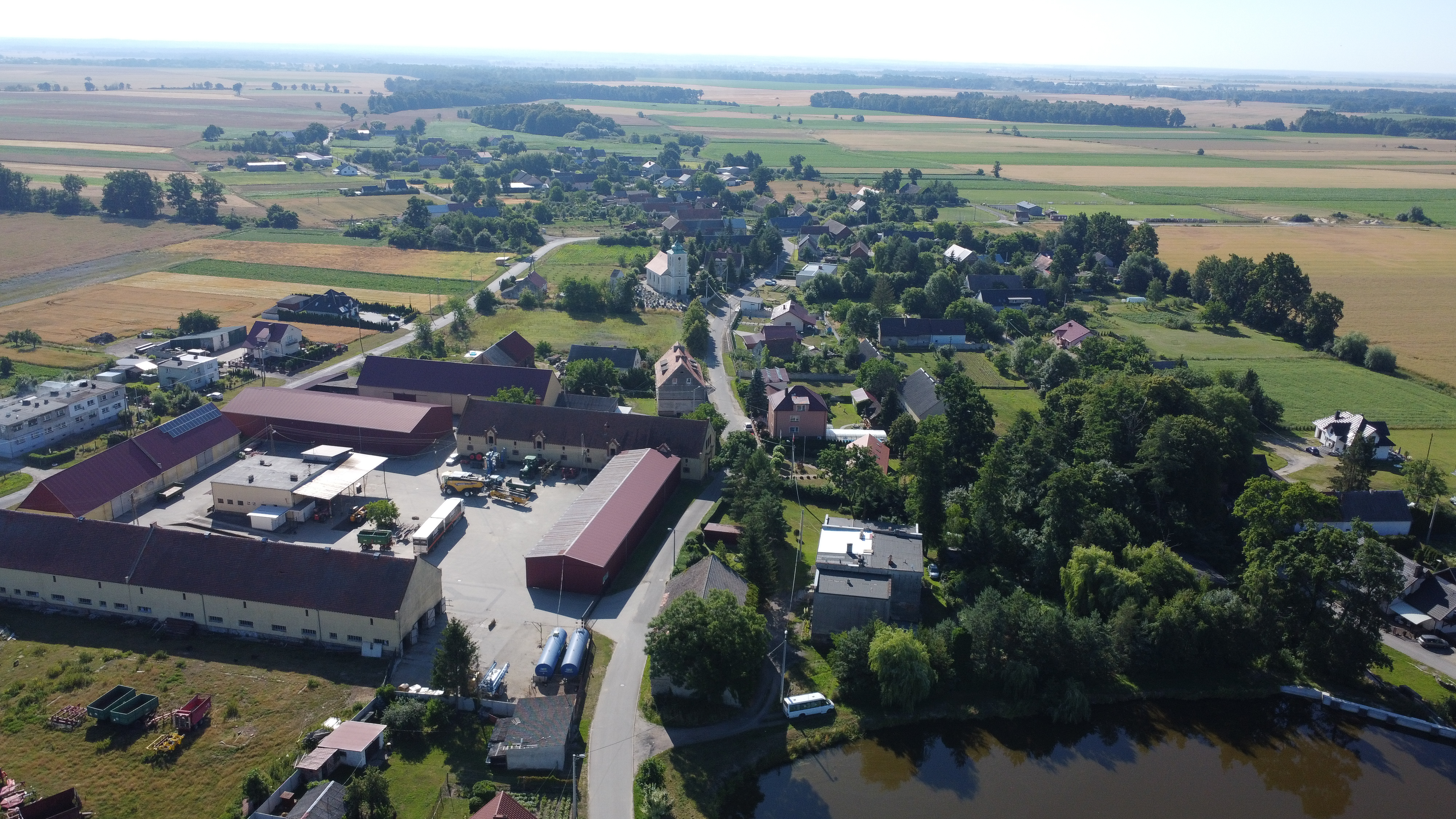
- Aerial view

- Location within Poland
- Coordinates: 50°38′36″N 17°19′40″E
- Country: Poland
- Voivodeship: Opole
- County: Brzeg
- Gmina: Grodków

Starowice Dolne [starɔˈvit͡se-ˈdɔlnɛ] (German: Hönigsdorf) is a village in the administrative district of Gmina Grodków, within Brzeg County, Opole Voivodeship, in south-western Poland.
