= Nowa Wieś Mała, Gmina Grodków =

Nowa Wieś Mała
- Village
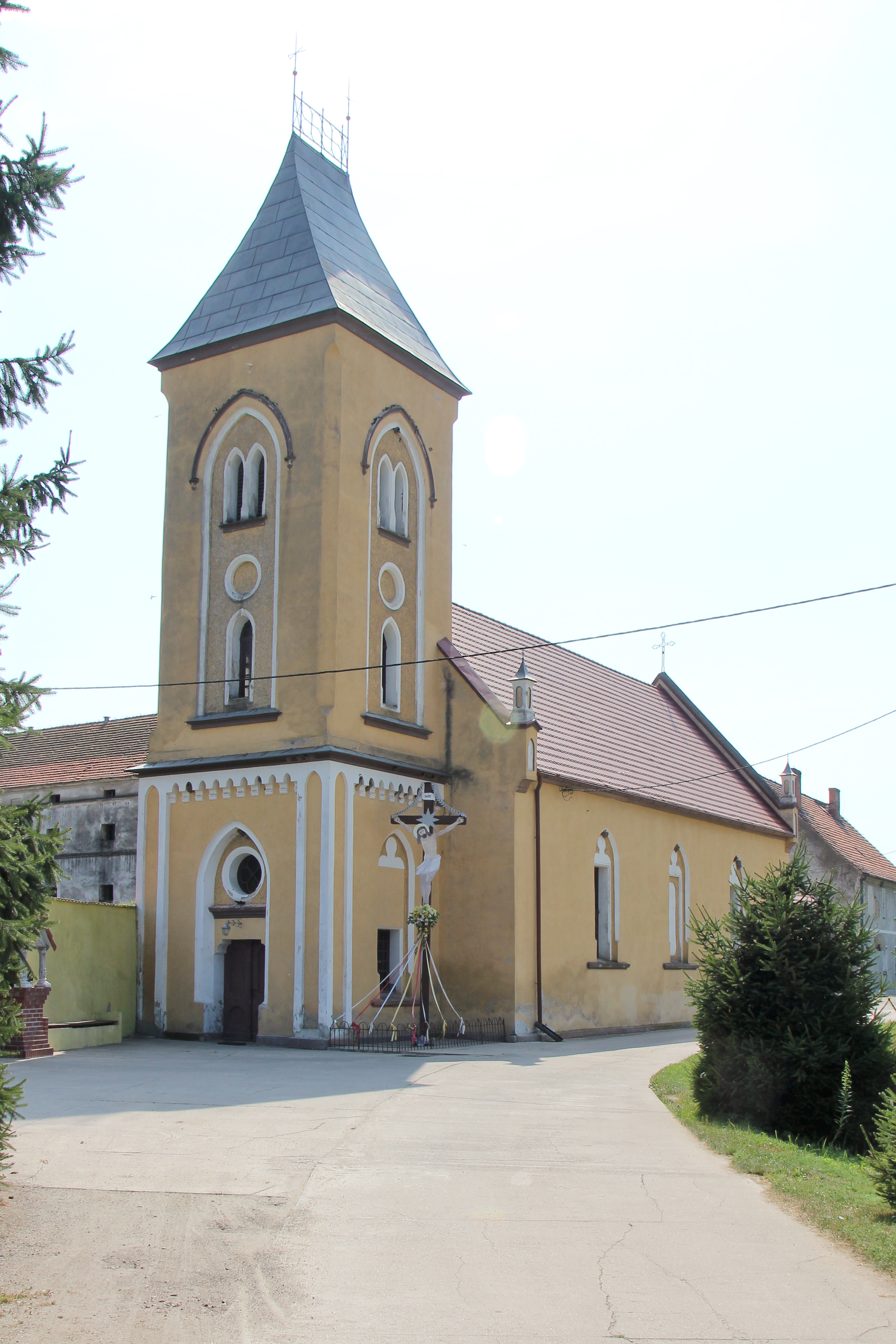

- Location within Poland
- Coordinates: 50°40′36″N 17°23′10″E
- Country: Poland
- Voivodeship: Opole
- County: Brzeg
- Gmina: Grodków

Nowa Wieś Mała [ˈnɔva ˈvjɛɕ ˈmawa] (German Klein Neudorf) is a village in the administrative district of Gmina Grodków, within Brzeg County, Opole Voivodeship, in south-western Poland.
