= Tarnów Grodkowski =

- Village
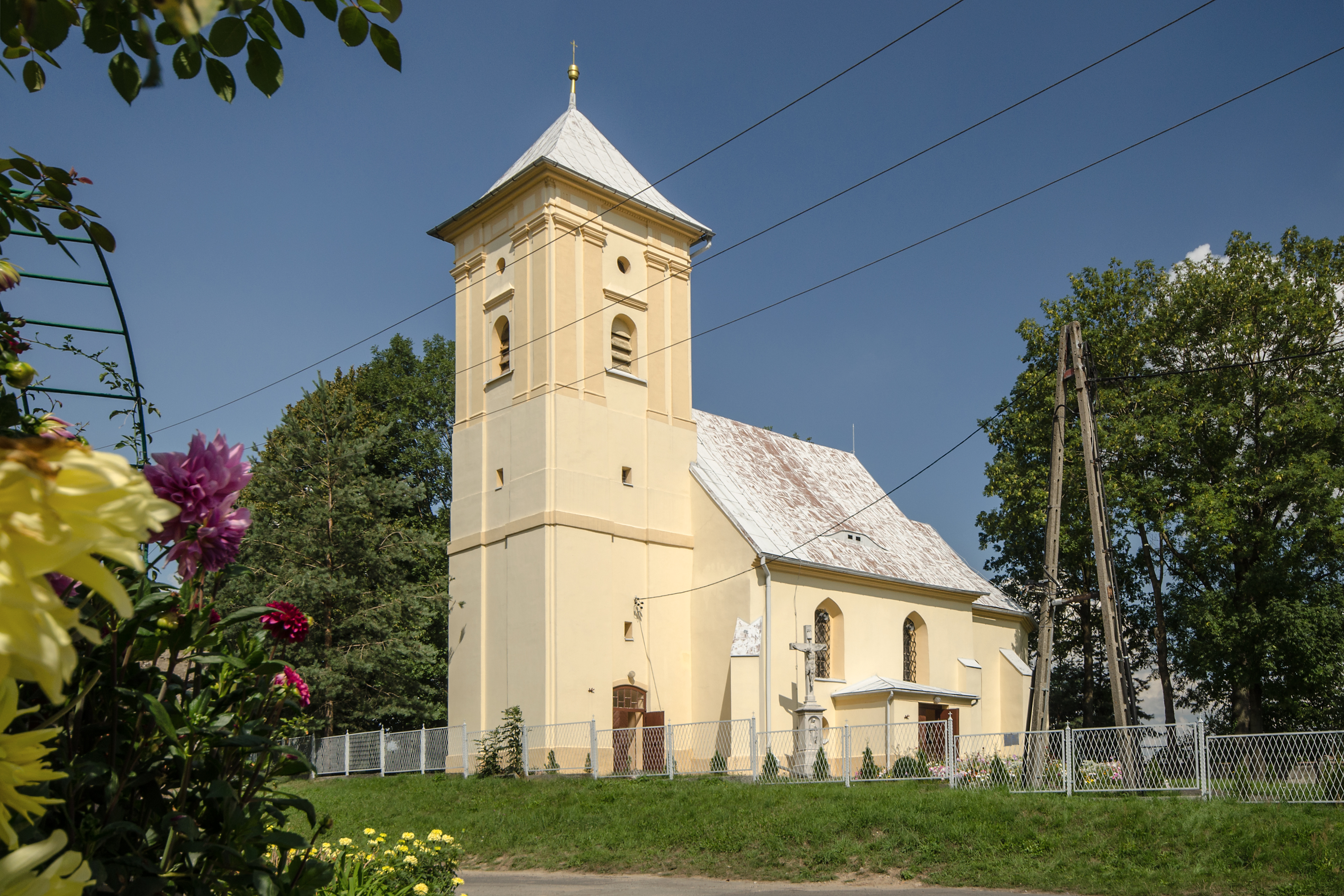
- Church of Saint Anne

- Location within Poland
- Coordinates: 50°42′14″N 17°23′46″E
- Country: Poland
- Voivodeship: Opole
- County: Brzeg
- Gmina: Grodków

Tarnów Grodkowski [ˈtarnuf ɡrɔtˈkɔfski] is a village in the administrative district of Gmina Grodków, within Brzeg County, Opole Voivodeship, in south-western Poland.
