= Osiek Grodkowski =

- Village
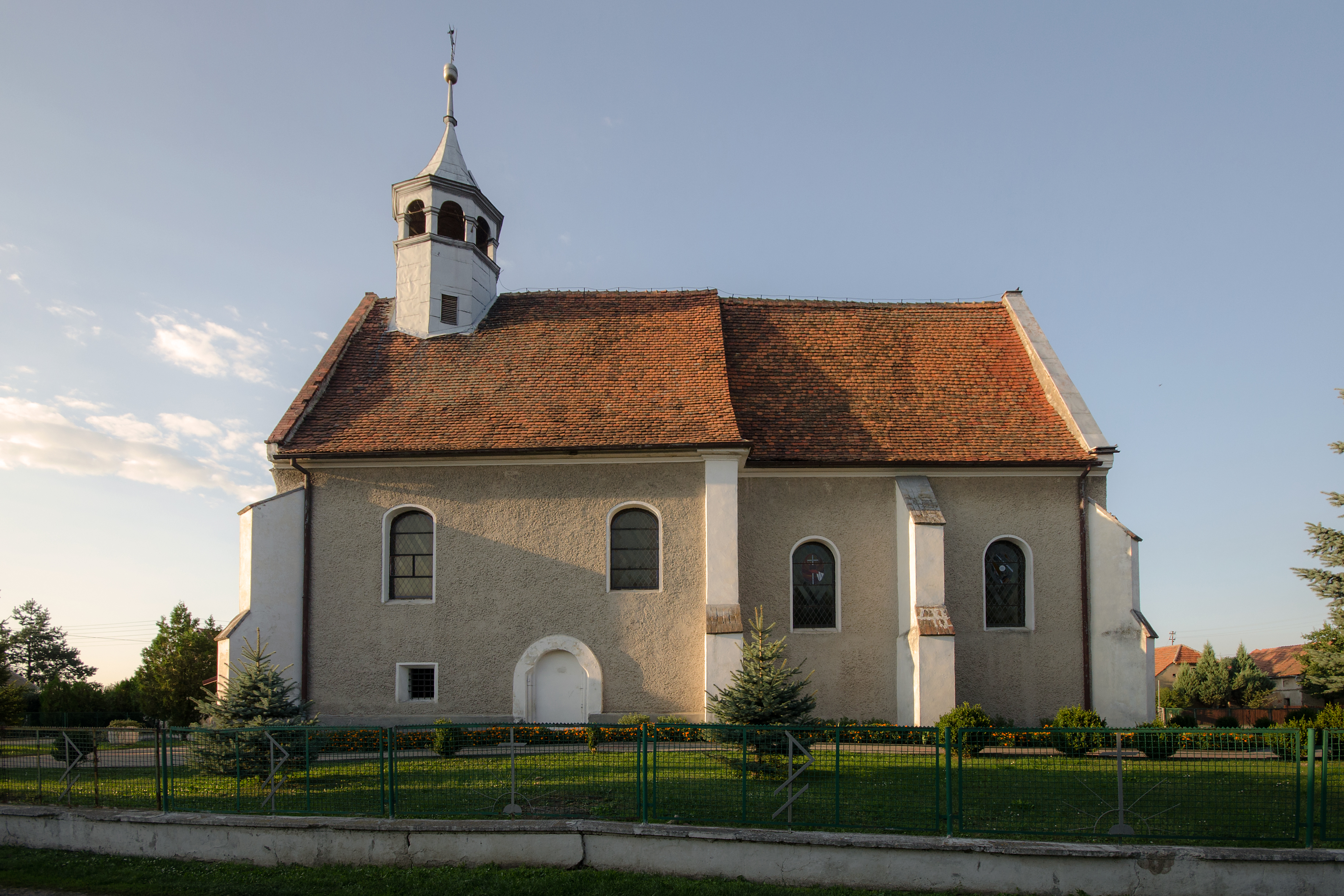
- Church of the Assumption of the Virgin Mary

- Location within Poland
- Coordinates: 50°42′42″N 17°27′56″E
- Country: Poland
- Voivodeship: Opole
- County: Brzeg
- Gmina: Grodków

Osiek Grodkowski [ˈɔɕɛk ɡrɔtˈkɔfski] is a village in the administrative district of Gmina Grodków, within Brzeg County, Opole Voivodeship, in south-western Poland.
