= Wojnowiczki =

- Village
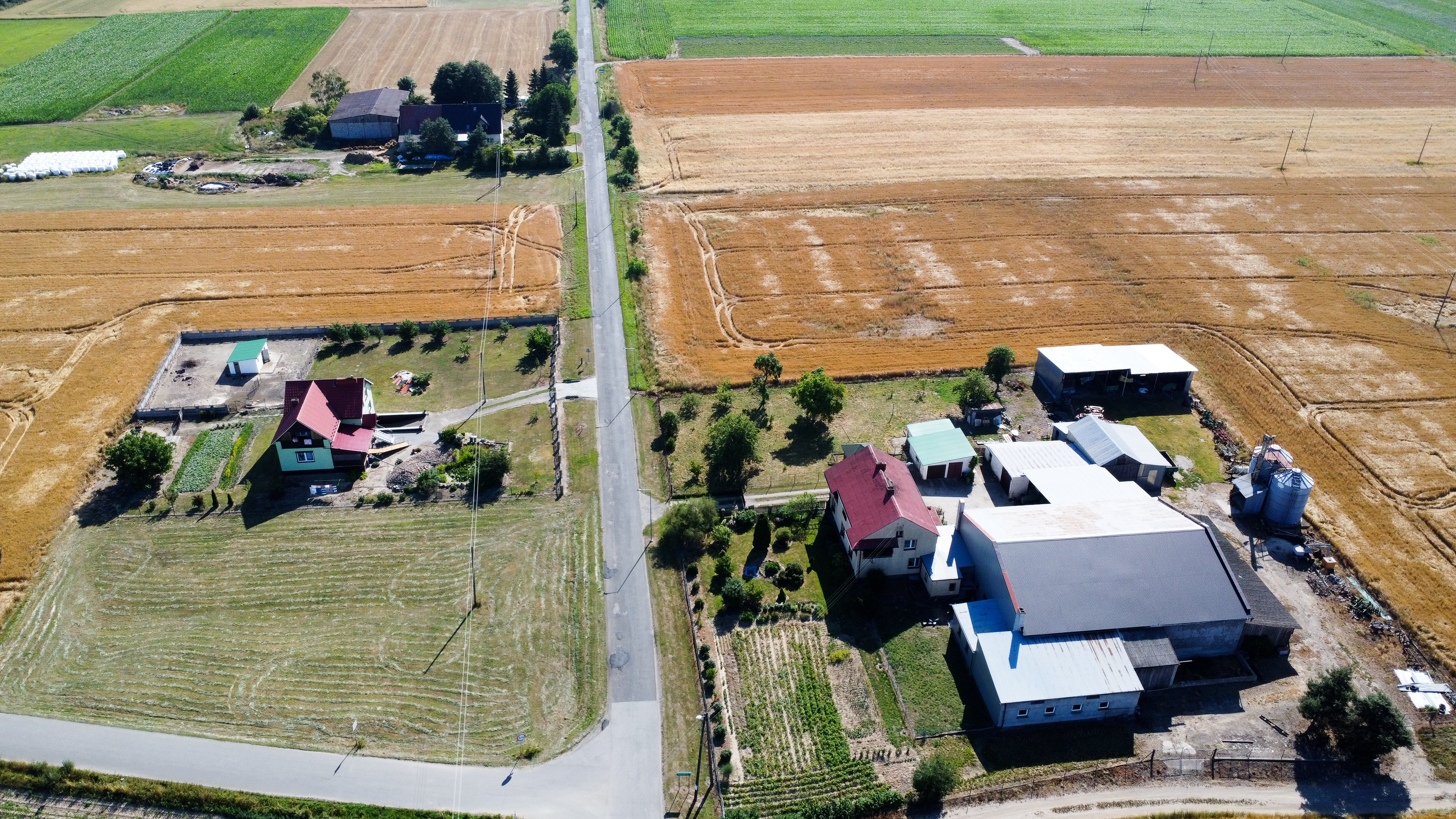

- Location within Poland
- Coordinates: 50°37′45″N 17°18′56″E
- Country: Poland
- Voivodeship: Opole
- County: Brzeg
- Gmina: Grodków

Wojnowiczki [vɔi̯nɔˈvit͡ʂki] is a village in the administrative district of Gmina Grodków, within Brzeg County, Opole Voivodeship, in south-western Poland.
