= Lipowa Śląska railway station =

Railway station in Brzeg County, Poland

Lipowa Śląska
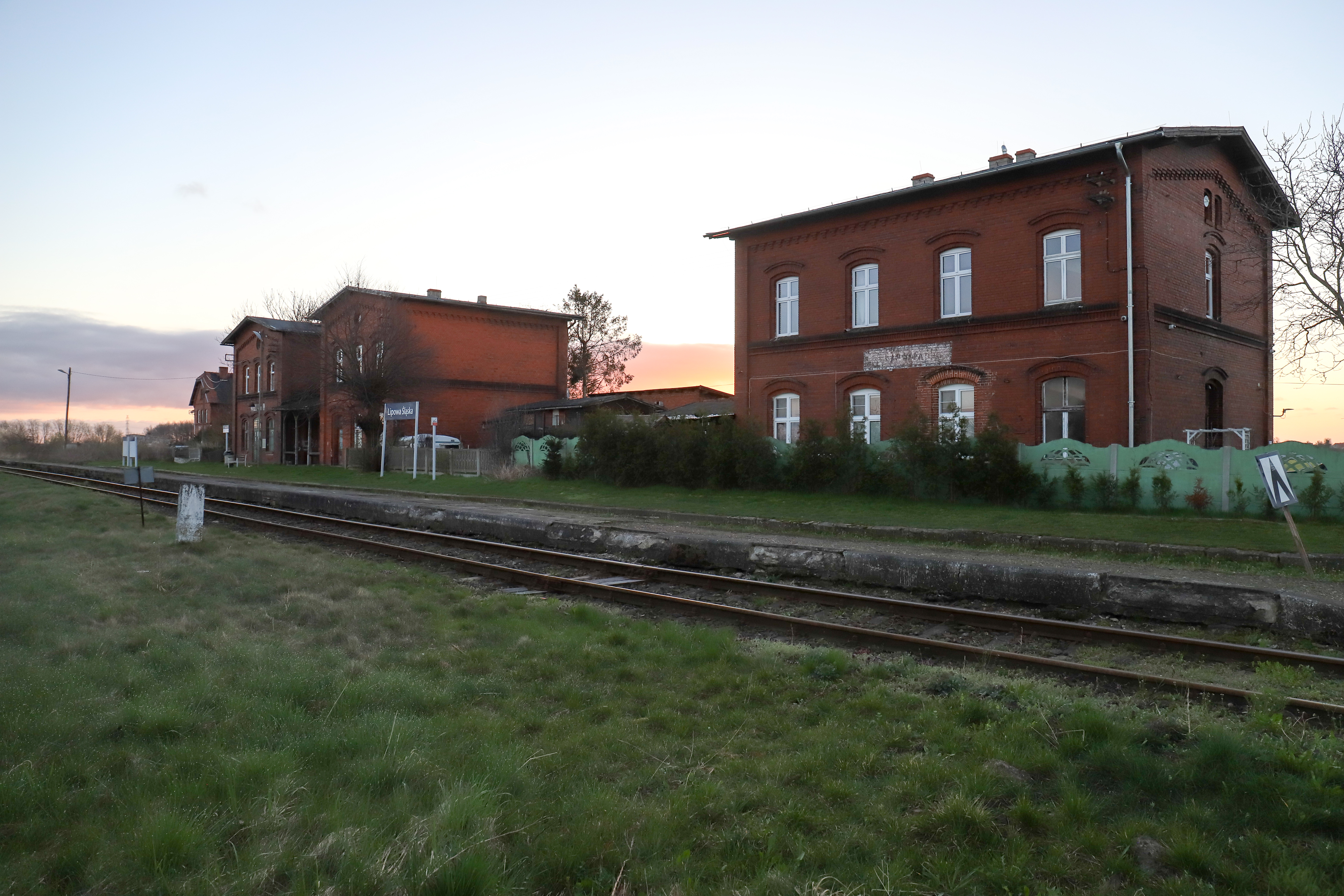
- Lipowa Śląska railway station

General information
- Location: Lipowa, Opole Voivodeship; Poland
- Coordinates: 50.7369°N 17.4272°E
- Owner: Polskie Koleje Państwowe S.A.
- Platforms: 2

History
- Opened: 1847
- Former names: Deutsch Leippe
Location
- Location within Poland

Lipowa Śląska railway station is a station in Lipowa, Opole Voivodeship, Poland.

The present railway station building was constructed in 1912.

== Connections ==
- 288 Nysa - Brzeg
- 329 Szydłów - Lipowa Śląska
