= Bogdanów, Opole Voivodeship =

Bogdanów
- Village
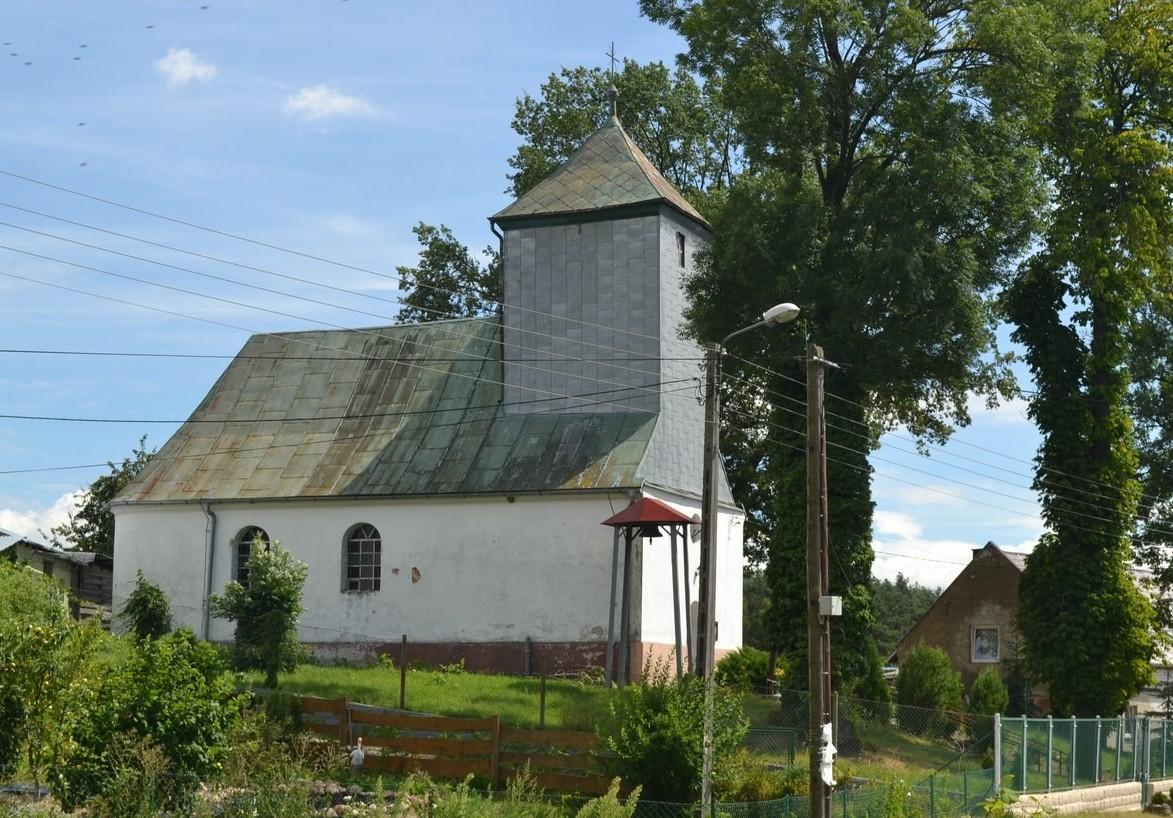
- Catholic church

- Location within Poland
- Coordinates: 50°36′46″N 17°15′38″E
- Country: Poland
- Voivodeship: Opole
- County: Brzeg
- Gmina: Grodków

Bogdanów [bɔɡˈdanuf] is a village in the administrative district of Gmina Grodków, within Brzeg County, Opole Voivodeship, in south-western Poland.
