= Młodoszowice =

- Village
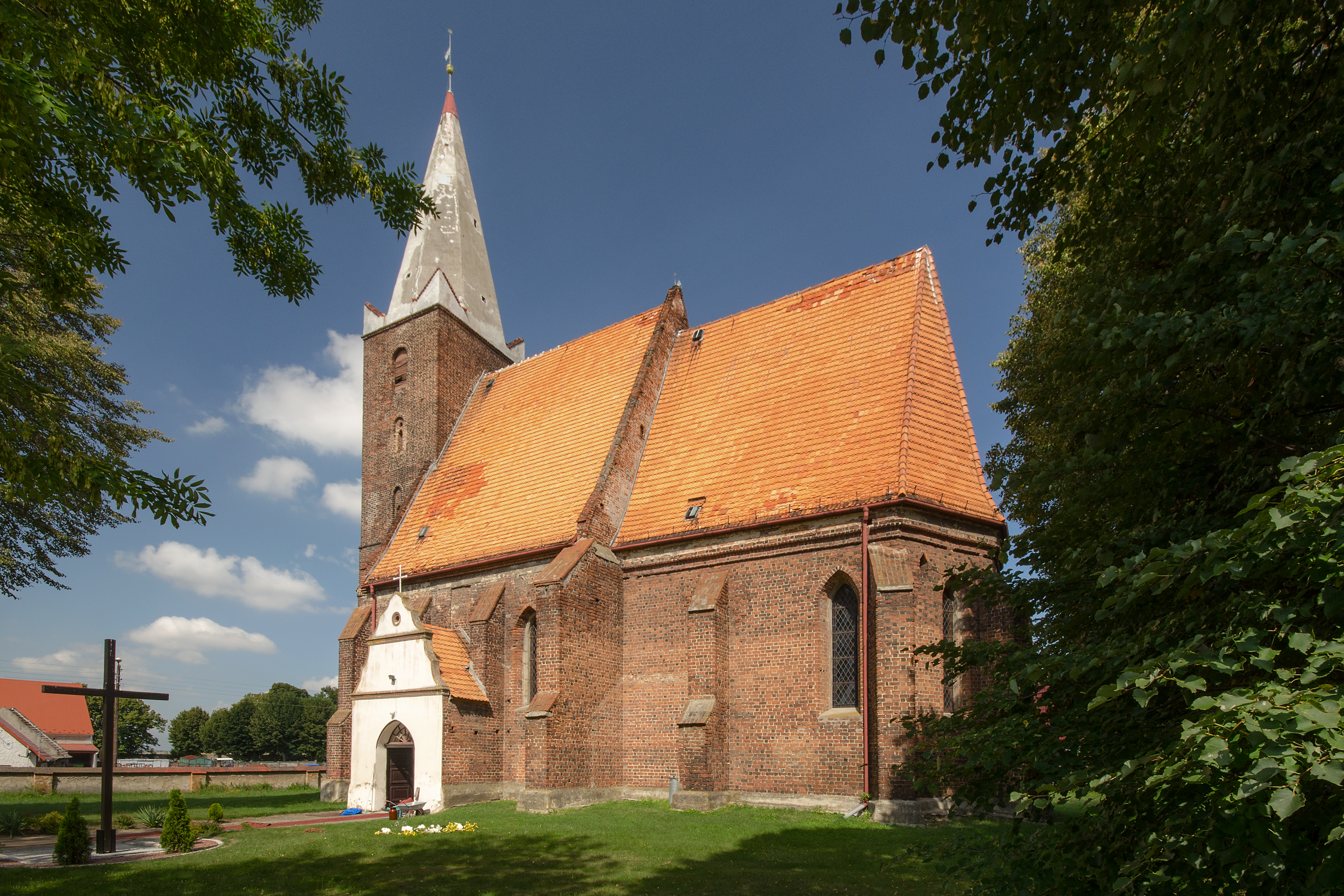
- Church of Saint Martin

- Location within Poland
- Coordinates: 50°46′12″N 17°19′48″E
- Country: Poland
- Voivodeship: Opole
- County: Brzeg
- Gmina: Grodków

Młodoszowice [mwɔdɔʂɔˈvit͡sɛ] (German: Zindel) is a village in the administrative district of Gmina Grodków, within Brzeg County, Opole Voivodeship, in south-western Poland.
