= Żelazna, Brzeg County =

Żelazna
- Village
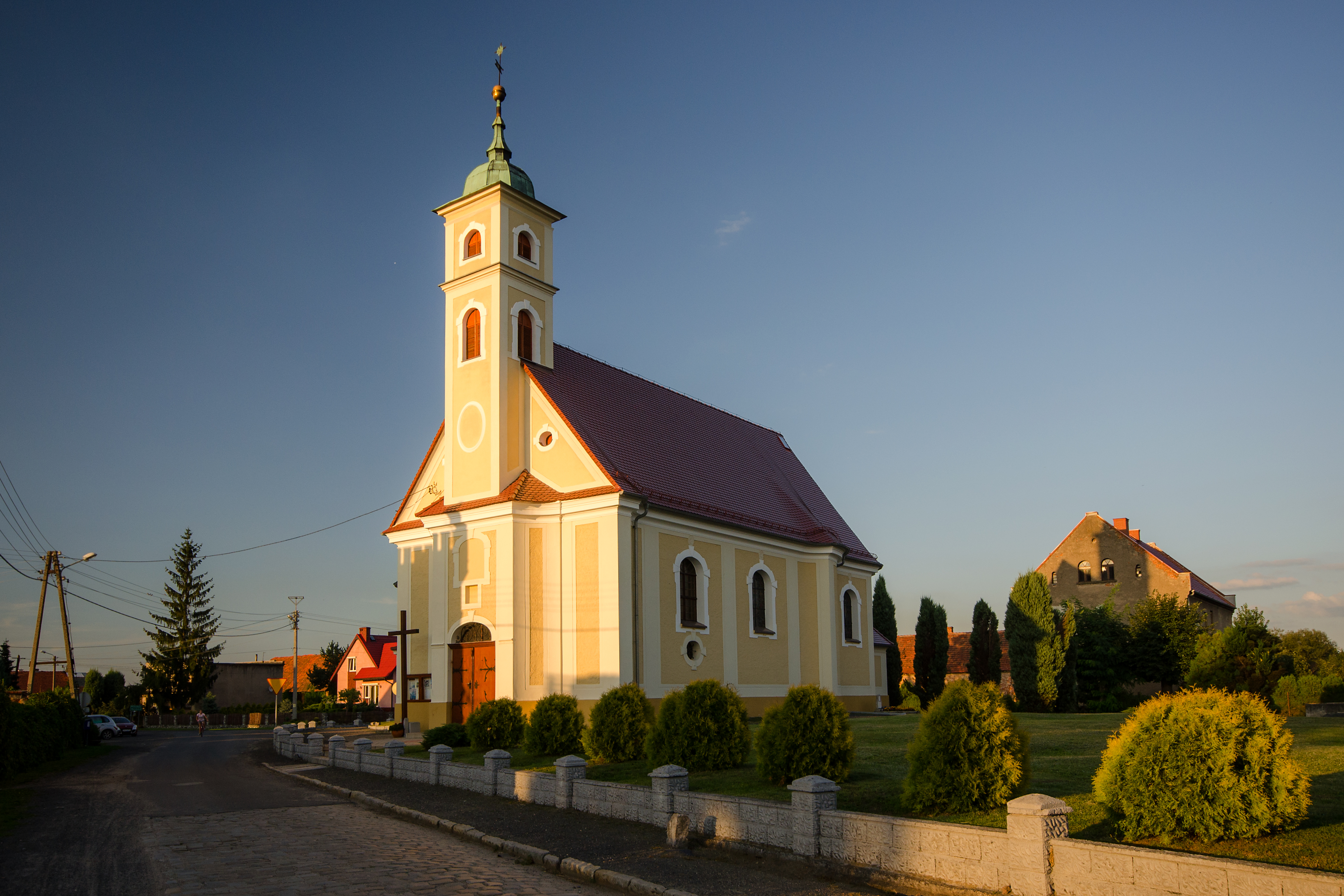
- Catholic church

- Location within Poland
- Coordinates: 50°41′N 17°27′E
- Country: Poland
- Voivodeship: Opole
- County: Brzeg
- Gmina: Grodków

Żelazna [ʐɛˈlazna] is a village in the administrative district of Gmina Grodków, within Brzeg County, Opole Voivodeship, in south-western Poland.
