= Przylesie Dolne =

- Village
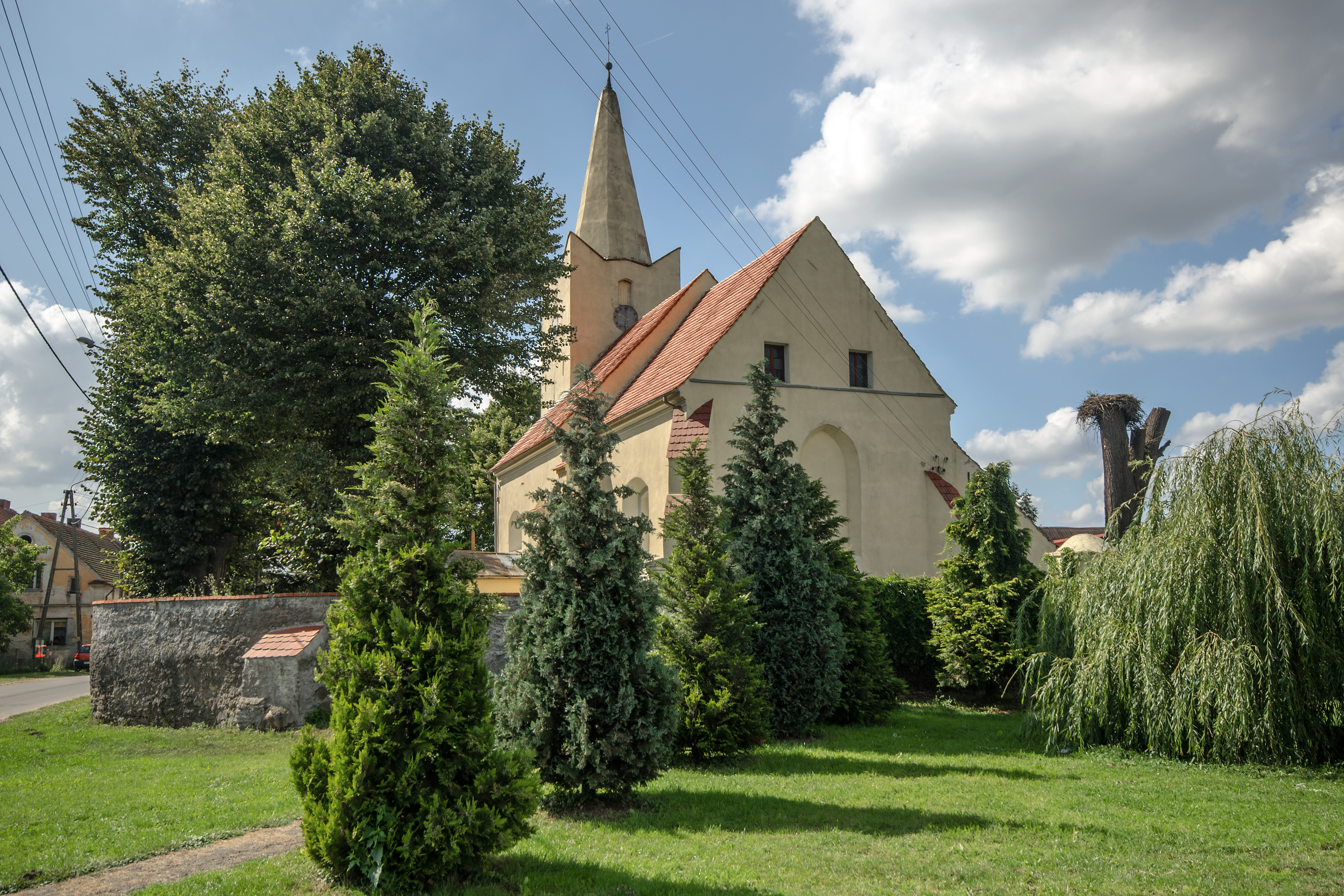
- Church of Saints Peter and Paul

- Location within Poland
- Coordinates: 50°44′34″N 17°25′7″E
- Country: Poland
- Voivodeship: Opole
- County: Brzeg
- Gmina: Grodków

Przylesie Dolne [pʂɨˈlɛɕɛ ˈdɔlnɛ] (German: Niederseiffersdorf) is a village in the administrative district of Gmina Grodków, within Brzeg County, Opole Voivodeship, in south-western Poland.
