= Lubcz, Opole Voivodeship =

Lubcz
- Village
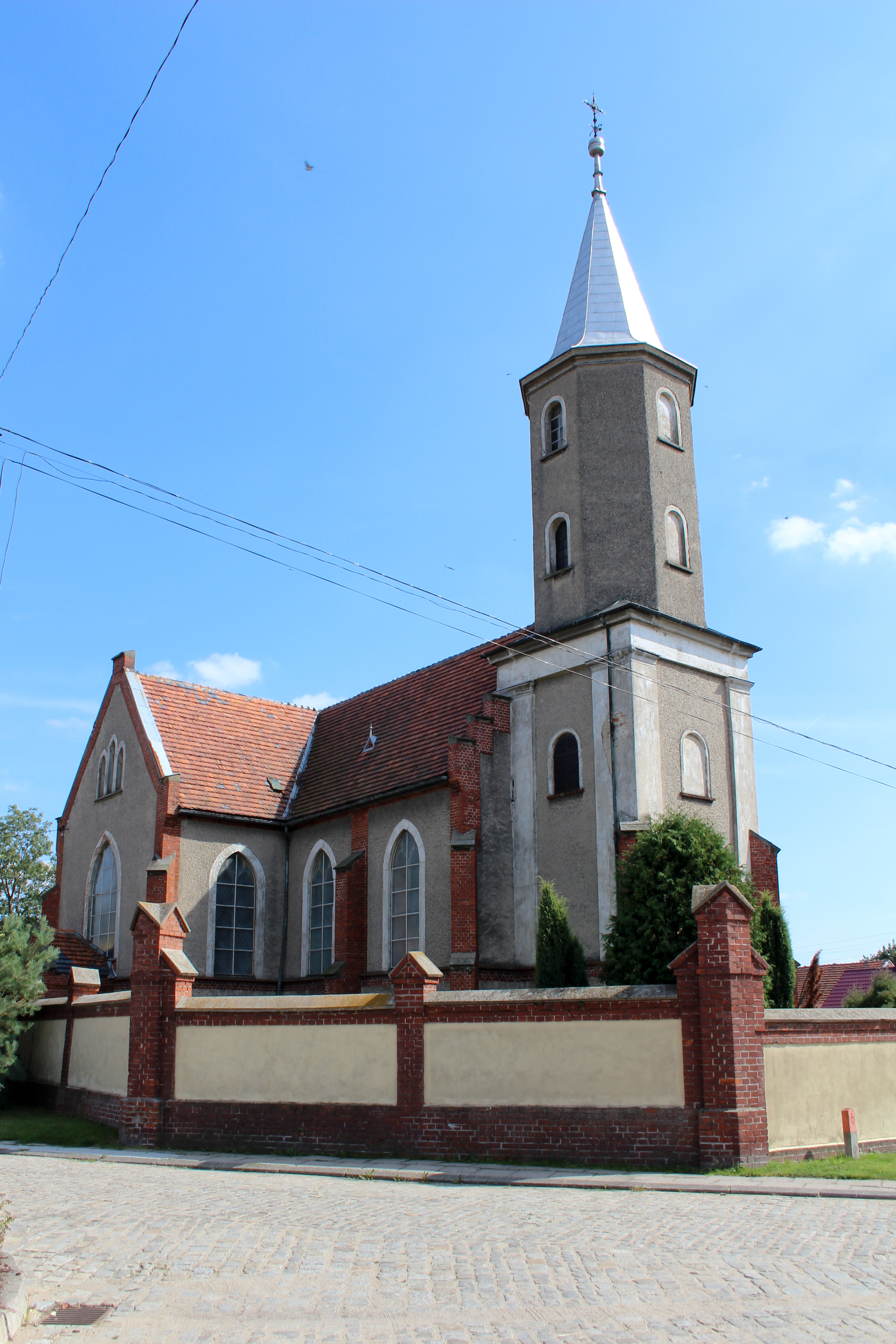
- Church

- Location within Poland
- Coordinates: 50°43′5″N 17°21′2″E
- Country: Poland
- Voivodeship: Opole
- County: Brzeg
- Gmina: Grodków

Lubcz [lupt͡ʂ] (German Leuppusch) is a village in the administrative district of Gmina Grodków, within Brzeg County, Opole Voivodeship, in south-western Poland.
