= Wójtowice, Opole Voivodeship =

Wójtowice
- Village
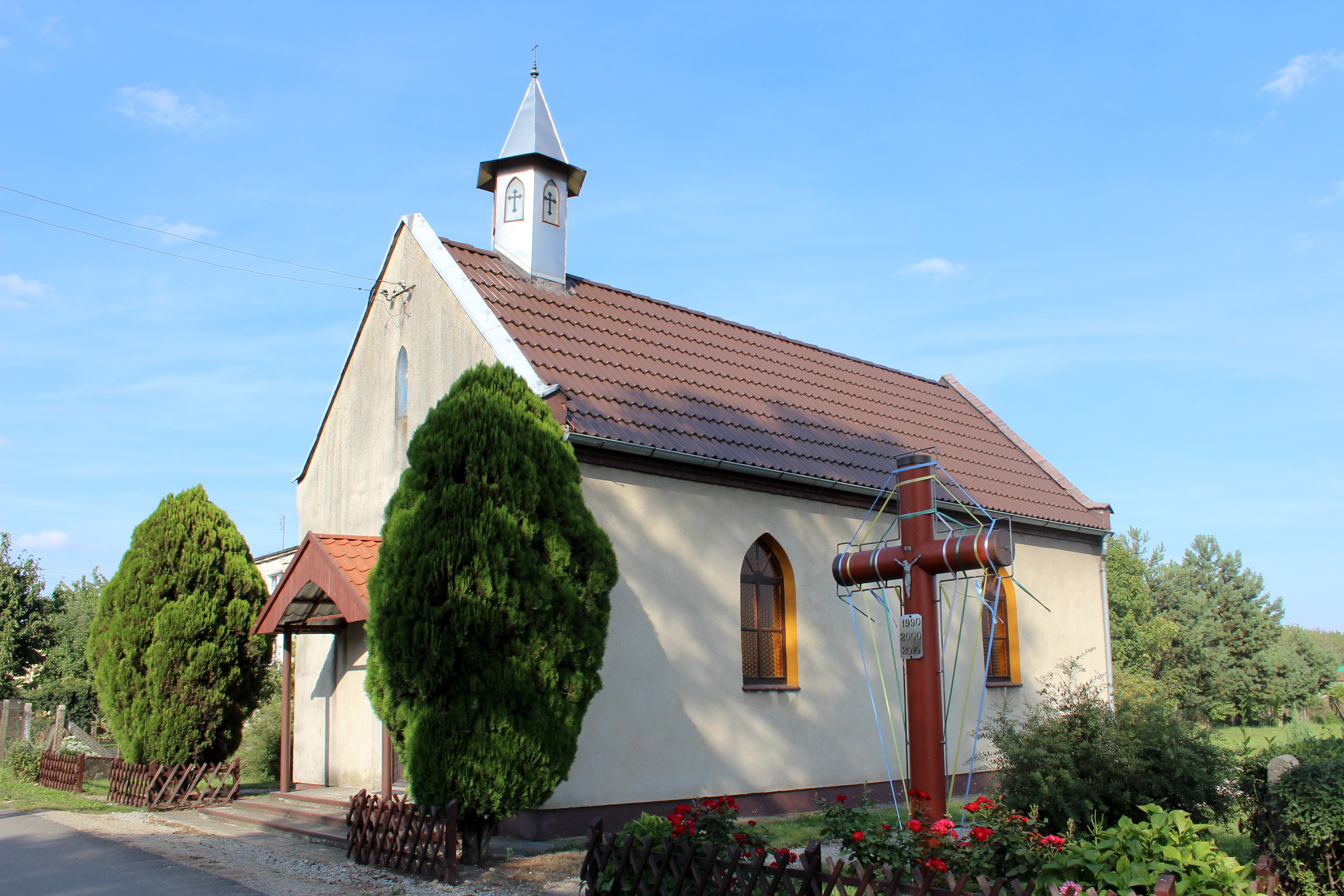
- Chapel

- Location within Poland
- Coordinates: 50°40′42″N 17°19′21″E
- Country: Poland
- Voivodeship: Opole
- County: Brzeg
- Gmina: Grodków

Wójtowice [vui̯tɔˈvit͡sɛ] (German: Voigtsdorf) is a village in the administrative district of Gmina Grodków, within Brzeg County, Opole Voivodeship, in south-western Poland.
