= Żarów, Opole Voivodeship =

Żarów
- Village
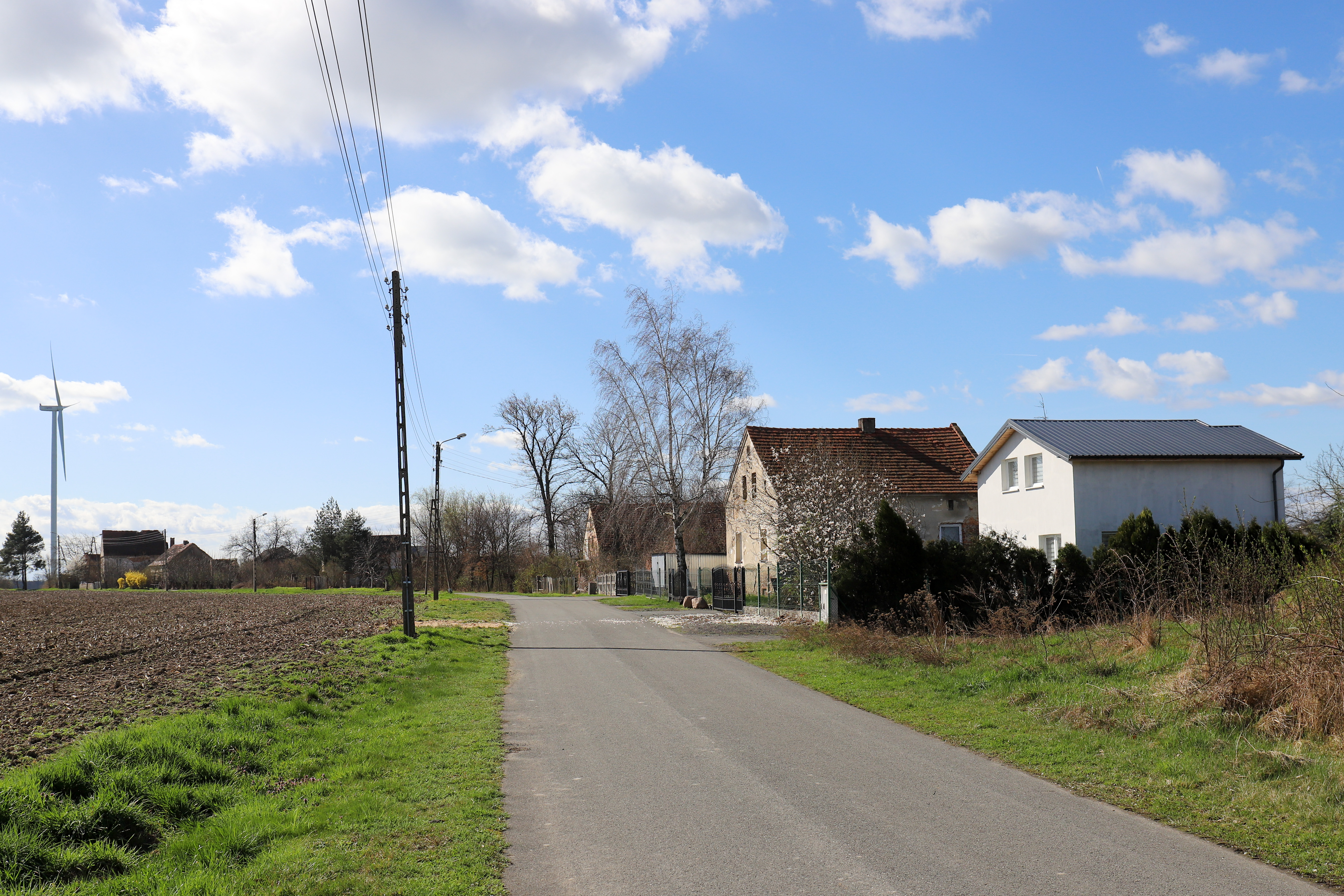

- Location within Poland
- Coordinates: 50°39′N 17°21′E
- Country: Poland
- Voivodeship: Opole
- County: Brzeg
- Gmina: Grodków

Żarów [ˈʐaruf] is a village in the administrative district of Gmina Grodków, within Brzeg County, Opole Voivodeship, in south-western Poland.
