= Kobiela (surname) =

Kobiela, less commonly Kobiella, is a Polish surname. Notable people with the surname include:

- Bogumił Kobiela (1931–1969), Polish actor
- Dorota Kobiela (born 1978), Polish filmmaker
