= Kobiela, Opole Voivodeship =

Kobiela
- Village
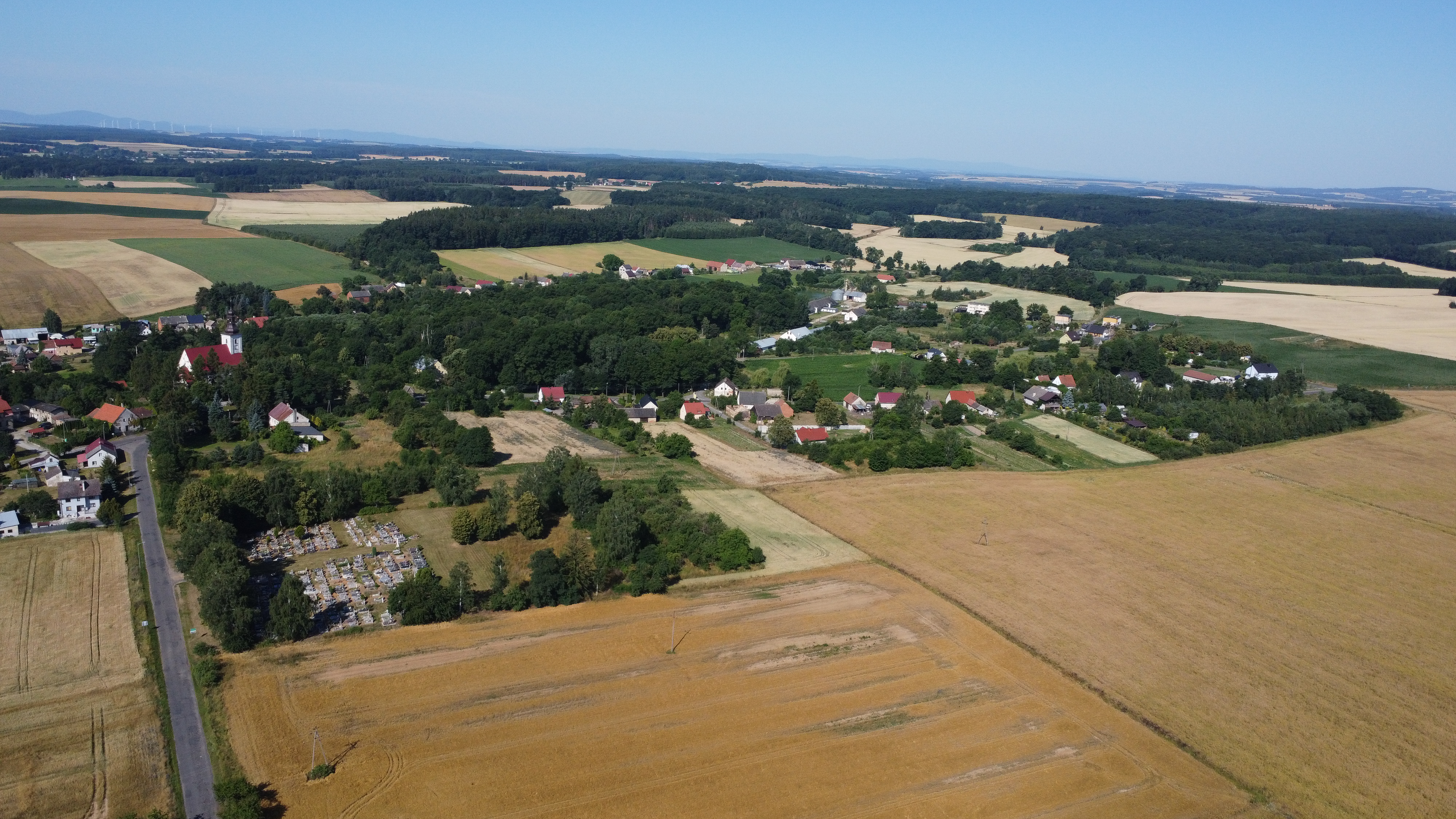

- Location within Poland
- Coordinates: 50°37′4″N 17°17′38″E
- Country: Poland
- Voivodeship: Opole
- County: Brzeg
- Gmina: Grodków

Kobiela [kɔˈbjɛla] (German Kühschmalz) is a village in the administrative district of Gmina Grodków, within Brzeg County, Opole Voivodeship, in south-western Poland.
