= Bąków, Brzeg County =

Bąków
- Village
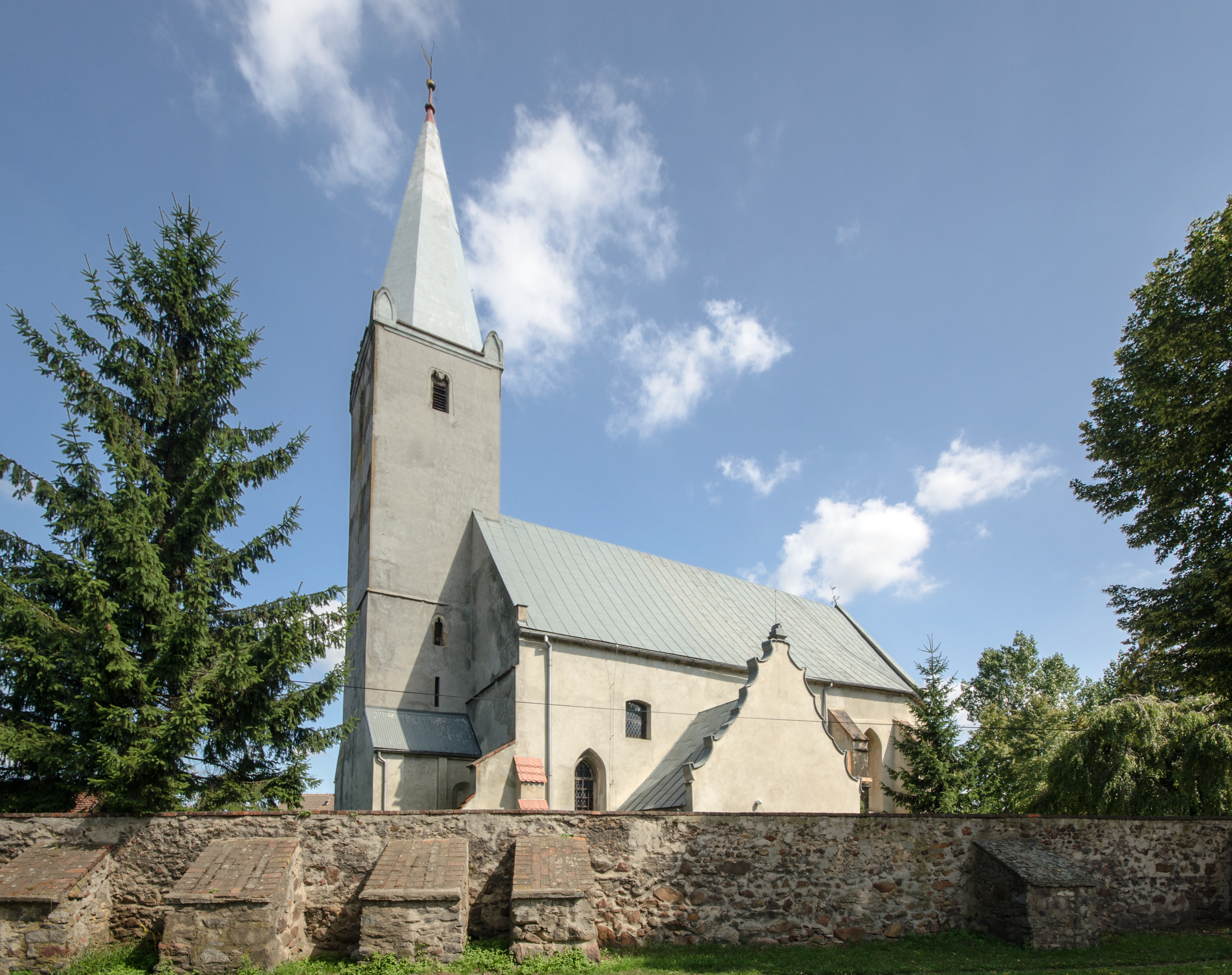
- St. Catherine's Church

- Location within Poland
- Coordinates: 50°46′N 17°17′E
- Country: Poland
- Voivodeship: Opole
- County: Brzeg
- Gmina: Grodków
- Population (approx.): 600

Bąków [ˈbɔnkuf] is a village in the administrative district of Gmina Grodków, within Brzeg County, Opole Voivodeship, in south-western Poland.

== Places of cultural and tourist interest ==
- St. Catherine's Church (kościół filialny pw. św. Katarzyny) - a Roman Catholic church built during the reign of Preczlaw of Pogarell in the Gothic architectural style. The church was built under the patronage of the commandry of the Sovereign Military Order of Malta in Oleśnica Mała. In between the years of 1535 and 1945 the church was an evangelical church.
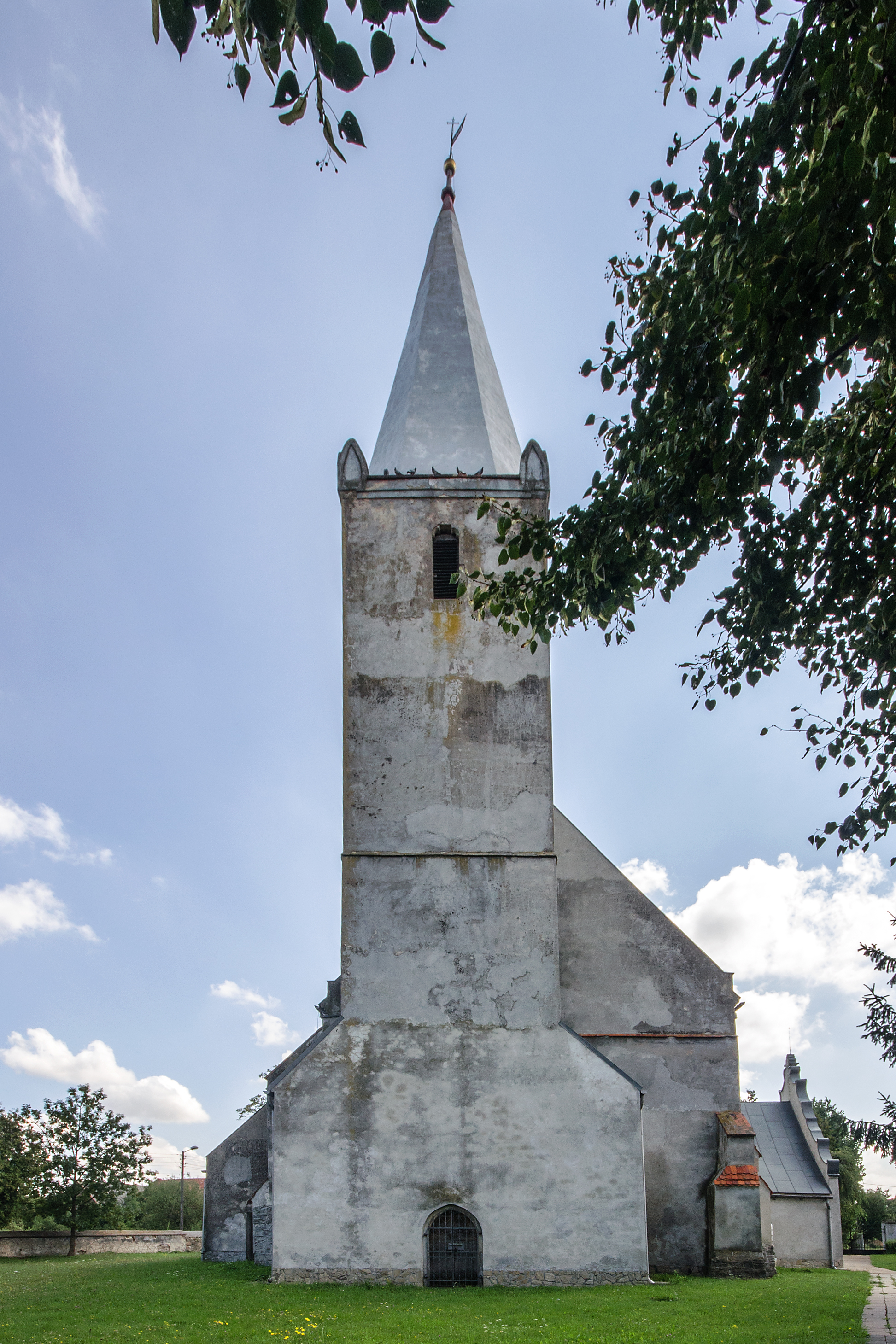
St. Catherine's Church

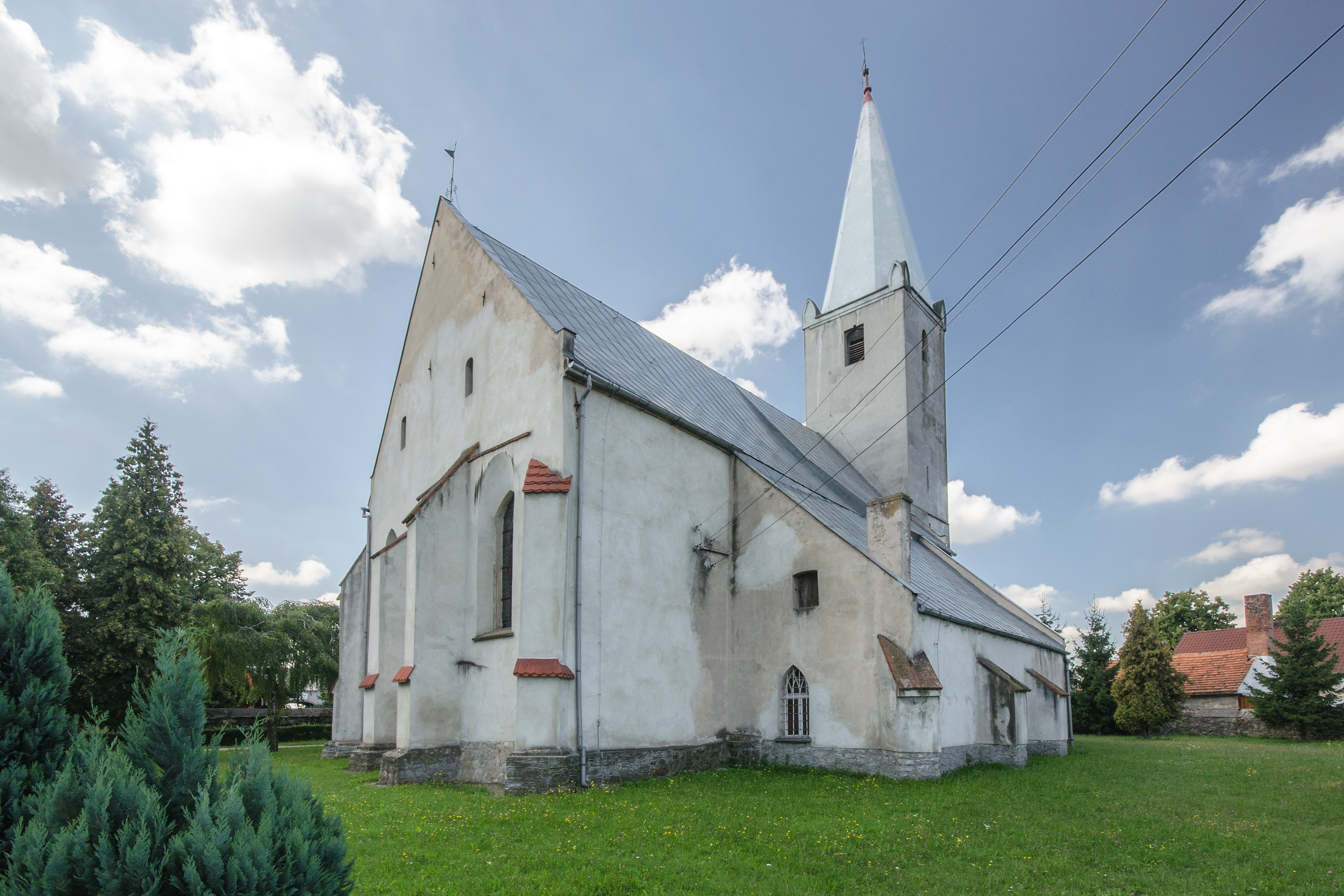
St. Catherine's Church
