= Jędrzejów, Opole Voivodeship =

Jędrzejów
- Village
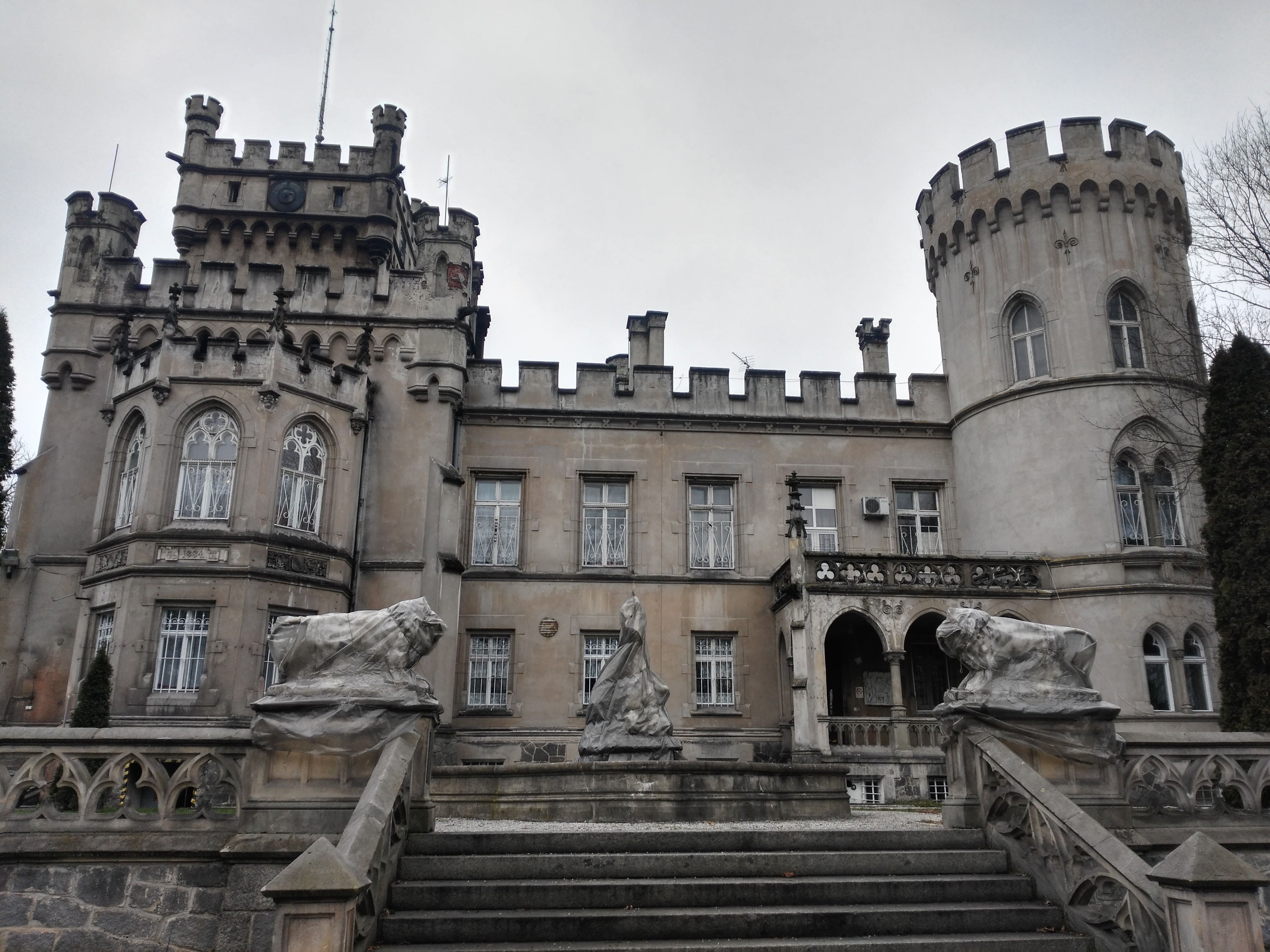
- Palace

- Location within Poland
- Coordinates: 50°39′36″N 17°18′44″E
- Country: Poland
- Voivodeship: Opole
- County: Brzeg
- Gmina: Grodków

Jędrzejów (Polish: [jɛnˈdʐɛjuf]) is a village in the administrative district of Gmina Grodków, within Brzeg County, Opole Voivodeship, in south-western Poland.
