= Boruta =

Boruta may refer to:

- Boruta, Opole Voivodeship, a village in Poland
- Boruta (surname)
- Devil Boruta, a folkloric character
- Boruta, 8th-century Carantanian chieftain; see Boruth

== See also ==
- Borut (disambiguation)
- Boruto (disambiguation)
- Borutta
- Boruth
