= Kopalina =

Kopalina may refer to:

- Kopalina, Lower Silesian Voivodeship (south-west Poland)
- Kopalina, Greater Poland Voivodeship (west-central Poland)
- Kopalina, Brzeg County in Opole Voivodeship (south-west Poland)
- Kopalina, Krapkowice County in Opole Voivodeship (south-west Poland)
- Kopalina, Gmina Domaszowice in Opole Voivodeship (south-west Poland)
- Kopalina, Gmina Pokój in Opole Voivodeship (south-west Poland)
