= Myśliborzyce, Opole Voivodeship =

Myśliborzyce
- Village
- Location within Poland
- Coordinates: 50°54′03″N 17°28′36″E
- Country: Poland
- Voivodeship: Opole
- County: Brzeg
- Gmina: Lubsza
- Population: 148

Myśliborzyce [mɨɕlibɔˈʐɨt͡sɛ] is a village in the administrative district of Gmina Lubsza, within Brzeg County, Opole Voivodeship, in south-western Poland. Previous names of the village: Nitberg, Schöneiche, Luisental.

== Transport ==
Myśliborzyce lies between the National Road 39 and 396 road routes and connects to Warsaw via the E67 and A2 in under 4 hours. The closest major cities are Katowice, Kraków and Łódź.

Myśliborzyce has no local train station, the closest being in the neighbouring town of Brzeg, which has routes to neighbouring towns and cities, as well as direct transport to the capital; routes are operated by PKP Intercity and Polregio. The closest airport is Katowice Airport.
