= Śmieszka (river) =

Location
- Country: Poland
- Voivodeship: Opole

Physical characteristics
- Source
  - location: northeast of Stare Kolnie, Opole County
  - coordinates: 50°51′14″N 17°41′15″E
- Mouth: Smortawa
  - location: northwest of Błota, Brzeg County
  - coordinates: 50°57′05″N 17°26′00″E
  - elevation: 128.2 m (421 ft)
- Length: 23.23 km (14.43 mi)

Basin features
- Progression: Smortawa→ Oder→ Baltic Sea

The Śmieszka is a river in Poland, a tributary of the Smortawa near Błota
