= National road 39 (Poland) =

Road in Poland

National Road 39
- Droga krajowa nr 39

Route information
- Maintained by GDDKiA
- Length: 116 km (72 mi)

Major junctions
- From: Łagiewniki
- To: Kępno

Location
- Country: Poland
- Regions: Opole Voivodeship; Lower Silesian Voivodeship; Greater Poland Voivodeship
- Major cities: Strzelin, Brzeg, Kępno

Highway system
- National roads in Poland; Voivodeship roads
← DK 38	→ DK 40

National Road 39 (Polish: Droga krajowa 39) is a route belonging to the Polish national roads network. It runs through Łagiewniki in the Lower Silesian Voivodeship into the Opole Voivodeship where it leads to Brzeg and joins the National Road 11 in Kępno in the Greater Poland Voivodeship.

== Important settlements along the National Road 39 ==
- Łagiewniki
- Strzelin
- Wiązów
- Brzeg
- Namysłów
- Kamienna
- Baranów
- Kępno

== Route plan ==
km	Icon	Name	Crossed roads
0		Łagiewniki	
18		Roundabout Strzelin	
22		Drive under the A4 Motorway	
30		Wiązów	—
37		Drive under the A4 Motorway	
x		Owczary	
41		Łukowice Brzeskie	
49		Brzeg	
50		Drive under a railway viaduct	—
53		Pisarzowice	
82		Namysłów	
84		Roundabout in Namysłów	
87		Kamienna	
113		Drive under a railway viaduct	—
116		Roundabout in Baranów	
