= Czepielowice =

- Village
- Location within Poland
- Coordinates: 50°52′N 17°34′E
- Country: Poland
- Voivodeship: Opole
- County: Brzeg
- Gmina: Lubsza
- Population: 800

Czepielowice [t͡ʂɛpjɛlɔˈvit͡sɛ] is a village in the administrative district of Gmina Lubsza, within Brzeg County, Opole Voivodeship, in south-western Poland.
