= Leśna Woda =

- Village
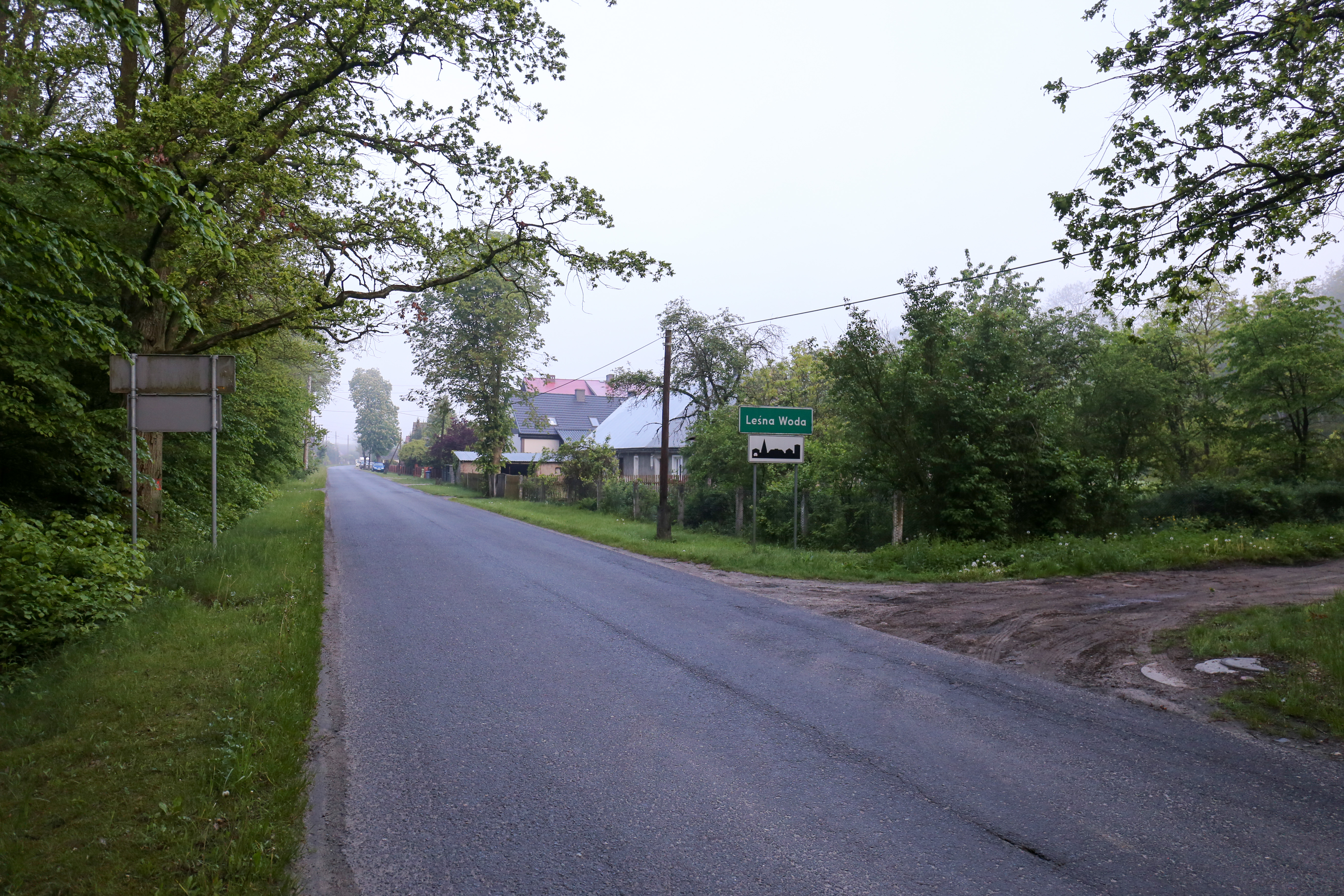

- Location within Poland
- Coordinates: 50°57′13″N 17°26′16″E
- Country: Poland
- Voivodeship: Opole
- County: Brzeg
- Gmina: Lubsza

Leśna Woda [ˈlɛɕna ˈvɔda] is a village in the administrative district of Gmina Lubsza, within Brzeg County, Opole Voivodeship, in south-western Poland.
