= Rogalice =

- Village
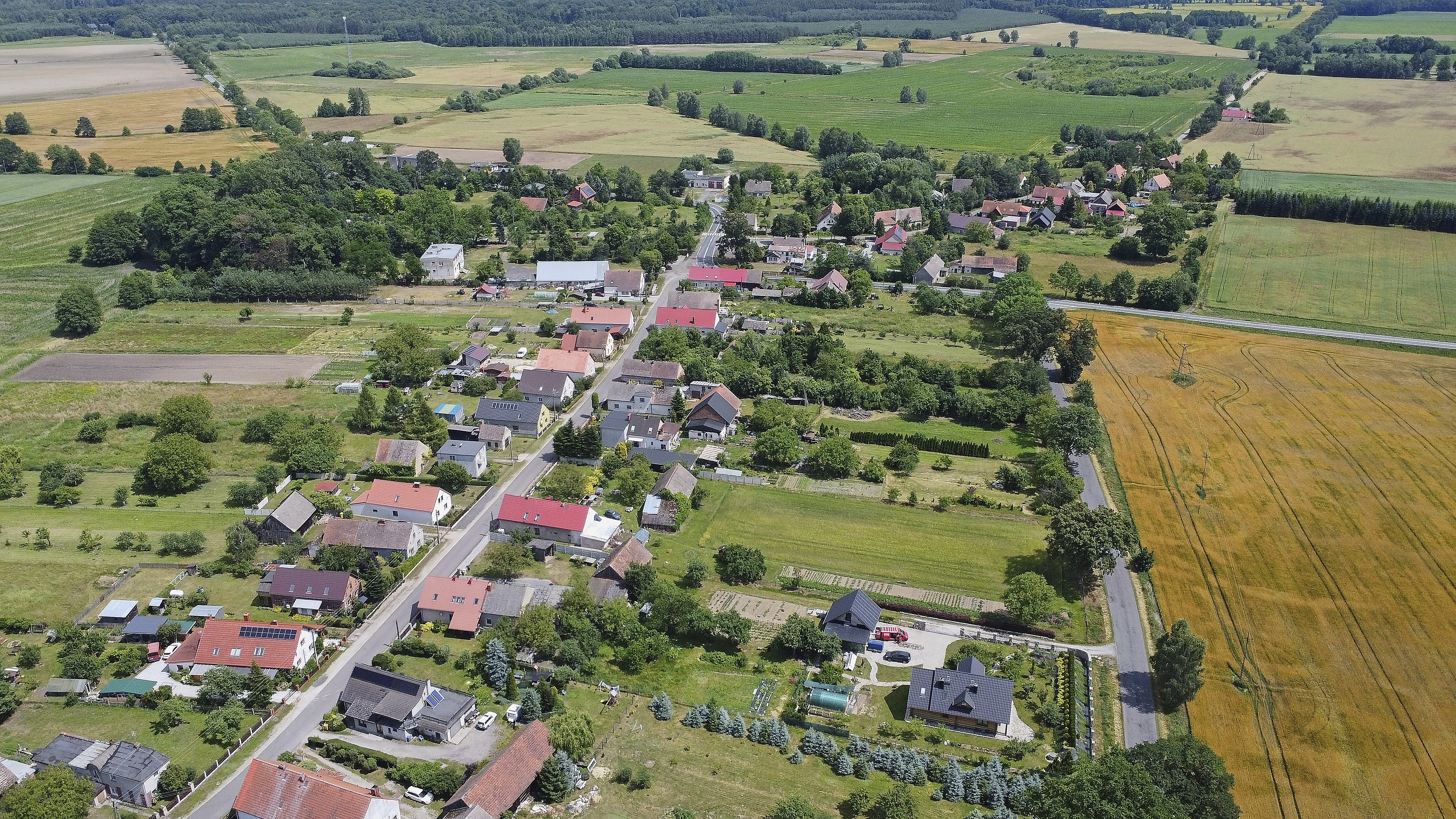

- Location within Poland
- Coordinates: 50°58′N 17°36′E
- Country: Poland
- Voivodeship: Opole
- County: Brzeg
- Gmina: Lubsza
- Elevation: 150 m (490 ft)
- Population: 350

Rogalice [rɔɡaˈlit͡sɛ] is a village in the administrative district of Gmina Lubsza, within Brzeg County, Opole Voivodeship, in south-western Poland.
