= Mąkoszyce, Opole Voivodeship =

Mąkoszyce
- Village
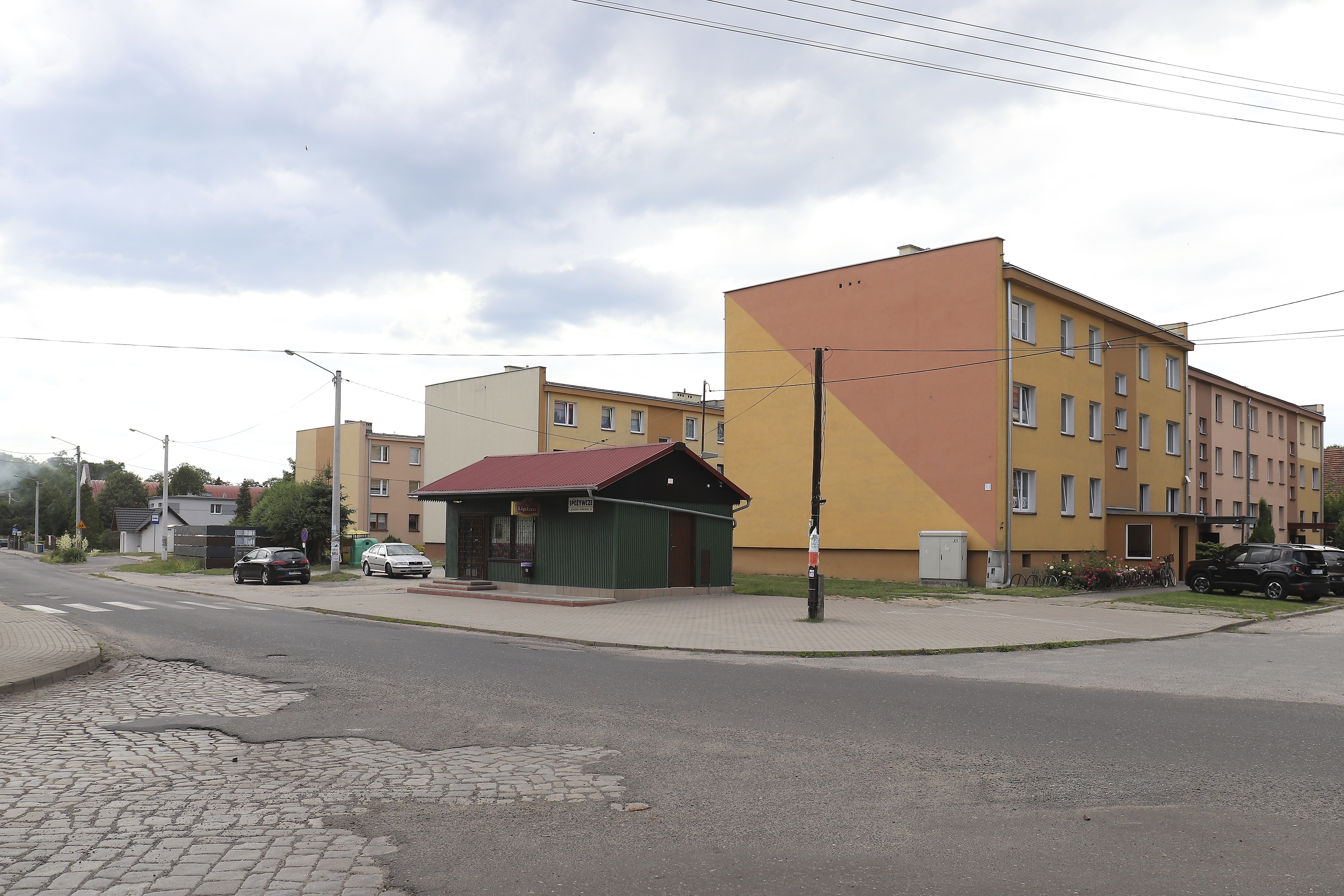

- Location within Poland
- Coordinates: 50°56′21″N 17°38′14″E
- Country: Poland
- Voivodeship: Opole
- County: Brzeg
- Gmina: Lubsza

Mąkoszyce [mɔnkɔˈʂɨt͡sɛ] is a village in the administrative district of Gmina Lubsza, within Brzeg County, Opole Voivodeship, in south-western Poland.
