= Nowy Świat, Opole Voivodeship =

Nowy Świat
- Village
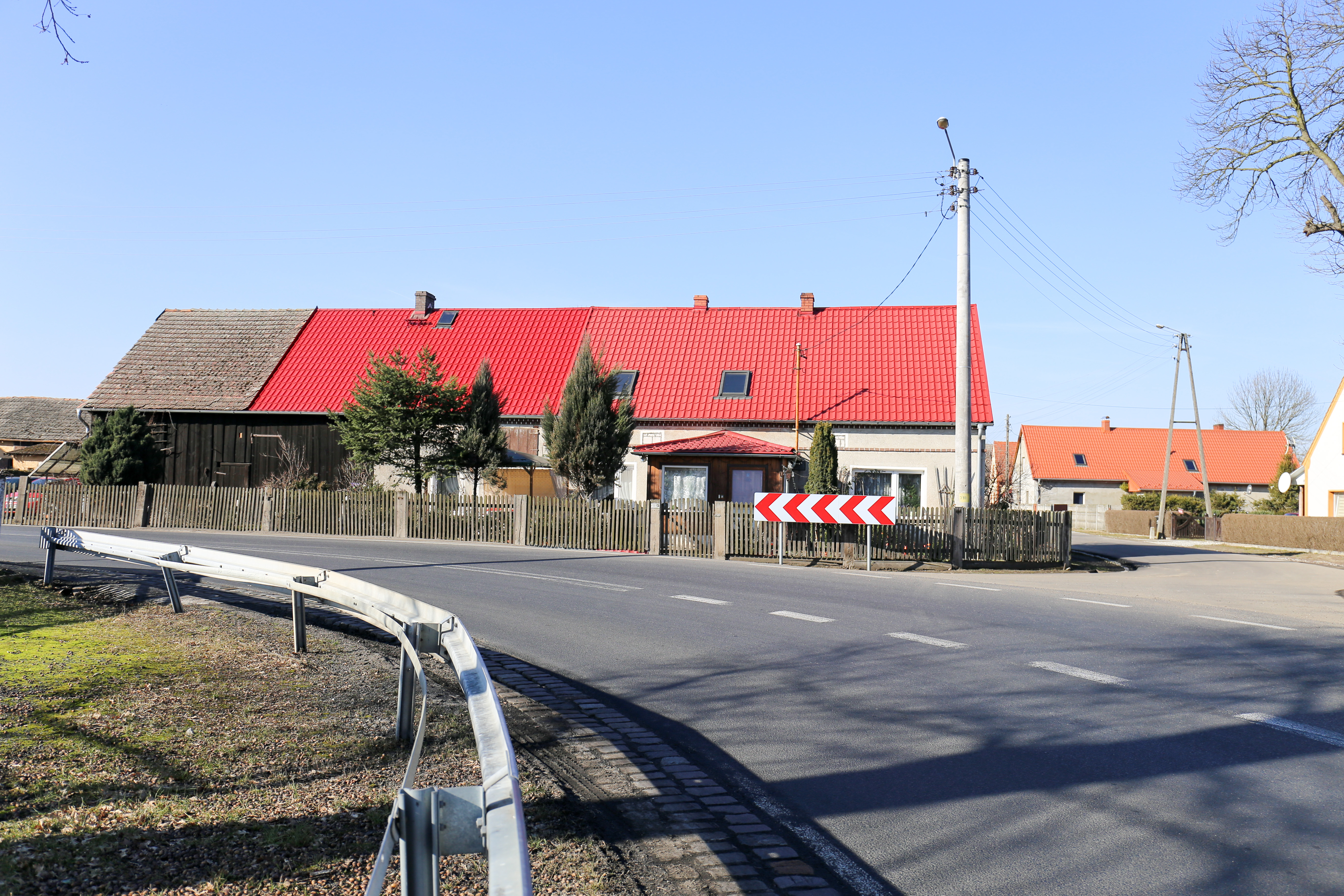

- Location within Poland
- Coordinates: 50°56′N 17°38′E
- Country: Poland
- Voivodeship: Opole
- County: Brzeg
- Gmina: Lubsza

Nowy Świat (Polish: [ˈnɔvɨ ˈɕfjat]) is a village in the administrative district of Gmina Lubsza, within Brzeg County, Opole Voivodeship, in south-western Poland.
