= Stawy, Opole Voivodeship =

Stawy
- Village
- Location within Poland
- Coordinates: 50°53′N 17°36′E
- Country: Poland
- Voivodeship: Opole
- County: Brzeg
- Gmina: Lubsza

Stawy [ˈstavɨ] is a village in the administrative district of Gmina Lubsza, within Brzeg County, Opole Voivodeship, in south-western Poland.
