= Raciszów =

- Village
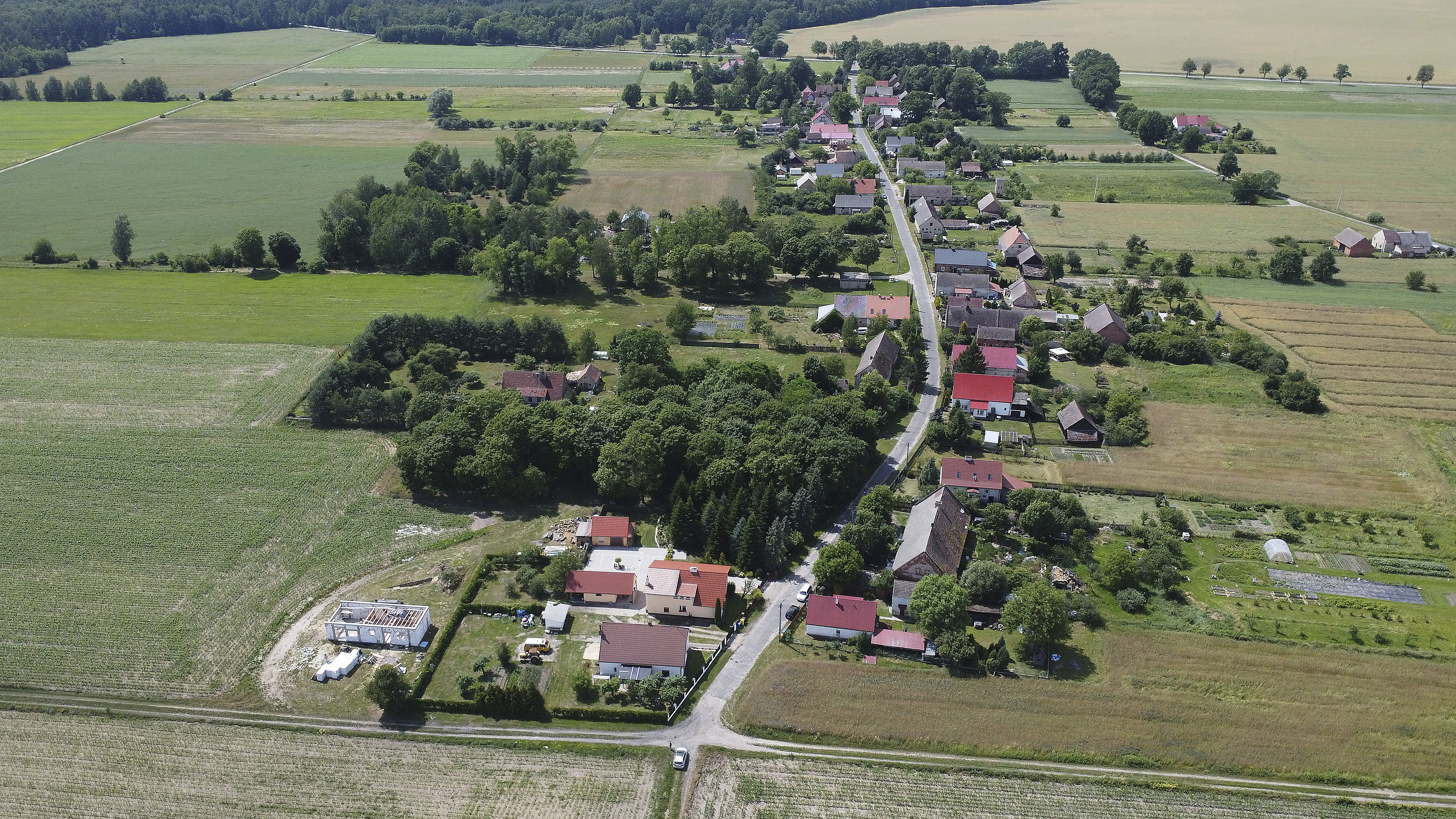

- Location within Poland
- Coordinates: 50°58′39″N 17°38′38″E
- Country: Poland
- Voivodeship: Opole
- County: Brzeg
- Gmina: Lubsza

Raciszów [raˈt͡ɕiʂuf] is a village in the administrative district of Gmina Lubsza, within Brzeg County, Opole Voivodeship, in south-western Poland.
