= Roszkowice =

Roszkowice may refer to the following places:

- Roszkowice, Lubusz Voivodeship (west Poland)
- Roszkowice, Brzeg County in Opole Voivodeship (south-west Poland)
- Roszkowice, Kluczbork County in Opole Voivodeship (south-west Poland)
- Roszkowice, Gmina Niemodlin, Opole County in Opole Voivodeship (south-west Poland)
- Roszkowice, West Pomeranian Voivodeship (north-west Poland)
