= Wójcice =

Wójcice may refer to the following places in Poland:

- Wójcice, Lower Silesian Voivodeship (south-west Poland)
- Wójcice, Łódź Voivodeship (central Poland)
- Wójcice, Opole Voivodeship (south-west Poland)
