= Garbów, Opole Voivodeship =

Garbów
- Village
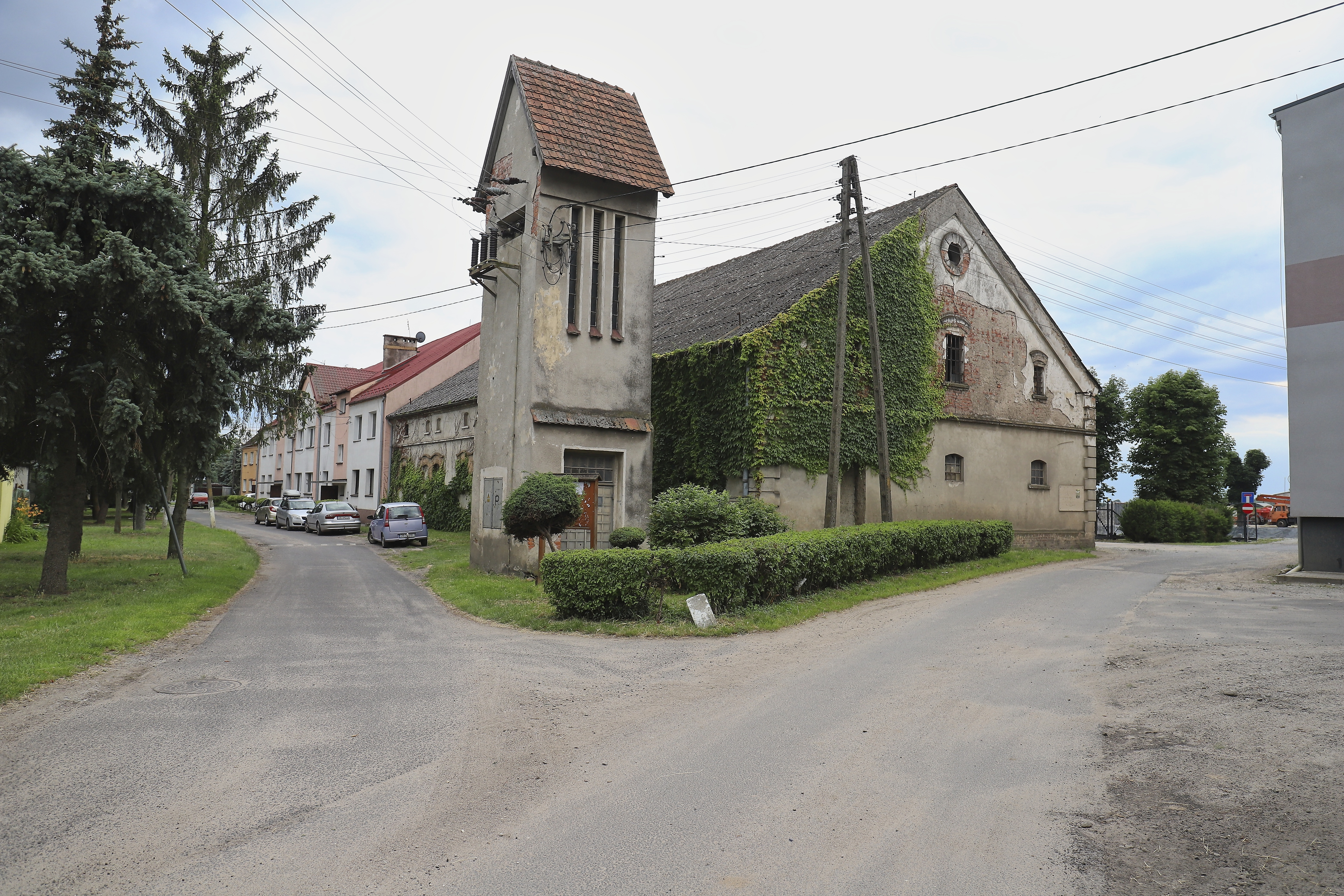

- Location within Poland
- Coordinates: 50°53′N 17°28′E
- Country: Poland
- Voivodeship: Opole
- County: Brzeg
- Gmina: Lubsza
- Elevation: 136 m (446 ft)

Garbów [ˈɡarbuf] is a village in the administrative district of Gmina Lubsza, within Brzeg County, Opole Voivodeship, in south-western Poland.
