= Michałowice, Opole Voivodeship =

Michałowice
- Village
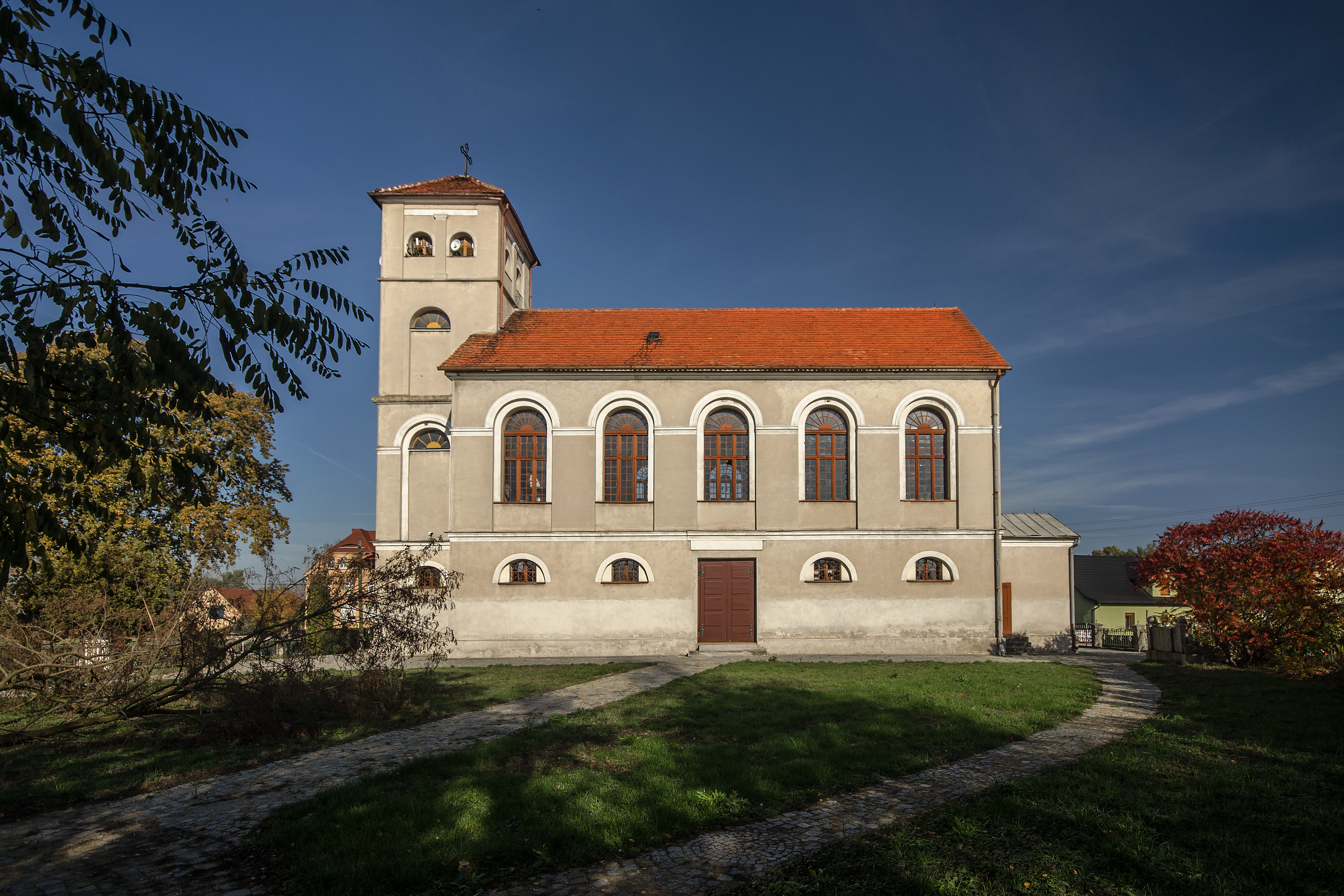
- Catholic church

- Location within Poland
- Coordinates: 50°53′00″N 17°29′00″E
- Country: Poland
- Voivodeship: Opole
- County: Brzeg
- Gmina: Lubsza
- Population: 600

Michałowice [mixawɔˈvit͡sɛ] is a village in the administrative district of Gmina Lubsza, within Brzeg County, Opole Voivodeship, in Southwestern Poland.
