= Złotówka =

- Village
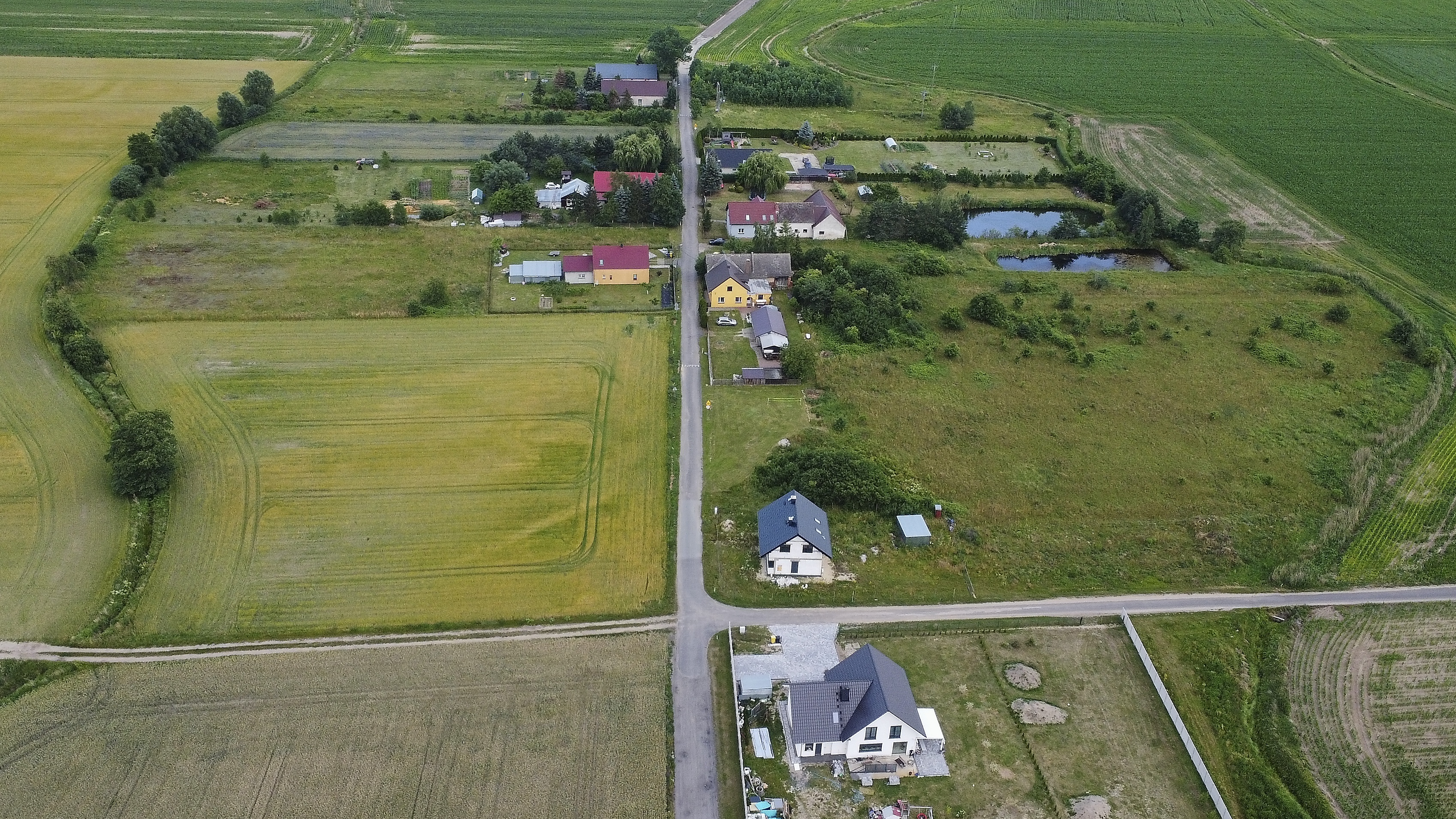

- Location within Poland
- Coordinates: 50°53′N 17°33′E
- Country: Poland
- Voivodeship: Opole
- County: Brzeg
- Gmina: Lubsza

Złotówka [zwɔˈtufka] is a village in the administrative district of Gmina Lubsza, within Brzeg County, Opole Voivodeship, in south-western Poland. The name is also a colloquial name for the Polish one zloty coin.
