= Borucice =

Borucice refers to the following places in Poland:

- Borucice, Łódź Voivodeship
- Borucice, Opole Voivodeship
