= Kościerzyce =

- Village
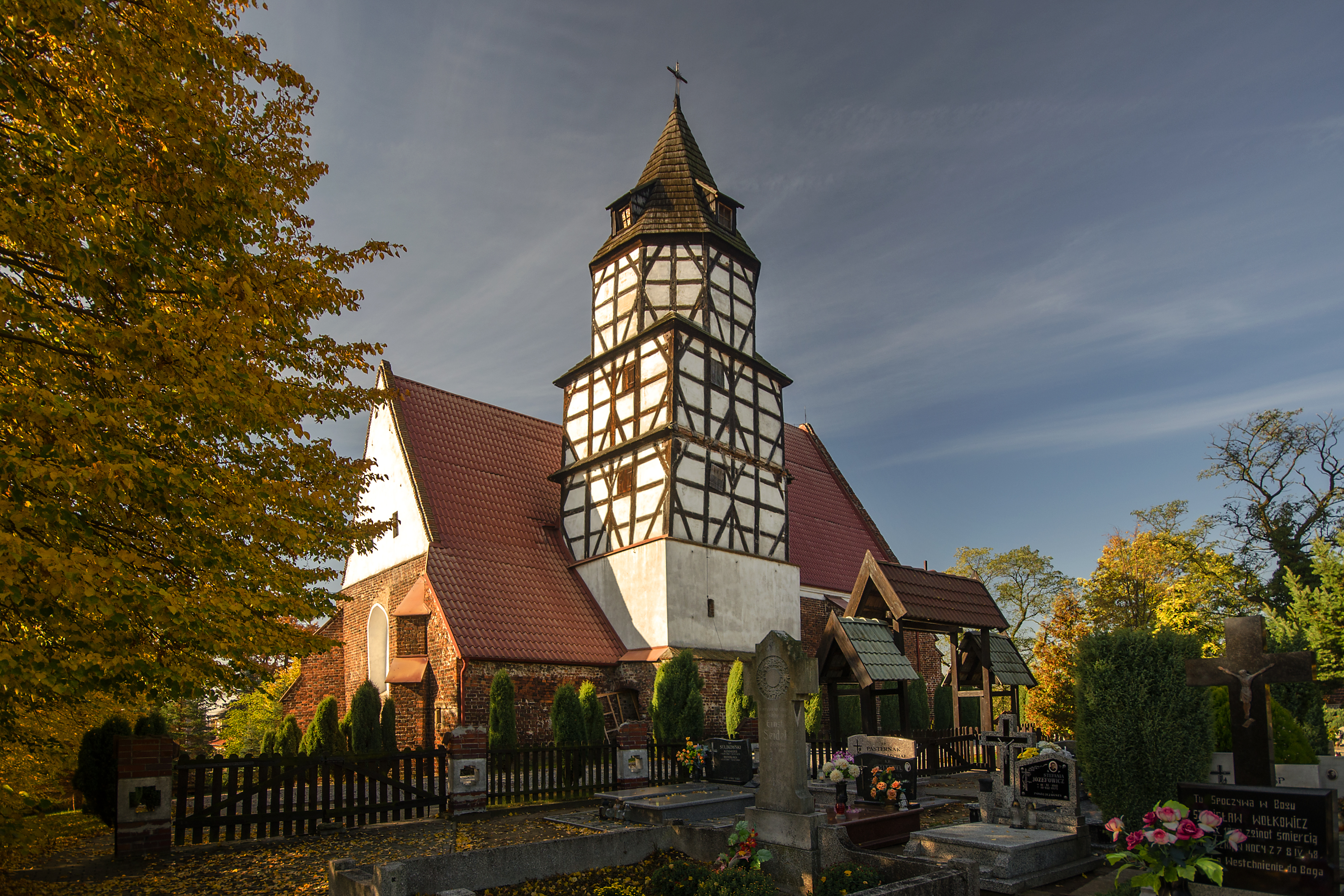
- Church of the Ascension

- Location within Poland
- Coordinates: 50°52′N 17°31′E
- Country: Poland
- Voivodeship: Opole
- County: Brzeg
- Gmina: Lubsza
- Population: 990
- Website: http://koscierzyce.yoyo.pl

Kościerzyce [kɔɕt͡ɕɛˈʐɨt͡sɛ] is a village in the administrative district of Gmina Lubsza, within Brzeg County, Opole Voivodeship, in south-western Poland.
