= Książkowice =

- Village
- Location within Poland
- Coordinates: 50°58′N 17°38′E
- Country: Poland
- Voivodeship: Opole
- County: Brzeg
- Gmina: Lubsza

Książkowice [kɕɔ̃ʂkɔˈvit͡sɛ] is a village in the administrative district of Gmina Lubsza, within Brzeg County, Opole Voivodeship, in south-western Poland.
