= Zamcze =

- Village
- Location within Poland
- Coordinates: 50°56′39″N 17°27′19″E
- Country: Poland
- Voivodeship: Opole
- County: Brzeg
- Gmina: Lubsza

Zamcze [ˈzamt͡ʂɛ] is a village in the administrative district of Gmina Lubsza, within Brzeg County, Opole Voivodeship, in south-western Poland.
