= Szydłowice =

- Village
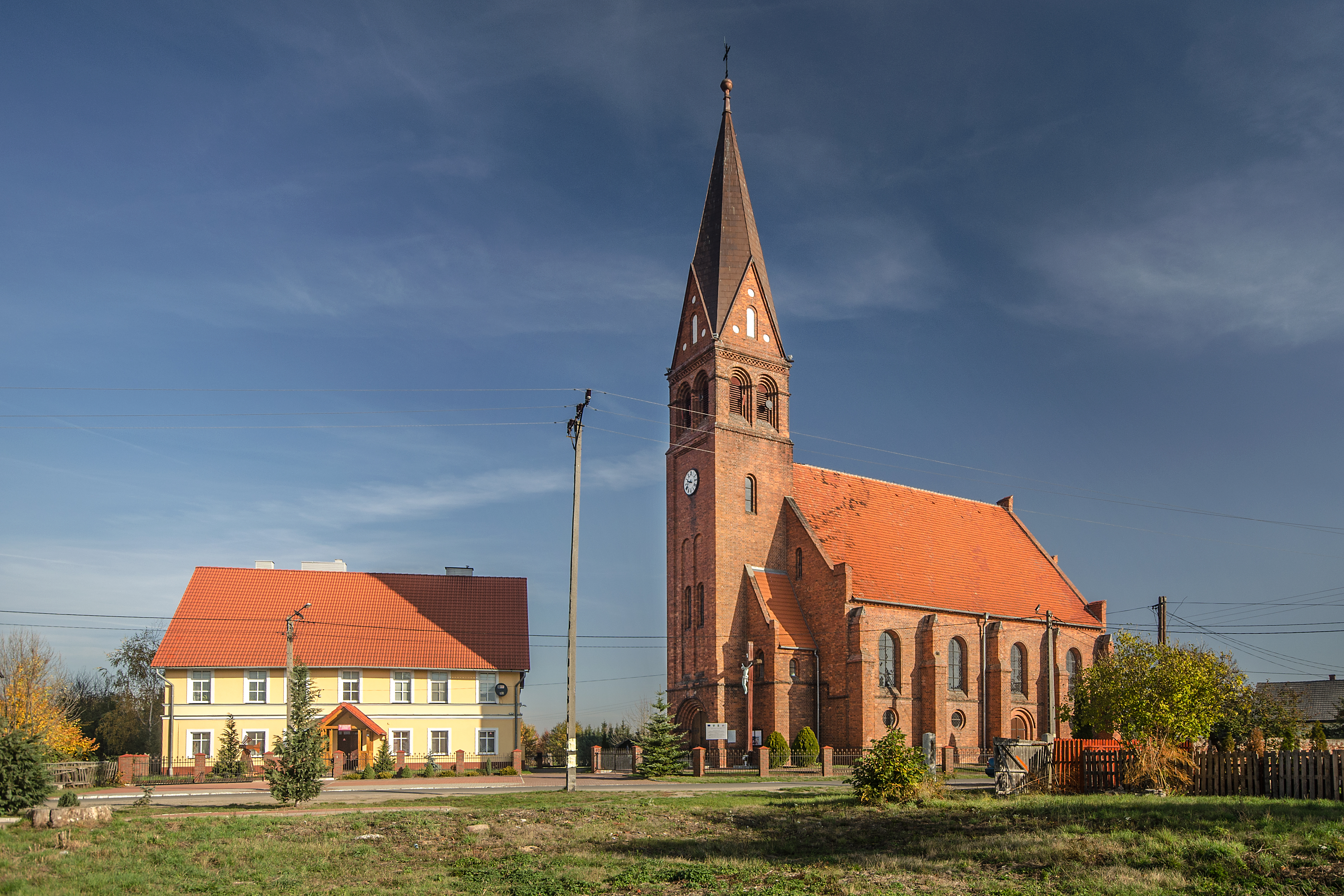
- St. Bartholomew's Church

- Location within Poland
- Coordinates: 50°55′N 17°28′E
- Country: Poland
- Voivodeship: Opole
- County: Brzeg
- Gmina: Lubsza

Szydłowice [ʂɨdwɔˈvit͡sɛ] is a village in the administrative district of Gmina Lubsza, within Brzeg County, Opole Voivodeship, in south-western Poland.
