= Tarnowiec, Opole Voivodeship =

Tarnowiec
- Village
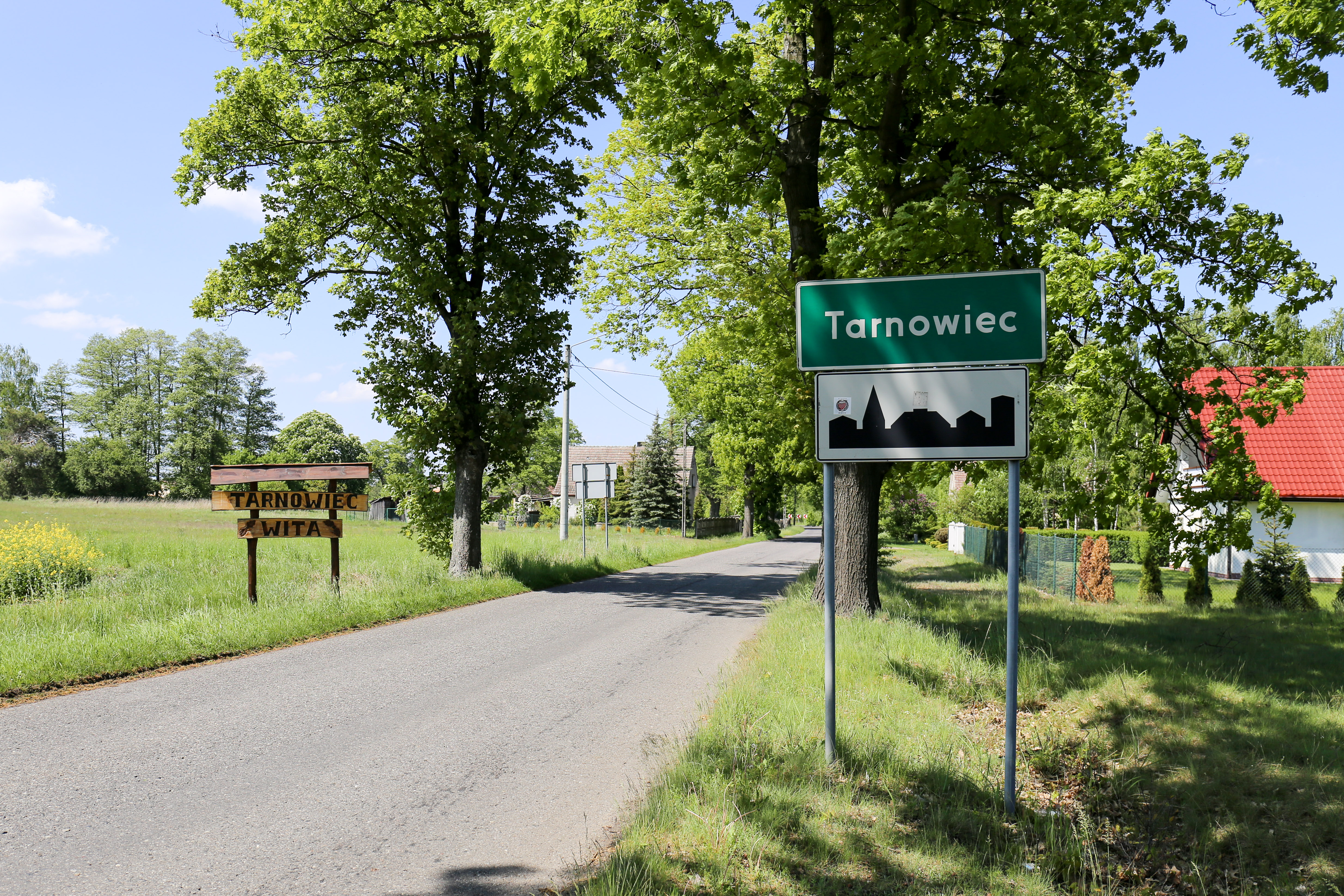

- Location within Poland
- Coordinates: 50°55′N 17°39′E
- Country: Poland
- Voivodeship: Opole
- County: Brzeg
- Gmina: Lubsza

Tarnowiec [tarˈnɔvjɛt͡s] is a village in the administrative district of Gmina Lubsza, within Brzeg County, Opole Voivodeship, in south-western Poland.
