= Borek, Brzeg County =

Borek
- Village
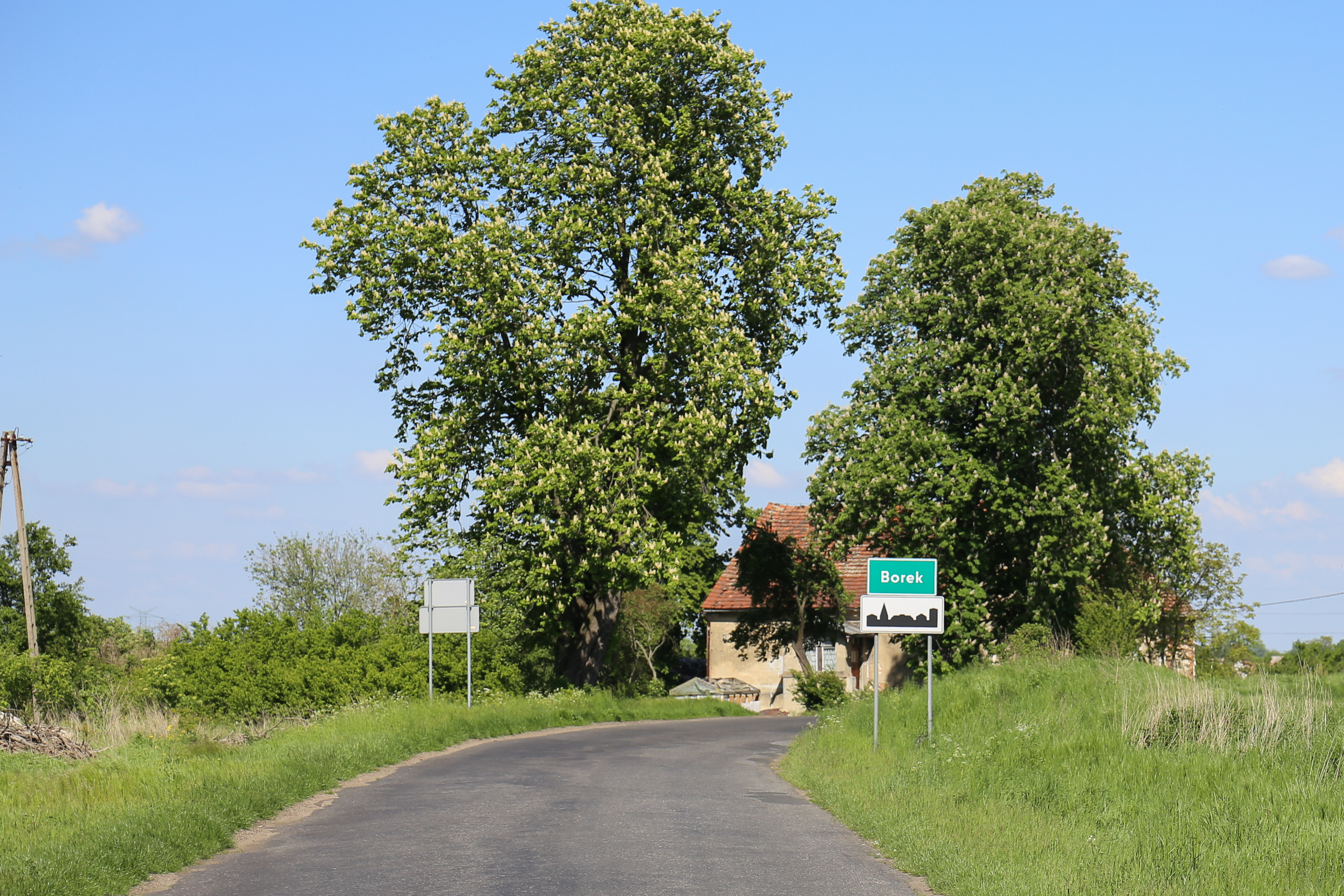

- Location within Poland
- Coordinates: 50°56′36″N 17°40′02″E
- Country: Poland
- Voivodeship: Opole
- County: Brzeg
- Gmina: Lubsza

Borek [ˈbɔrɛk] is a village in the administrative district of Gmina Lubsza, within Brzeg County, Opole Voivodeship, in south-western Poland.
