= Lubicz =

Lubicz may refer to the following places:

- Lubicz, Kuyavian-Pomeranian Voivodeship (north-central Poland)
- Lubicz, Lubusz Voivodeship (west Poland)
- Lubicz, Opole Voivodeship (south-west Poland)
- Lubicz, West Pomeranian Voivodeship (north-west Poland)

Lubicz can also refer to the Lubicz coat of arms.
