= Kopalina, Brzeg County =

Kopalina
- Village
- Location within Poland
- Coordinates: 50°54′32″N 17°41′05″E
- Country: Poland
- Voivodeship: Opole
- County: Brzeg
- Gmina: Lubsza

Kopalina [kɔpaˈlina] is a village in the administrative district of Gmina Lubsza, within Brzeg County, Opole Voivodeship, in south-western Poland.
