= Borucice, Opole Voivodeship =

Borucice
- Village
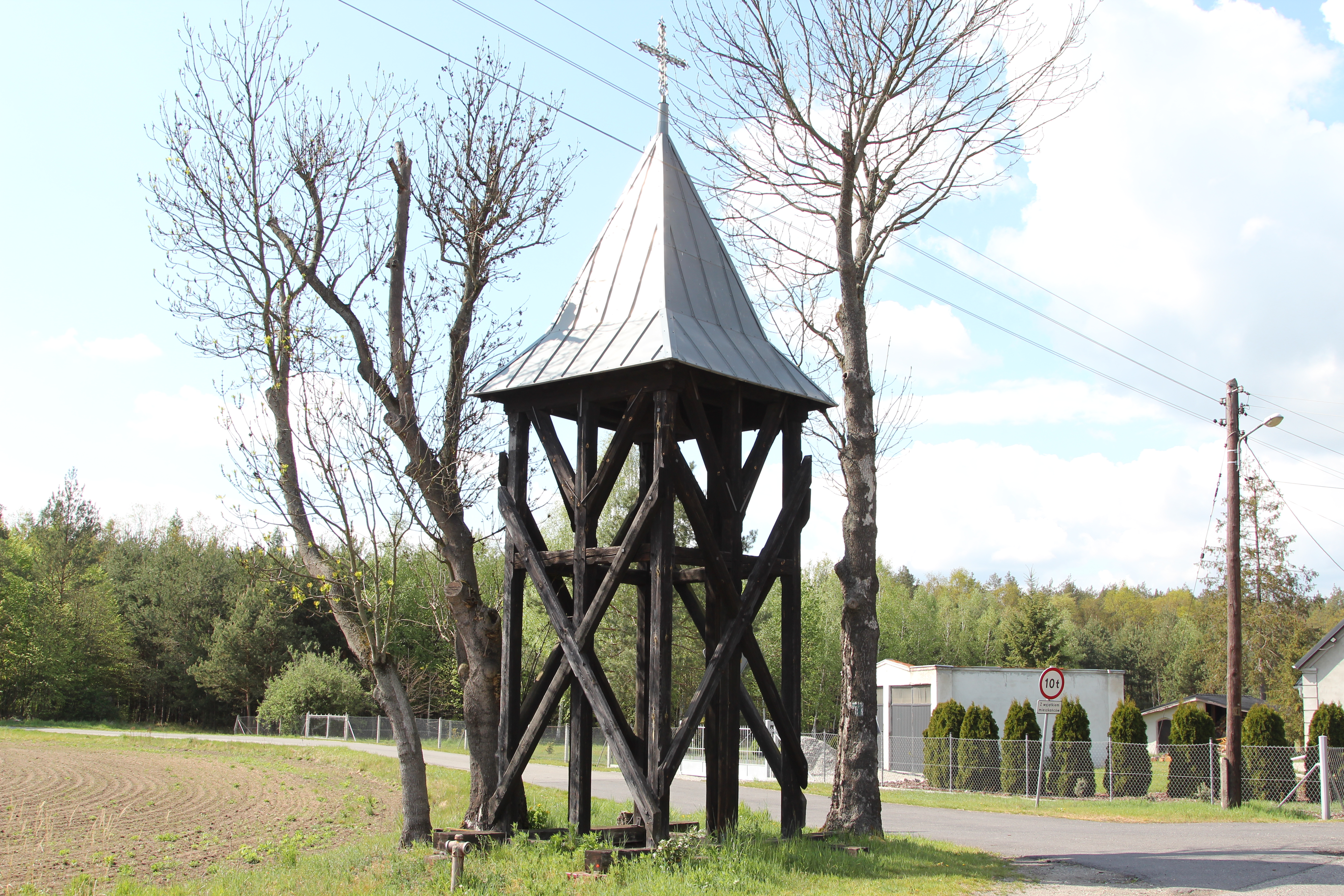

- Location within Poland
- Coordinates: 50°58′51″N 17°33′31″E
- Country: Poland
- Voivodeship: Opole
- County: Brzeg
- Gmina: Lubsza

Borucice [bɔruˈt͡ɕit͡sɛ] is a village in the administrative district of Gmina Lubsza, within Brzeg County, Opole Voivodeship, in south-western Poland.
