= Dziuplina =

- Village
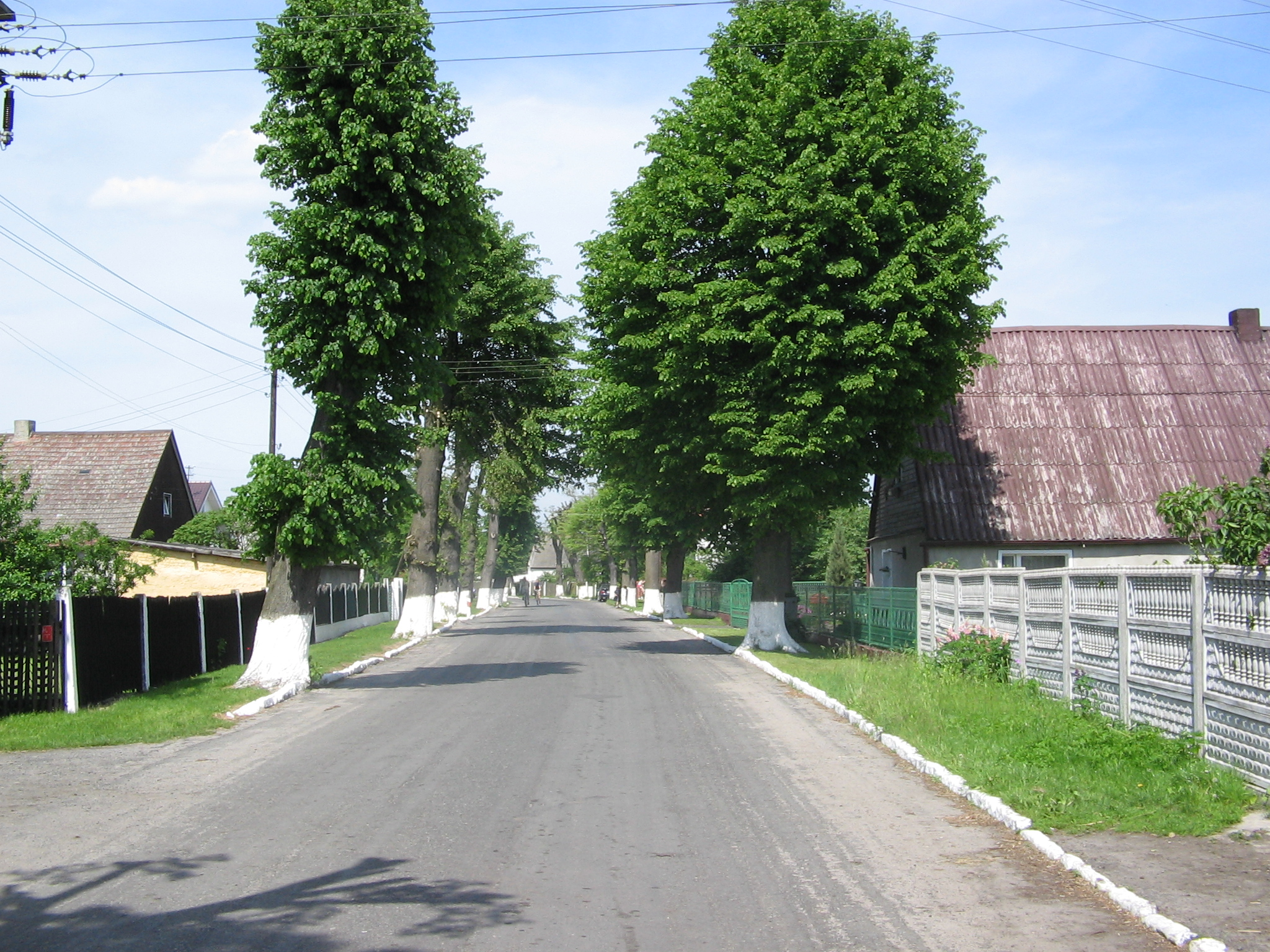

- Location within Poland
- Coordinates: 51°4′N 17°20′E
- Country: Poland
- Voivodeship: Lower Silesian
- County: Oława
- Gmina: Jelcz-Laskowice
- Population: 336

Dziuplina [d͡ʑuˈplina] is a village in the administrative district of Gmina Jelcz-Laskowice, within Oława County, Lower Silesian Voivodeship, in south-western Poland.
