= Boruta (surname) =

Boruta or Bořuta is a surname. Notable people with the surname include:

- Antonín Bořuta (born 1988), Czech ice hockey player
- Jonas Algimantas Boruta (1944–2022), Lithuanian Catholic bishop
- Kazys Boruta (1905–1965), Lithuanian writer and poet
- Mieczysław Boruta-Spiechowicz (1894–1985), Polish military officer

== See also ==
- Boruta (disambiguation)
- Boruth
