= Biskupice Oławskie =

- Village
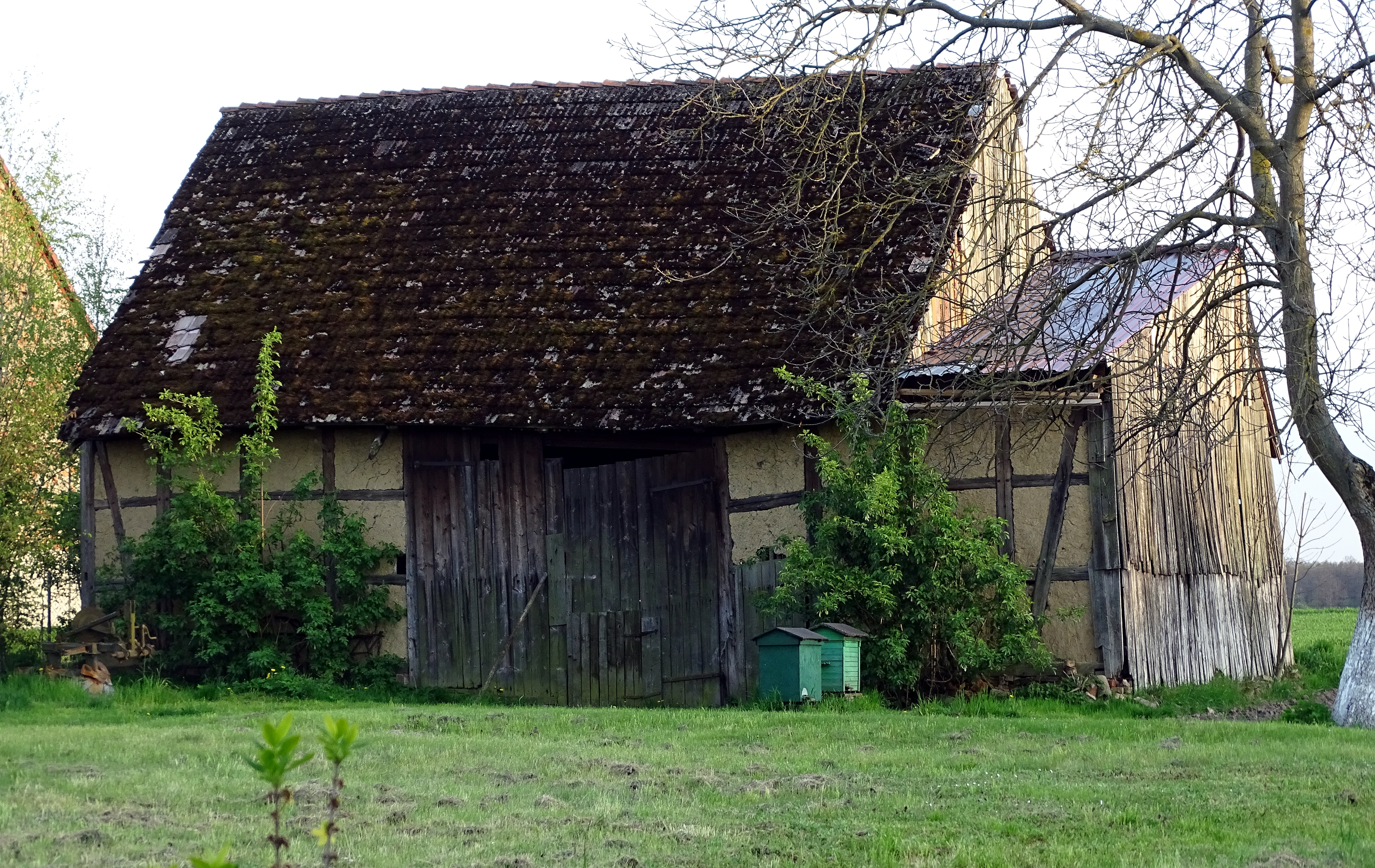
- Old homestead in the village

- Location within Poland
- Coordinates: 50°59′50″N 17°31′00″E
- Country: Poland
- Voivodeship: Lower Silesian
- County: Oława
- Gmina: Jelcz-Laskowice

Biskupice Oławskie [biskuˈpit͡sɛ ɔˈwafskʲɛ] (German: Bischwitz) is a village in the administrative district of Gmina Jelcz-Laskowice, within Oława County, Lower Silesian Voivodeship, in south-western Poland.
