= Chwałowice, Lower Silesian Voivodeship =

Chwałowice
- Village
- Location within Poland
- Coordinates: 51°02′35″N 17°22′49″E
- Country: Poland
- Voivodeship: Lower Silesian
- County: Oława
- Gmina: Jelcz-Laskowice

Chwałowice [xfawɔˈvit͡sɛ] is a village in the administrative district of Gmina Jelcz-Laskowice, within Oława County, Lower Silesian Voivodeship, in south-western Poland.
