= Minkowice Oławskie =

- Village
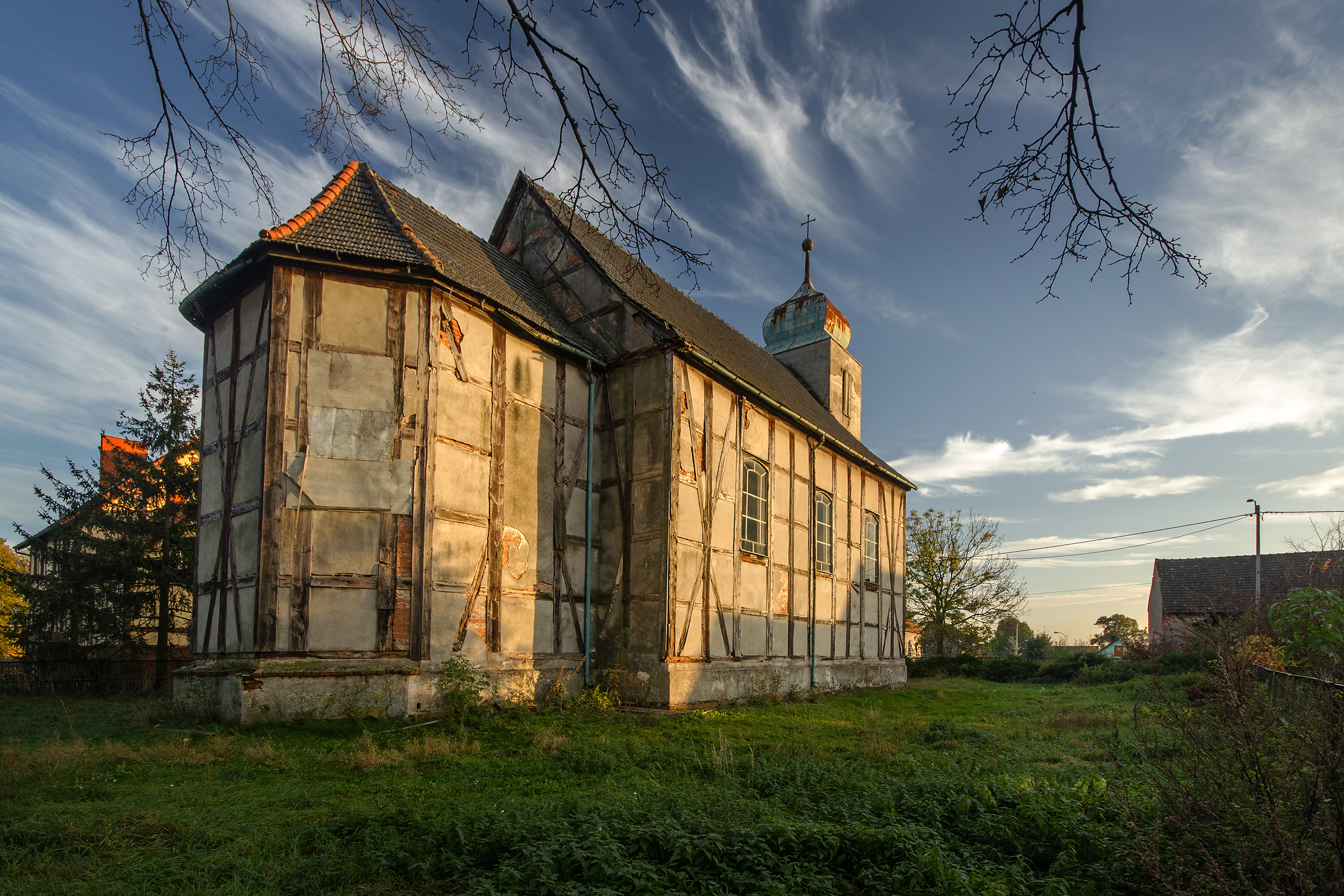
- Church of Saint John of Nepomuk

- Location within Poland
- Coordinates: 51°1′N 17°28′E
- Country: Poland
- Voivodeship: Lower Silesian
- County: Oława
- Gmina: Jelcz-Laskowice

Minkowice Oławskie [miŋkɔˈvit͡sɛ ɔˈwafskʲɛ] is a village in the administrative district of Gmina Jelcz-Laskowice, within Oława County, Lower Silesian Voivodeship, in south-western Poland.
