= Piekary, Oława County =

Piekary
- Village
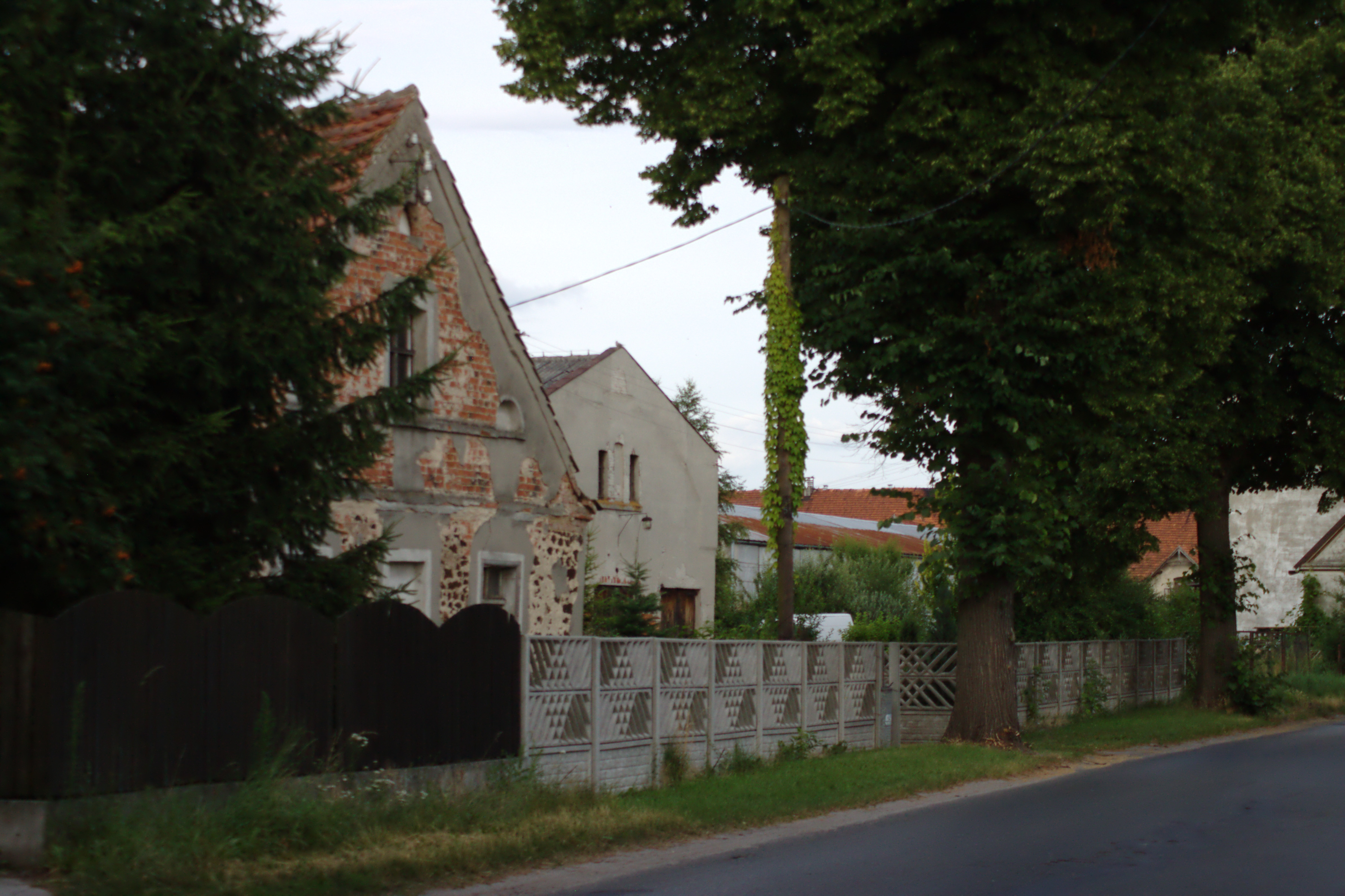

- Location within Poland
- Coordinates: 51°1′52″N 17°22′3″E
- Country: Poland
- Voivodeship: Lower Silesian
- County: Oława
- Gmina: Jelcz-Laskowice
- Population: 470

Piekary [pjɛˈkarɨ] is a village in the administrative district of Gmina Jelcz-Laskowice, within Oława County, Lower Silesian Voivodeship, in south-western Poland.
