= Roszkowice, Brzeg County =

Roszkowice
- Village
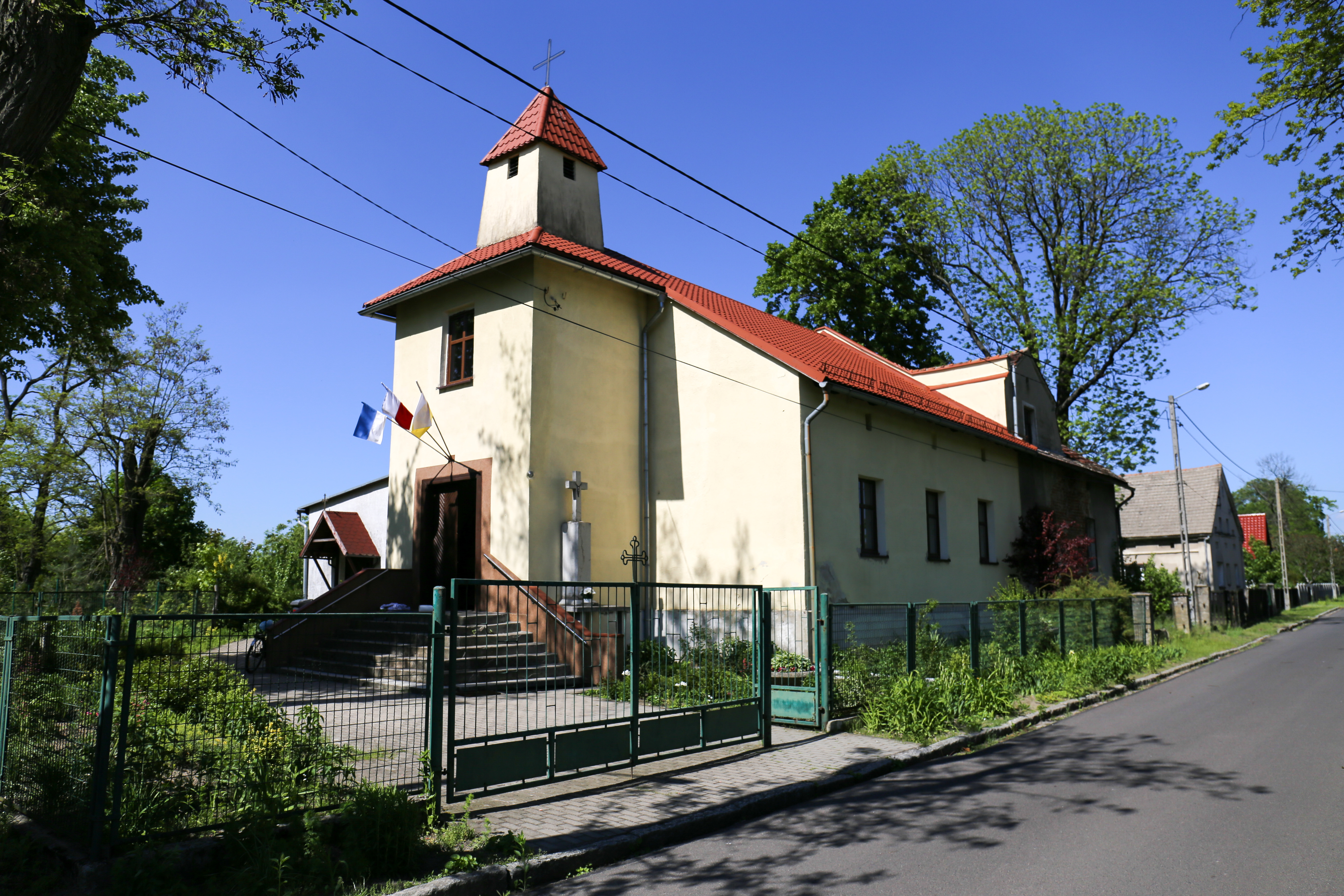
- Catholic church

- Location within Poland
- Coordinates: 50°54′51″N 17°40′36″E
- Country: Poland
- Voivodeship: Opole
- County: Brzeg
- Gmina: Lubsza

Roszkowice [rɔʂkɔˈvit͡sɛ] is a village in the administrative district of Gmina Lubsza, within Brzeg County, Opole Voivodeship, in south-western Poland.
