= Nowy Dwór, Oława County =

Nowy Dwór
- Village
- Location within Poland
- Coordinates: 51°1′2″N 17°22′8″E
- Country: Poland
- Voivodeship: Lower Silesian
- County: Oława
- Gmina: Jelcz-Laskowice

Nowy Dwór [ˈnɔvɨ ˈdvur] is a village in the administrative district of Gmina Jelcz-Laskowice, within Oława County, Lower Silesian Voivodeship, in south-western Poland.
