= Pisarzowice, Brzeg County =

Pisarzowice
- Village
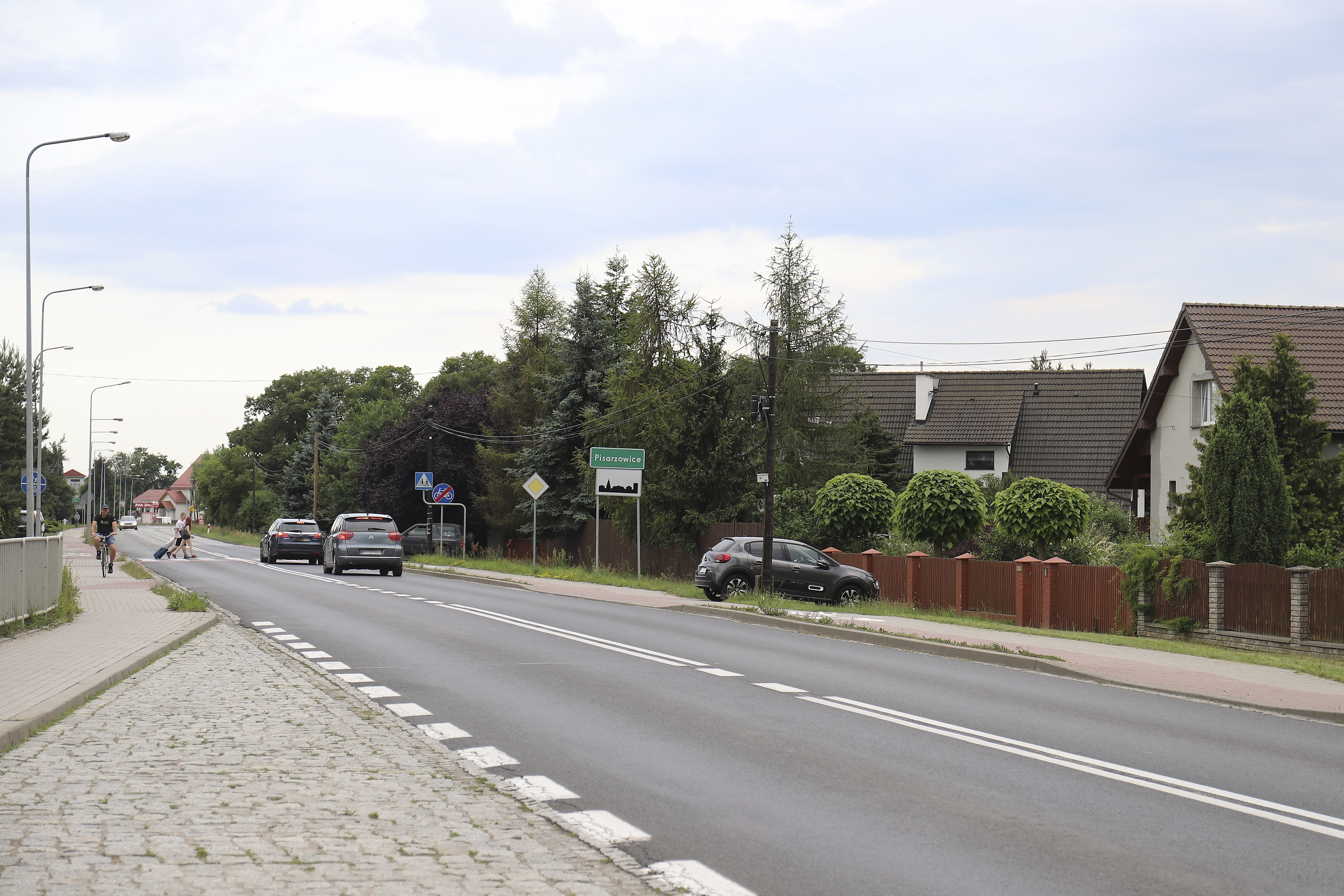

- Location within Poland
- Coordinates: 50°52′N 17°29′E
- Country: Poland
- Voivodeship: Opole
- County: Brzeg
- Gmina: Lubsza

Pisarzowice [pisaʐɔˈvit͡sɛ] is a village in the administrative district of Gmina Lubsza, within Brzeg County, Opole Voivodeship, in south-western Poland.
