= Grędzina =

- Village
- Location within Poland
- Coordinates: 51°05′22″N 17°25′15″E
- Country: Poland
- Voivodeship: Lower Silesian
- County: Oława
- Gmina: Jelcz-Laskowice

Grędzina [ɡrɛnˈd͡ʑina] is a village in the administrative district of Gmina Jelcz-Laskowice, within Oława County, Lower Silesian Voivodeship, in south-western Poland.
