= Brzezinki, Lower Silesian Voivodeship =

Brzezinki
- Village
- Location within Poland
- Coordinates: 51°05′20″N 17°21′06″E
- Country: Poland
- Voivodeship: Lower Silesian
- County: Oława
- Gmina: Jelcz-Laskowice
- Time zone: UTC+1 (CET)
  - Summer (DST): UTC+2 (CEST)
- Vehicle registration: DOA

Brzezinki [bʐɛˈʑinki] is a village in the administrative district of Gmina Jelcz-Laskowice, within Oława County, Lower Silesian Voivodeship, in south-western Poland.

== History ==
The area became part of the emerging Polish state in the 10th century. Centuries later it passed to Bohemia (Czechia), Prussia and Germany. It became again part of Poland following Germany's defeat in World War II in 1945.
