= Lubicz, Opole Voivodeship =

Lubicz
- Village
- Location within Poland
- Coordinates: 50°55′N 17°35′E
- Country: Poland
- Voivodeship: Opole
- County: Brzeg
- Gmina: Lubsza

Lubicz [ˈlubit͡ʂ] is a village in the administrative district of Gmina Lubsza, within Brzeg County, Opole Voivodeship, in south-western Poland.
