= Lubsza, Opole Voivodeship =

Lubsza
- Village
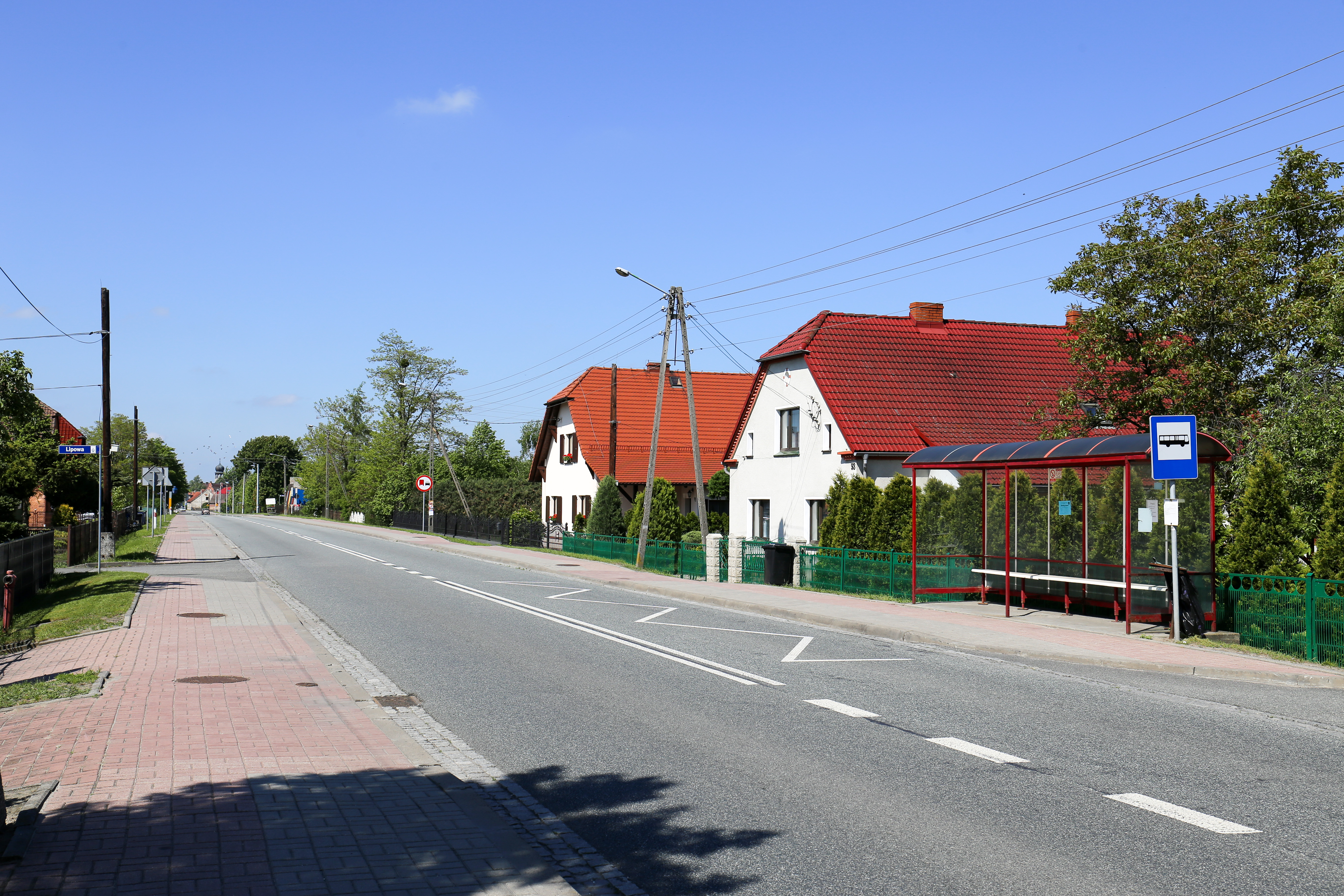

- Location within Poland
- Coordinates: 50°55′00″N 17°31′08″E
- Country: Poland
- Voivodeship: Opole
- County: Brzeg
- Gmina: Lubsza

Lubsza [ˈlupʂa] is a village in Brzeg County, Opole Voivodeship, in south-western Poland. It is the seat of the gmina (administrative district) called Gmina Lubsza.
