= Gmina Jelcz-Laskowice =

Gmina Jelcz-Laskowice Jelcz-Laskowice Commune
- Gmina
- Coat of arms
- Interactive map of Gmina Jelcz-Laskowice
- Coordinates (Jelcz-Laskowice): 51°02′N 17°20′E
- Country: Poland
- Voivodeship: Lower Silesian
- County: Oława
- Seat: Jelcz-Laskowice

Area
  - Total: 168.1 km^{2} (64.9 sq mi)

Population (2019-06-30)
  - Total: 23,323
  - Density: 138.7/km^{2} (359.3/sq mi)
  - Urban: 15,803
  - Rural: 7,520
- Website: http://www.jelcz-laskowice.pl/

Gmina Jelcz-Laskowice is an urban-rural gmina (administrative district) in Oława County, Lower Silesian Voivodeship, in south-western Poland. Its seat is the town of Jelcz-Laskowice, which lies approximately 12 kilometres (7 mi) north of Oława, and 24 kilometres (15 mi) south-east of the regional capital Wrocław. It is part of the Wrocław metropolitan area.

The gmina covers an area of 168.1 square kilometres (64.9 sq mi), and as of 2019 its total population was 23,323.

== Neighbouring gminas ==
Gmina Jelcz-Laskowice is bordered by the town of Oława and the gminas of Bierutów, Czernica, Lubsza, Namysłów, Oława and Oleśnica.

== Villages ==
Apart from the town of Jelcz-Laskowice, the gmina contains the villages of Biskupice Oławskie, Brzezinki, Chwałowice, Dębina, Dziuplina, Grędzina, Kopalina, Łęg, Miłocice, Miłocice Małe, Miłoszyce, Minkowice Oławskie, Nowy Dwór, Piekary and Wójcice.

== Twin towns – sister cities ==
Gmina Jelcz-Laskowice is twinned with:

- Gudensberg, Germany
- Rtyně v Podkrkonoší, Czech Republic
- Shchyrets, Ukraine
