= Miłocice Małe =

- Village
- Location within Poland
- Coordinates: 51°2′24″N 17°25′38″E
- Country: Poland
- Voivodeship: Lower Silesian
- County: Oława
- Gmina: Jelcz-Laskowice

Miłocice Małe [miwɔˈt͡ɕit͡sɛ ˈmawɛ] is a village in the administrative district of Gmina Jelcz-Laskowice, within Oława County, Lower Silesian Voivodeship, in south-western Poland.
