= Miłocice, Oława County =

Miłocice
- Village
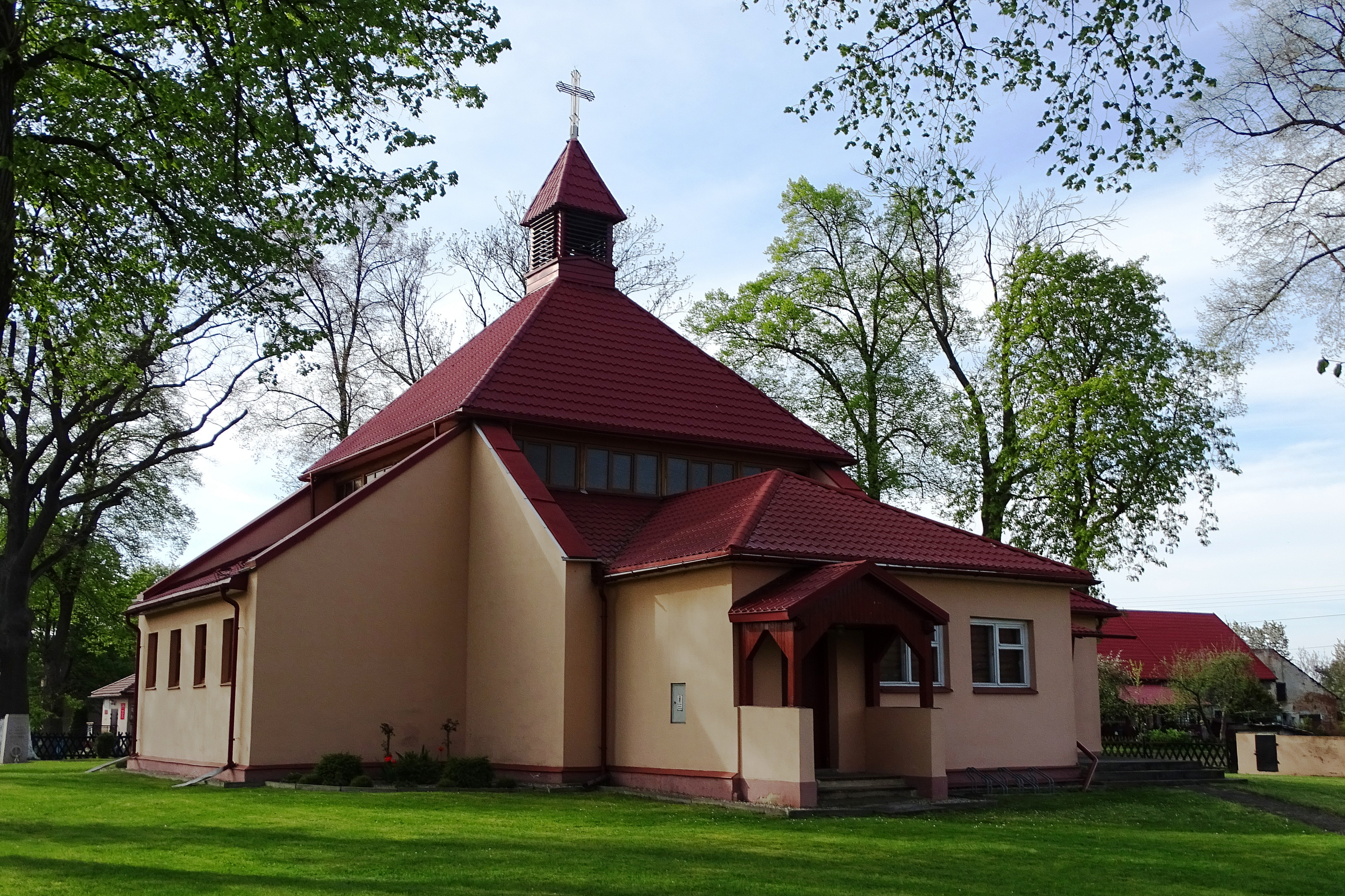
- Catholic church

- Location within Poland
- Coordinates: 51°3′N 17°29′E
- Country: Poland
- Voivodeship: Lower Silesian
- County: Oława
- Gmina: Jelcz-Laskowice

Miłocice [miwɔˈt͡ɕit͡sɛ] is a village in the administrative district of Gmina Jelcz-Laskowice, within Oława County, Lower Silesian Voivodeship, in south-western Poland.
