= Gmina Lubsza =

Gmina Lubsza Lubsza Commune
- Gmina
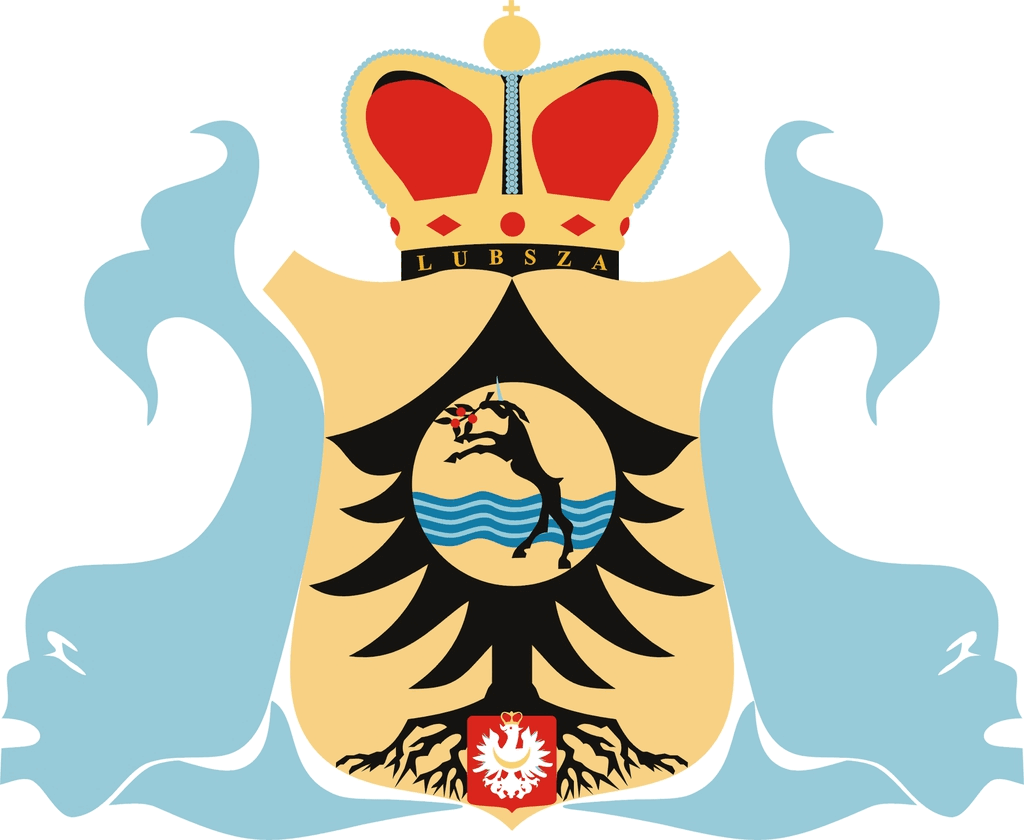
- Flag Coat of arms
- Interactive map of Gmina Lubsza
- Coordinates (Lubsza): 50°55′N 17°31′E
- Country: Poland
- Voivodeship: Opole
- County: Brzeg
- Seat: Lubsza

Area
  - Total: 212.71 km^{2} (82.13 sq mi)

Population (2019-06-30)
  - Total: 8,992
  - Density: 42.27/km^{2} (109.5/sq mi)
- Website: http://lubsza.ug.gov.pl

Gmina Lubsza is a rural gmina (administrative district) in Brzeg County, Opole Voivodeship, in south-western Poland. Its seat is the village of Lubsza, which lies approximately 7 kilometres (4 mi) north-east of Brzeg and 41 km (25 mi) north-west of the regional capital Opole.

The gmina covers an area of 212.71 square kilometres (82.1 sq mi), and as of 2019 its total population was 8,992.

The gmina contains part of the protected area called Stobrawa Landscape Park.

== Villages ==
Gmina Lubsza contains the villages and settlements of Błota, Borek, Borucice, Boruta, Czepielowice, Dobrzyń, Garbów, Kopalina, Kościerzyce, Książkowice, Lednica, Leśna Woda, Lubicz, Lubsza, Mąkoszyce, Michałowice, Myśliborzyce, Nowe Kolnie, Nowy Świat, Piastowice, Pisarzowice, Raciszów, Rogalice, Roszkowice, Śmiechowice, Stawy, Szydłowice, Tarnowiec, Zamcze and Złotówka.

== Neighbouring gminas ==
Gmina Lubsza is bordered by the town of Brzeg and by the gminas of Jelcz-Laskowice, Namysłów, Oława, Popielów, Skarbimierz and Świerczów.
