= Boruta, Opole Voivodeship =

Boruta
- Village
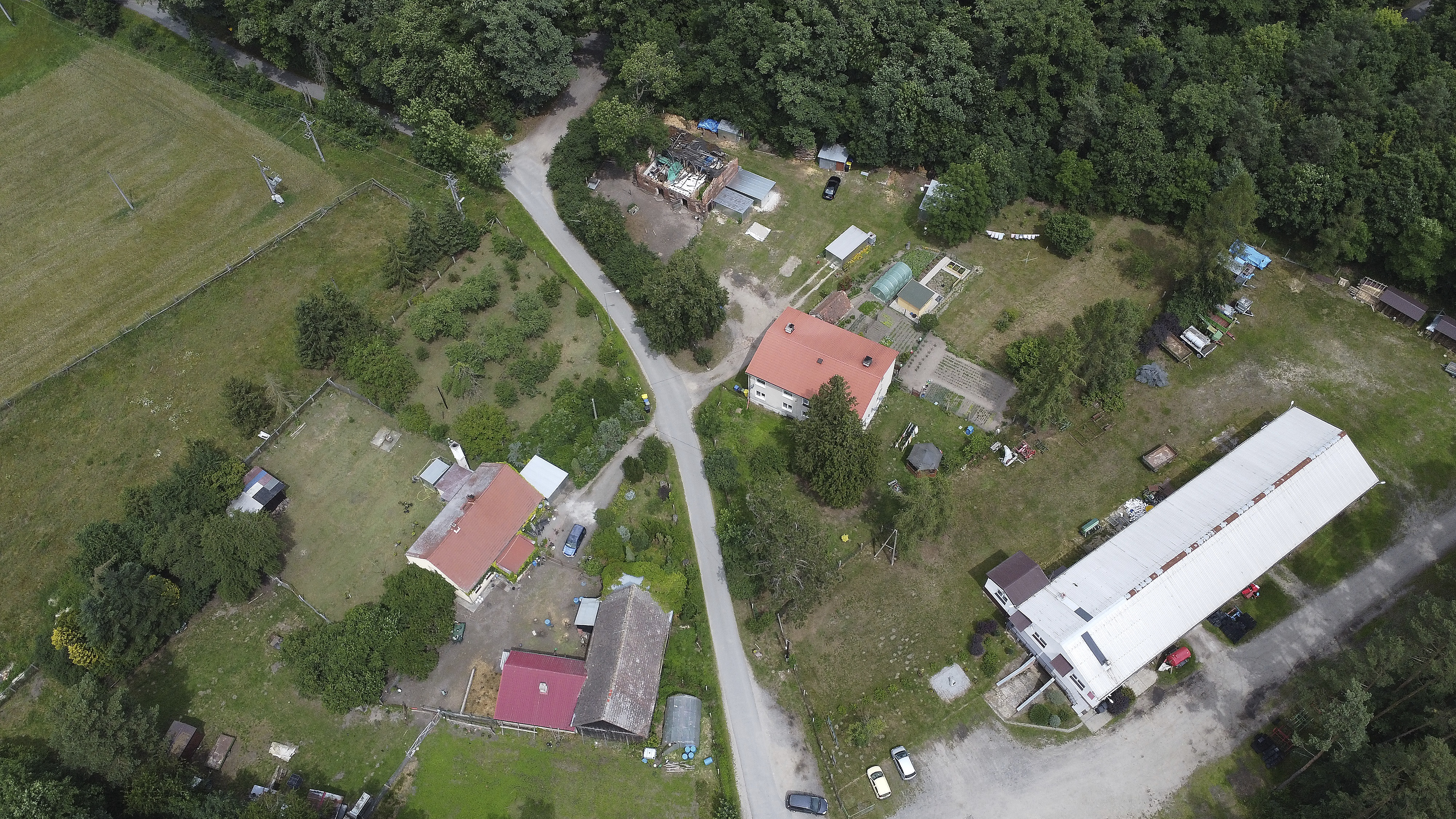

- Location within Poland
- Coordinates: 50°58′N 17°34′E
- Country: Poland
- Voivodeship: Opole
- County: Brzeg
- Gmina: Lubsza

Boruta [bɔˈruta] is a village in the administrative district of Gmina Lubsza, within Brzeg County, Opole Voivodeship, in south-western Poland.
