= Dębina, Lower Silesian Voivodeship =

Dębina
- Village
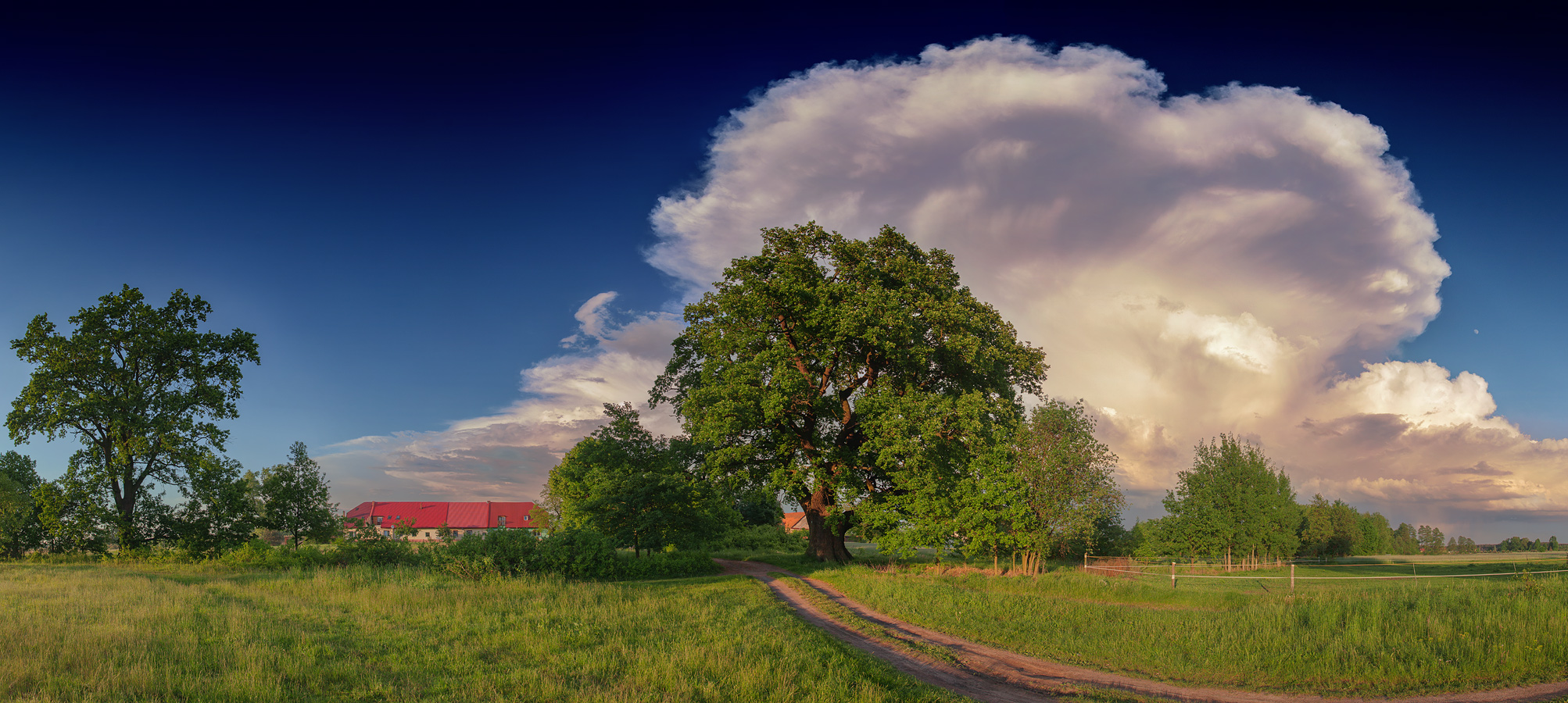

- Location within Poland
- Coordinates: 51°03′20″N 17°23′12″E
- Country: Poland
- Voivodeship: Lower Silesian
- County: Oława
- Gmina: Jelcz-Laskowice

Dębina [dɛmˈbina] is a village in the administrative district of Gmina Jelcz-Laskowice, within Oława County, Lower Silesian Voivodeship, in south-western Poland.
