= Błota, Opole Voivodeship =

Błota
- Village
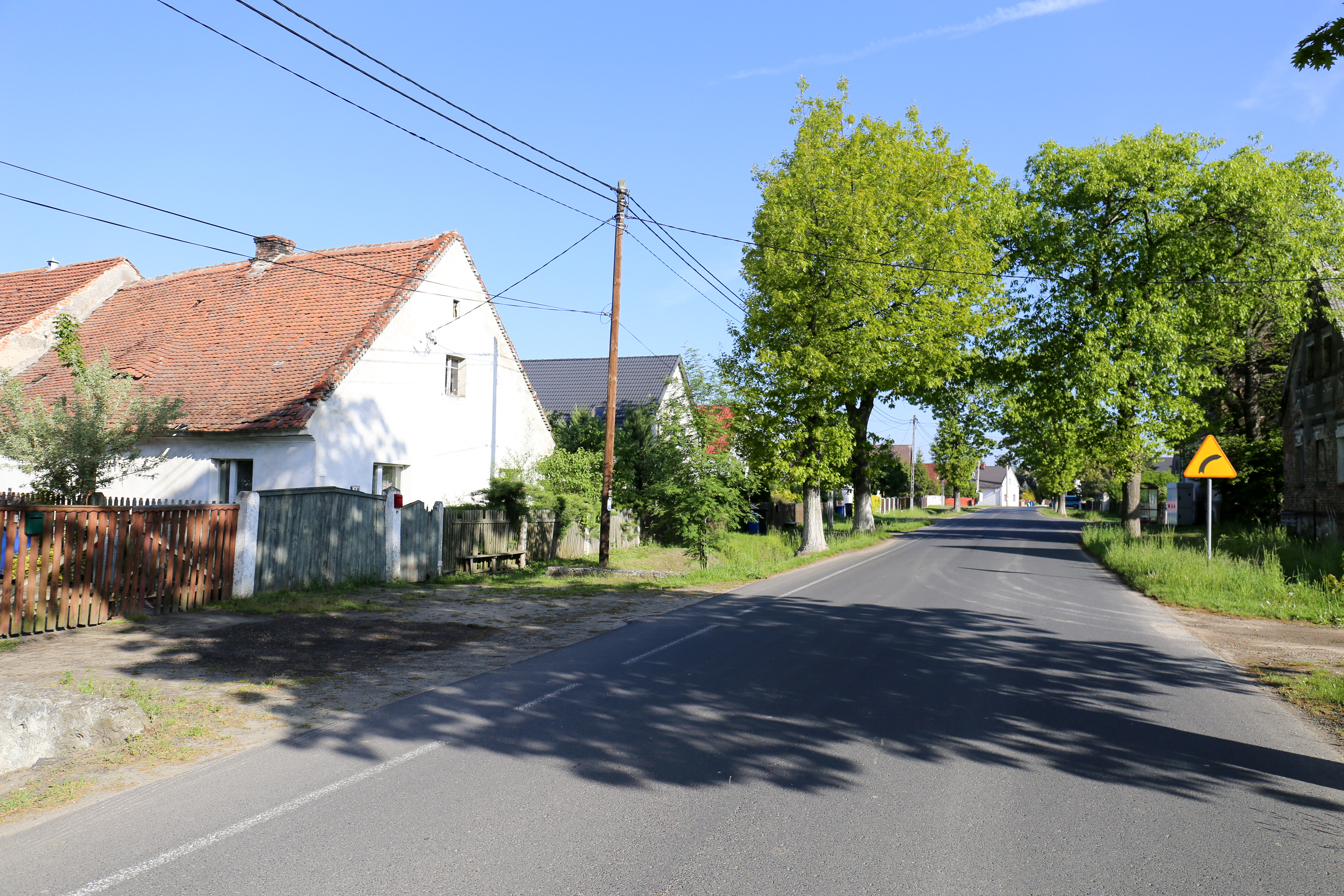

- Location within Poland
- Coordinates: 50°56′28″N 17°27′02″E
- Country: Poland
- Voivodeship: Opole
- County: Brzeg
- Gmina: Lubsza

Błota [ˈbwɔta] is a village in the administrative district of Gmina Lubsza, within Brzeg County, Opole Voivodeship, in south-western Poland.
