= Kamienna, Opole Voivodeship =

Kamienna
- Village
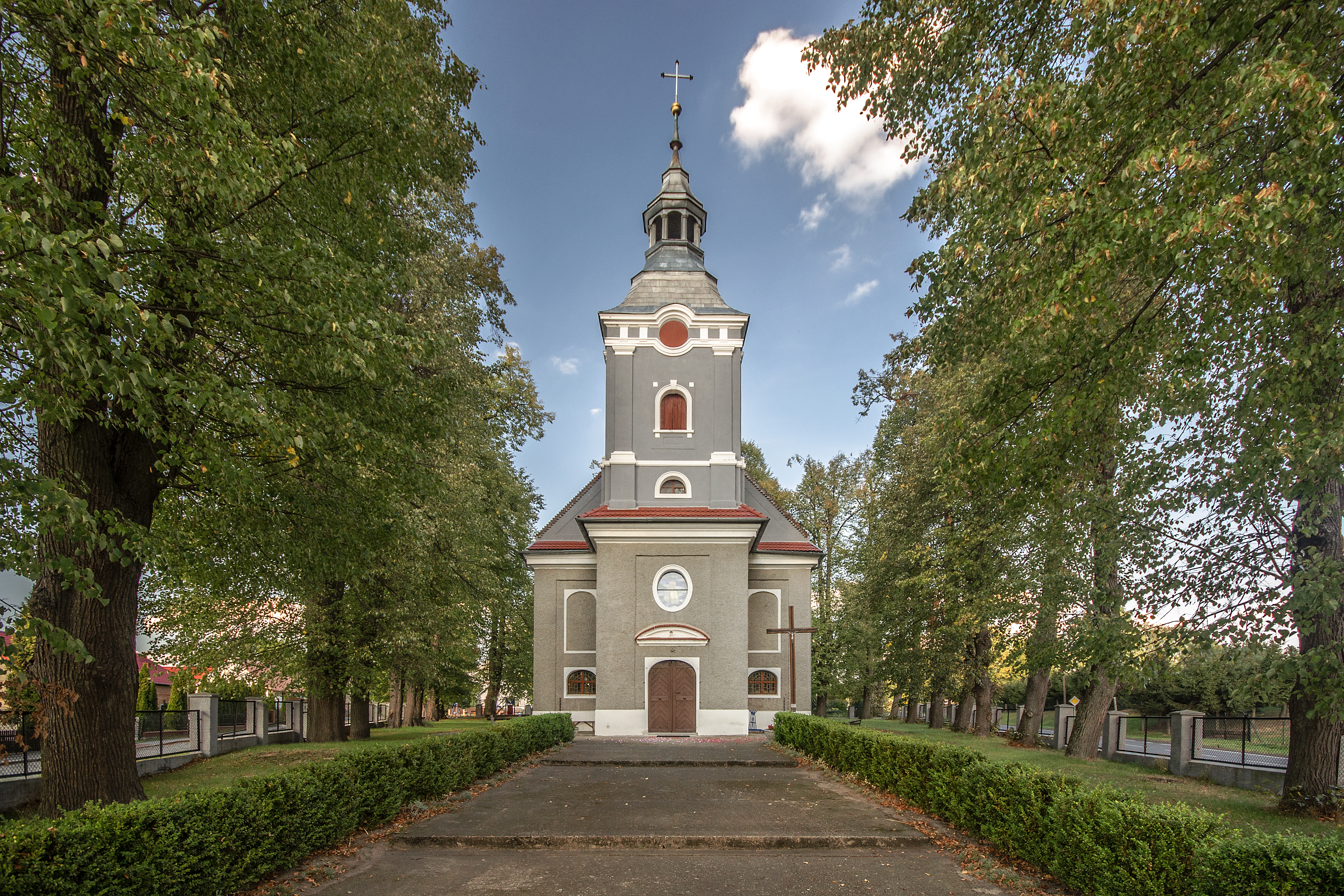

- Location within Poland
- Coordinates: 51°04′31″N 17°45′36″E
- Country: Poland
- Voivodeship: Opole
- County: Namysłów
- Gmina: Namysłów
- Population: 441

Kamienna [kaˈmjɛnna] is a village in the administrative district of Gmina Namysłów, within Namysłów County, Opole Voivodeship, in south-western Poland.
