= Wójcice, Lower Silesian Voivodeship =

Wójcice
- Village
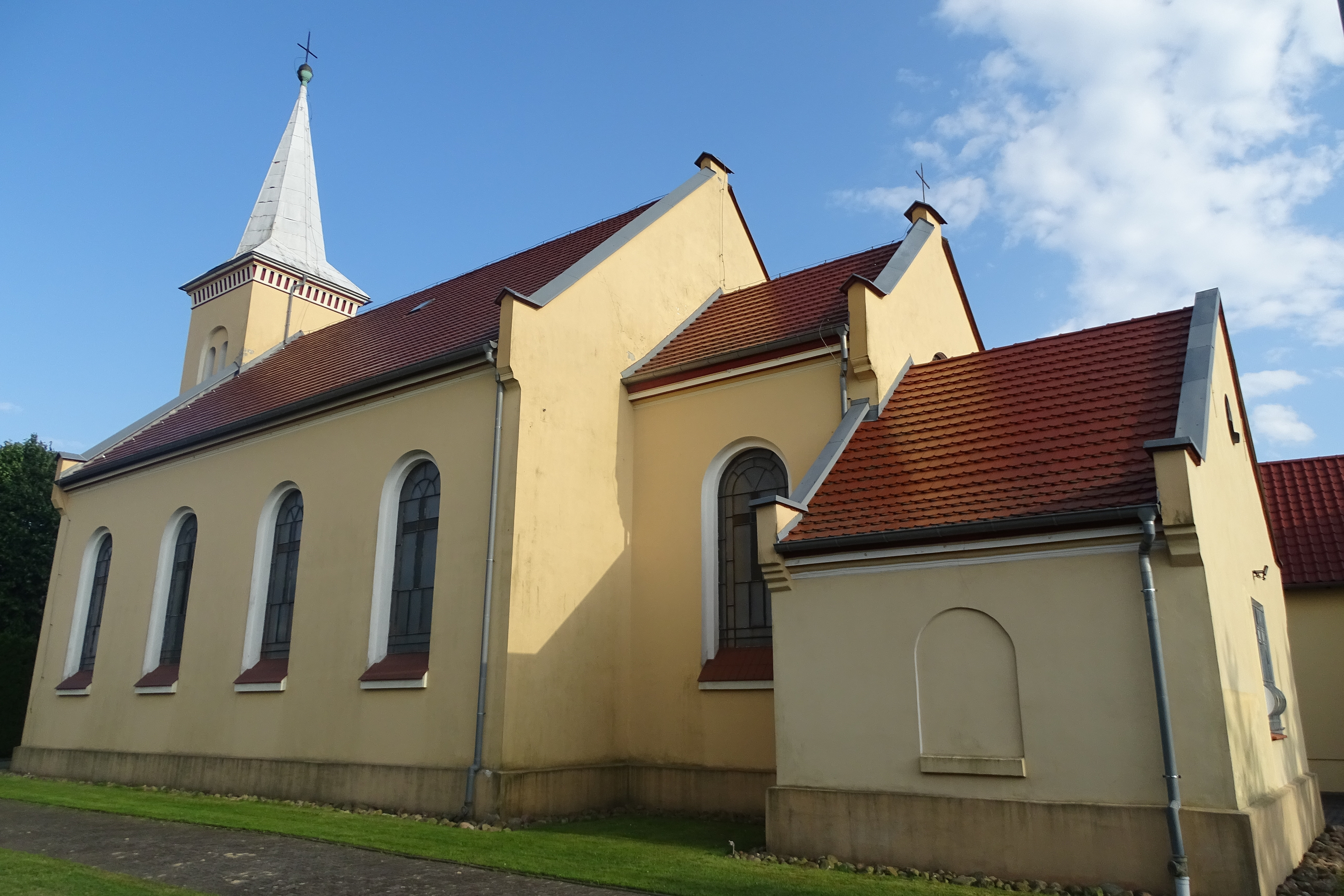
- Church of the Nativity of Blessed Virgin Mary

- Location within Poland
- Coordinates: 50°59′21″N 17°29′06″E
- Country: Poland
- Voivodeship: Lower Silesian
- County: Oława
- Gmina: Jelcz-Laskowice

Wójcice [vui̯ˈt͡ɕit͡sɛ], 1945-1947 Kamienie (German: Steindorf) is a village in the administrative district of Gmina Jelcz-Laskowice, within Oława County, Lower Silesian Voivodeship, in south-western Poland.
