= Kopalina, Lower Silesian Voivodeship =

Kopalina
- Village
- Location within Poland
- Coordinates: 51°01′44″N 17°24′57″E
- Country: Poland
- Voivodeship: Lower Silesian
- County: Oława
- Gmina: Jelcz-Laskowice

Kopalina [kɔpaˈlina] is a village in the administrative district of Gmina Jelcz-Laskowice, within Oława County, Lower Silesian Voivodeship, in south-western Poland.
