= Boruto (disambiguation) =

Boruto is Japanese a manga and anime series.

Boruto may also refer to:

- Boruto: Naruto the Movie, a 2015 Japanese animated film
- Boruto Uzumaki, the main protagonist of the film, manga and anime series
