= Brzeg County =

Brzeg County powiat brzeski
- County
- Flag Coat of arms

- Location within the voivodeship
- Coordinates (Brzeg): 50°52′N 17°29′E
- Country: Poland
- Voivodeship: Opole
- Seat: Brzeg
- Gminas: Total 6 (incl. 1 urban): Brzeg; Gmina Grodków; Gmina Lewin Brzeski; Gmina Lubsza; Gmina Olszanka; Gmina Skarbimierz

Area
  - Total: 876.52 km^{2} (338.43 sq mi)

Population (2019-06-30)
  - Total: 90,054
  - Density: 105/km^{2} (270/sq mi)
  - Urban: 50,221
  - Rural: 39,833
- Car plates: OB
- Website: www.brzeg-powiat.pl

Brzeg County (Polish: powiat brzeski [ˈpɔvʲat ˈbʐɛskʲi]) is a unit of territorial administration and local government (powiat) in Opole Voivodeship, south-western Poland. It came into being on January 1, 1999, as a result of the Polish local government reforms passed in 1998. Its administrative seat and largest town is Brzeg, which lies 39 kilometres (24 mi) north-west of the regional capital Opole. The county also contains the towns of Grodków, lying 22 km (14 mi) south of Brzeg, and Lewin Brzeski, 17 km (11 mi) south-east of Brzeg.

The county covers an area of 876.52 square kilometres (338.4 sq mi). As of 2019 its total population is 90,054, out of which the population of Brzeg is 35,890, that of Grodków is 8,595, that of Lewin Brzeski is 5,736, and the rural population is 39,833.

== Neighbouring counties ==
Brzeg County is bordered by Namysłów County to the north-east, Opole County to the south-east, Nysa County to the south, and Strzelin County and Oława County to the west.

== Administrative division ==
The county is subdivided into six gminas (one urban, two urban-rural and three rural). These are listed in the following table, in descending order of population.

Gmina	Type	Area (km^{2})	Population (2019)	Seat
Brzeg	urban	14.7	35,890	
Gmina Grodków	urban-rural	286.4	19,149	Grodków
Gmina Lewin Brzeski	urban-rural	159.7	12,968	Lewin Brzeski
Gmina Lubsza	rural	212.7	8,992	Lubsza
Gmina Skarbimierz	rural	110.5	8,149	Skarbimierz Osiedle
Gmina Olszanka	rural	92.6	4,906	Olszanka
