= Jankowice Małe =

- Village
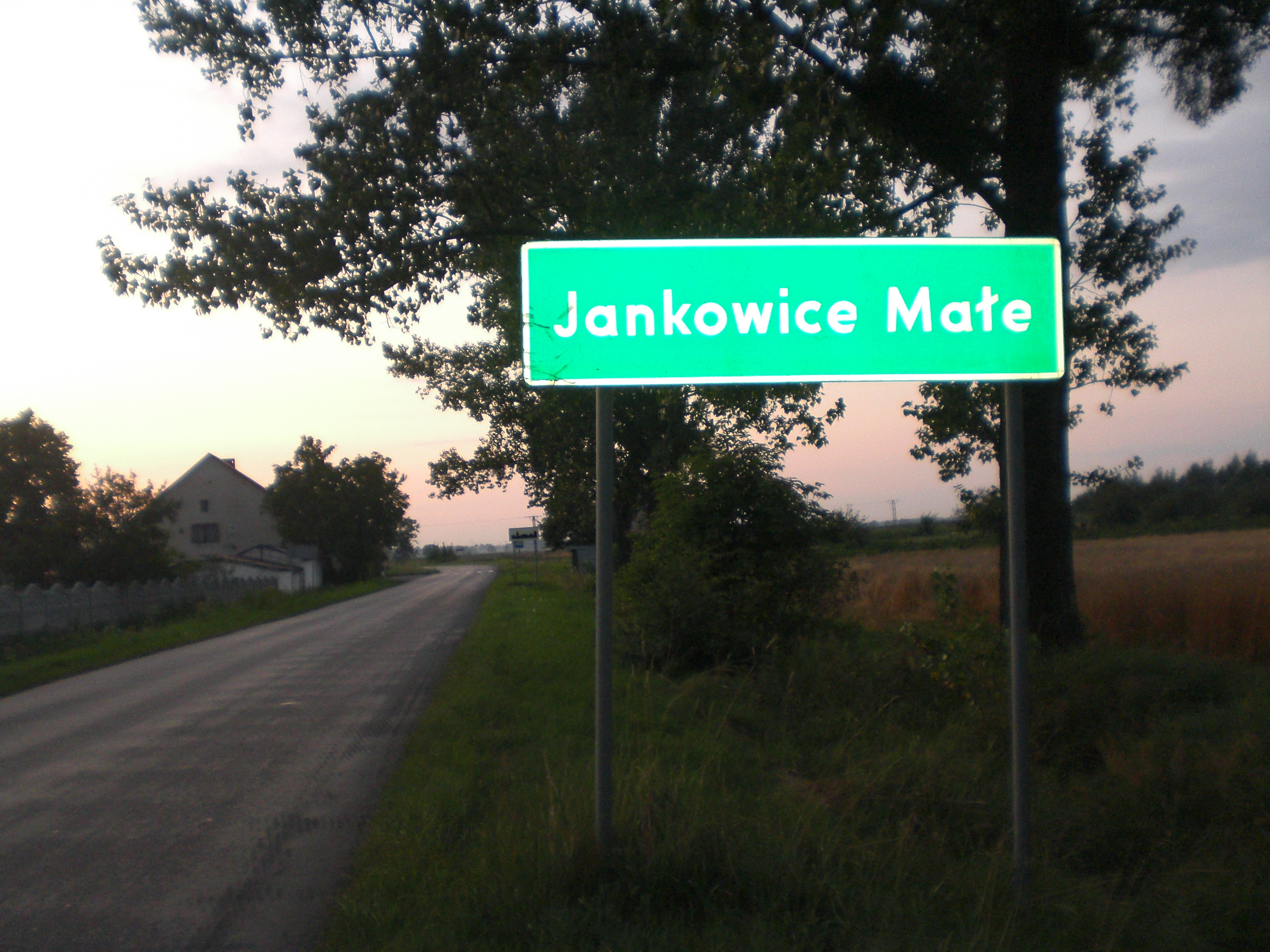

- Location within Poland
- Coordinates: 50°51′20″N 17°19′18″E
- Country: Poland
- Voivodeship: Lower Silesian
- County: Oława
- Gmina: Oława
- Time zone: UTC+1 (CET)
  - Summer (DST): UTC+2 (CEST)
- Vehicle registration: DOA

Jankowice Małe [jankɔˈvit͡sɛ ˈmawɛ] (German Klein Jenkwitz) is a village in the administrative district of Gmina Oława, within Oława County, Lower Silesian Voivodeship, in south-western Poland.

== Notable residents ==
Richard Peter (1895–1977), German press photographer and photojournalist
