= Richard Peter =

German photographer (1895–1977)

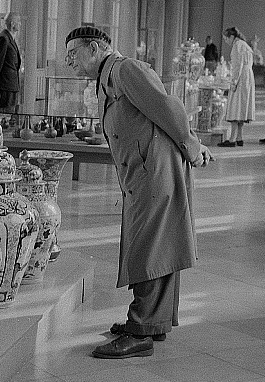
- Self-portrait of Peter looking at the porcelain collection in the Zwinger
- Born: 10 May 1895; Klein Jenkwitz, Landkreis Ohlau, Province of Silesia, German Empire
- Died: 3 October 1977 (aged 82); Dresden, Bezirk Dresden, East Germany
- Occupations: Blacksmith; miner; photographer
- Years active: 1920s-1977
- Political party: SED (expelled 1949)
- Other political affiliations: KPD; USPD
- Movement: Communism
- Conscription
- Allegiance: Germany
- Branch: Imperial German Army; Wehrmacht
- Service years: 1914-1918; 1943–1945
- Conflict: World War I; World War II

Richard Peter (10 May 1895 – 3 October 1977) was a German press photographer and photojournalist. He is best known for his photographs of Dresden just after the end of the Second World War.

== Life ==
Richard Peter was born and raised in Klein Jenkwitz, Silesia, where as a teenager he worked as a smith and a miner while dabbling in photography. He was drafted into the German army in 1914 to serve in World War I. After the war he settled in Halle and later in Dresden. He joined the labor movement and the Communist Party of Germany (KPD), and during the 1920s and early 1930s his photographs were published in various left-wing publications. Because of this, he was promptly barred from working as a press photographer when the Nazi Party rose to power in 1933. During the Third Reich, he worked in advertising, before being drafted again to serve in World War II.

Peter returned to Dresden in September 1945 to find the city destroyed after the bombing of Dresden of February 1945. His personal archive and equipment had been completely destroyed in the raids. Starting over with borrowed equipment, he began to document the damage to the city and the beginnings of its reconstruction. His photographs were published in 1949 in a volume called Dresden, eine Kamera klagt an (transl. Dresden, a photographic accusation).

Dresden was in the Soviet occupation zone, and Peter's later life was in the new communist East Germany. In 1949, Peter was expelled from the ruling Socialist Unity Party of Germany, the successor of the KPD, when he investigated corrupt party officials. He continued to work as a freelance art photographer in Dresden until his death in 1977, and eventually won some international recognition for his work. Peter's more than 5,000 negatives and prints were acquired by the Saxon State Library in 1983.

== Gallery ==
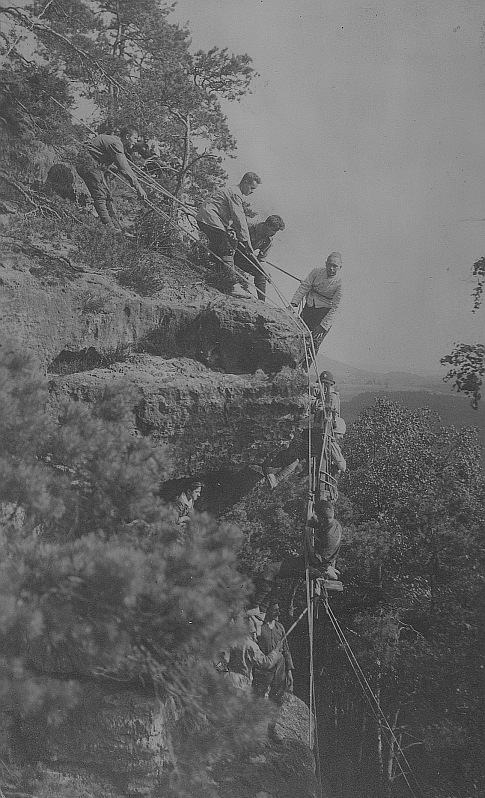
Abseiling at the Zirkelstein

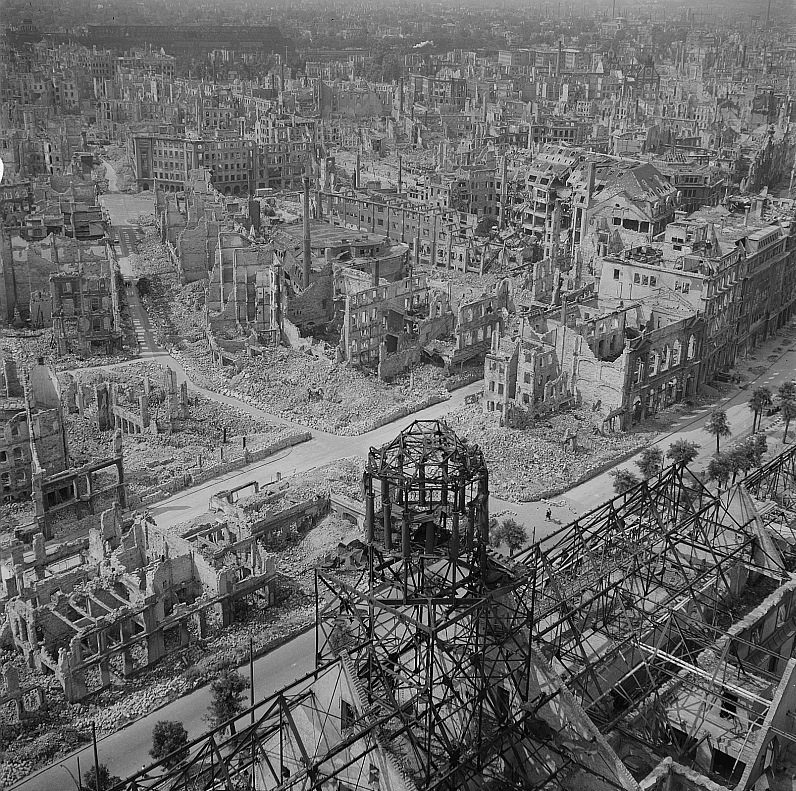
The ruins of Dresden by Richard Peter

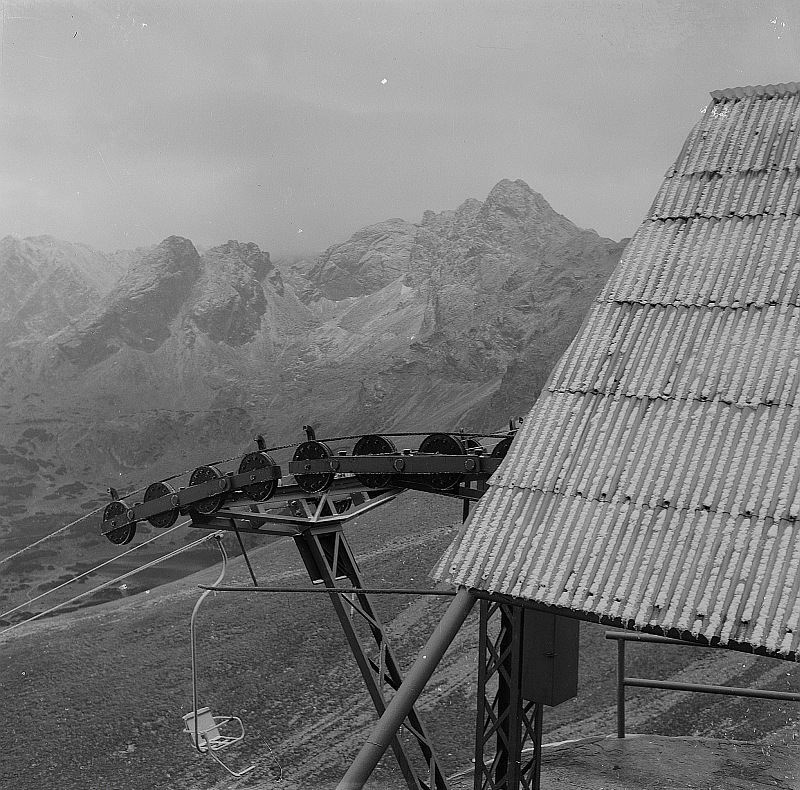
Zakopane and chairlift

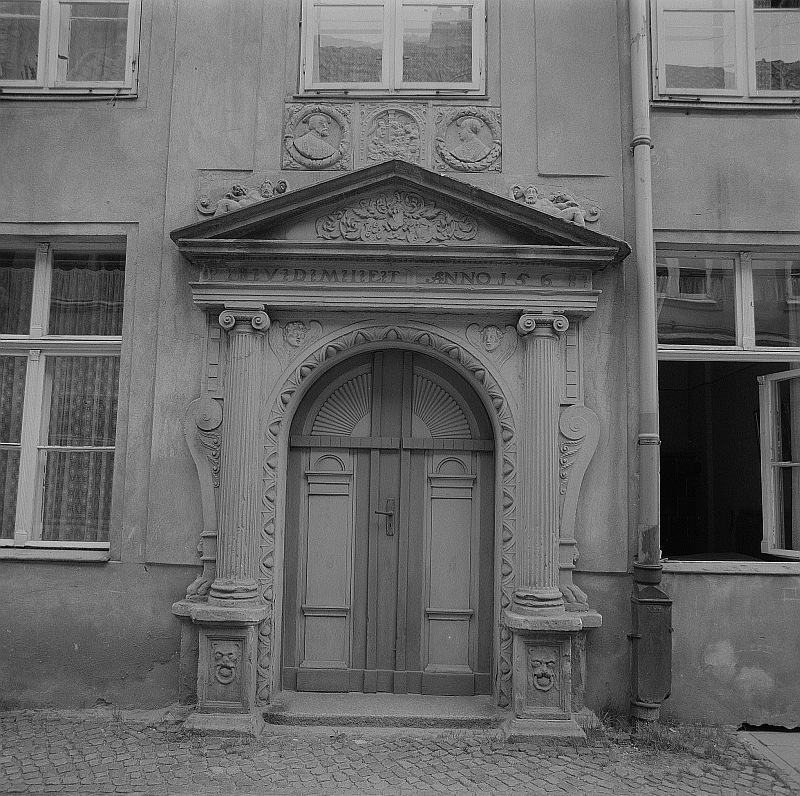
Stralsund in the 20th century

== Sources ==
- Deutsches Historisches Museum Berlin, Richard Peter sen. (retrieved 11 February 2005).
