= Chwastnica =

Chwastnica may refer to the following places in Poland:

- Chwastnica in Gmina Domaniów, Oława County in Lower Silesian Voivodeship (SW Poland)
- Other places called Chwastnica (listed in Polish Wikipedia)
