= Piskorzówek =

- Village
- Location within Poland
- Coordinates: 50°54′N 17°8′E
- Country: Poland
- Voivodeship: Lower Silesian
- County: Oława
- Gmina: Domaniów
- Time zone: UTC+1 (CET)
  - Summer (DST): UTC+2 (CEST)
- Vehicle registration: DOA

Piskorzówek [piskɔˈʐuvɛk] is a village in the administrative district of Gmina Domaniów, within Oława County, Lower Silesian Voivodeship, in southwestern Poland.

The name Piskorzówek is a diminutive form of the name of the nearby village of Piskorzów, which in turn comes from the Polish word piskorz, which means "weatherfish".

== Transport ==
The Polish A4 motorway runs nearby, north-east of the village.
