= Ścinawa (disambiguation) =

Ścinawa may refer to:

- Ścinawa, a town in Lower Silesian Voivodeship, in south-western Poland
- Ścinawa, Oława County, a village in Oława County, Lower Silesian Voivodeship, in south-western Poland
- Ścinawa Mała, a village in the administrative district of Gmina Korfantów, within Nysa County, Opole Voivodeship, in south-western Poland
- Ścinawa Nyska, a village in the administrative district of Gmina Korfantów, within Nysa County, Opole Voivodeship, in south-western Poland
- Ścinawa Polska, a village in the administrative district of Gmina Oława, within Oława County, Lower Silesian Voivodeship, in south-western Poland
- Scinawa Commune, an urban-rural gmina (administrative district) in Lubin County, Lower Silesian Voivodeship, in south-western Poland
