= Maszków, Lower Silesian Voivodeship =

Maszków
- Village
- Location within Poland
- Coordinates: 50°53′N 17°21′E
- Country: Poland
- Voivodeship: Lower Silesian
- County: Oława
- Gmina: Oława

Maszków [ˈmaʂkuf] is a village in the administrative district of Gmina Oława, within Oława County, Lower Silesian Voivodeship, in south-western Poland.
