= Janków, Lower Silesian Voivodeship =

Janków
- Village
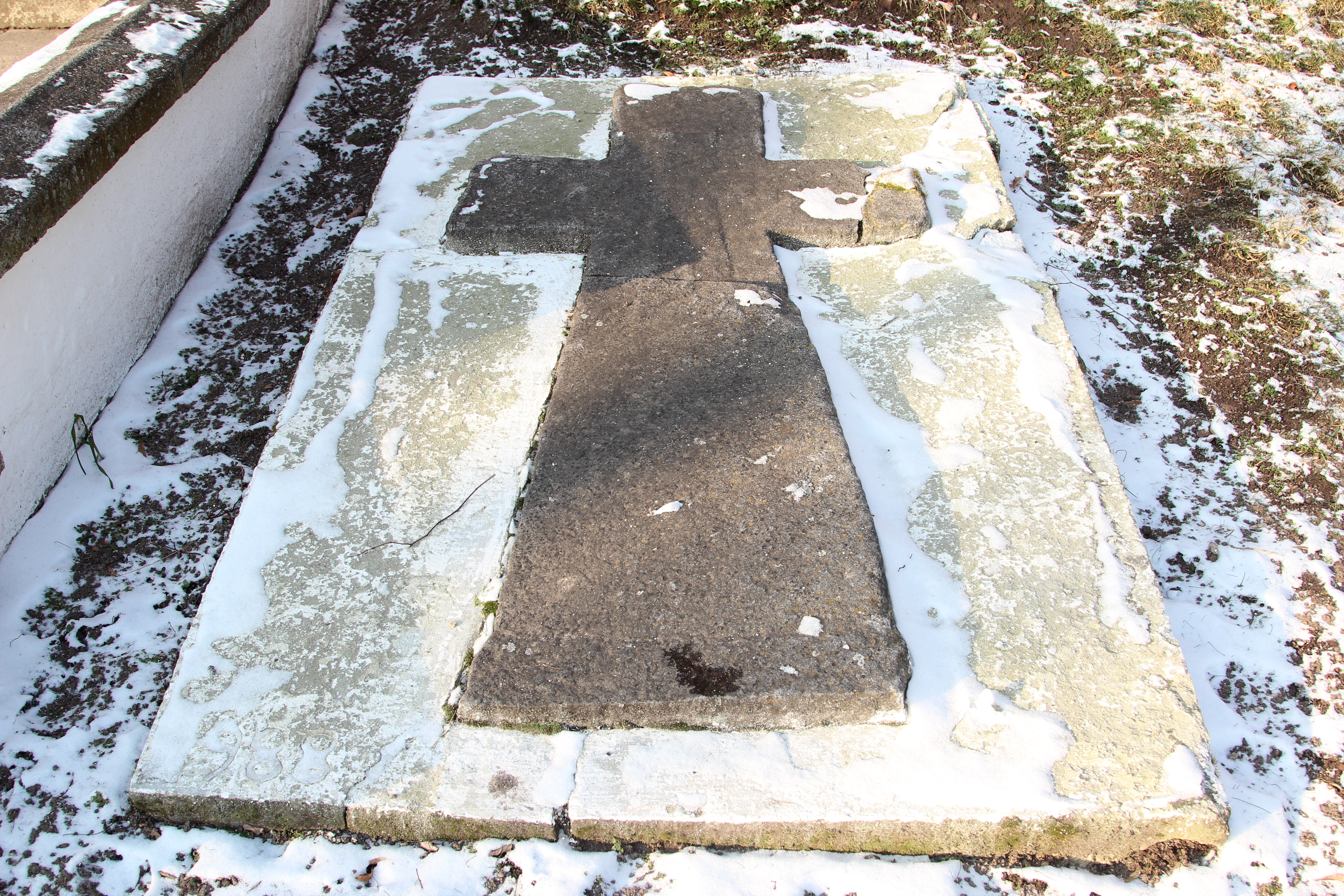
- Stone cross

- Location within Poland
- Coordinates: 50°56′42″N 17°09′51″E
- Country: Poland
- Voivodeship: Lower Silesian
- County: Oława
- Gmina: Domaniów

Janków [ˈjankuf] is a village in the administrative district of Gmina Domaniów, within Oława County, Lower Silesian Voivodeship, in south-western Poland.
