= Jakubowice, Lower Silesian Voivodeship =

Jakubowice
- Village
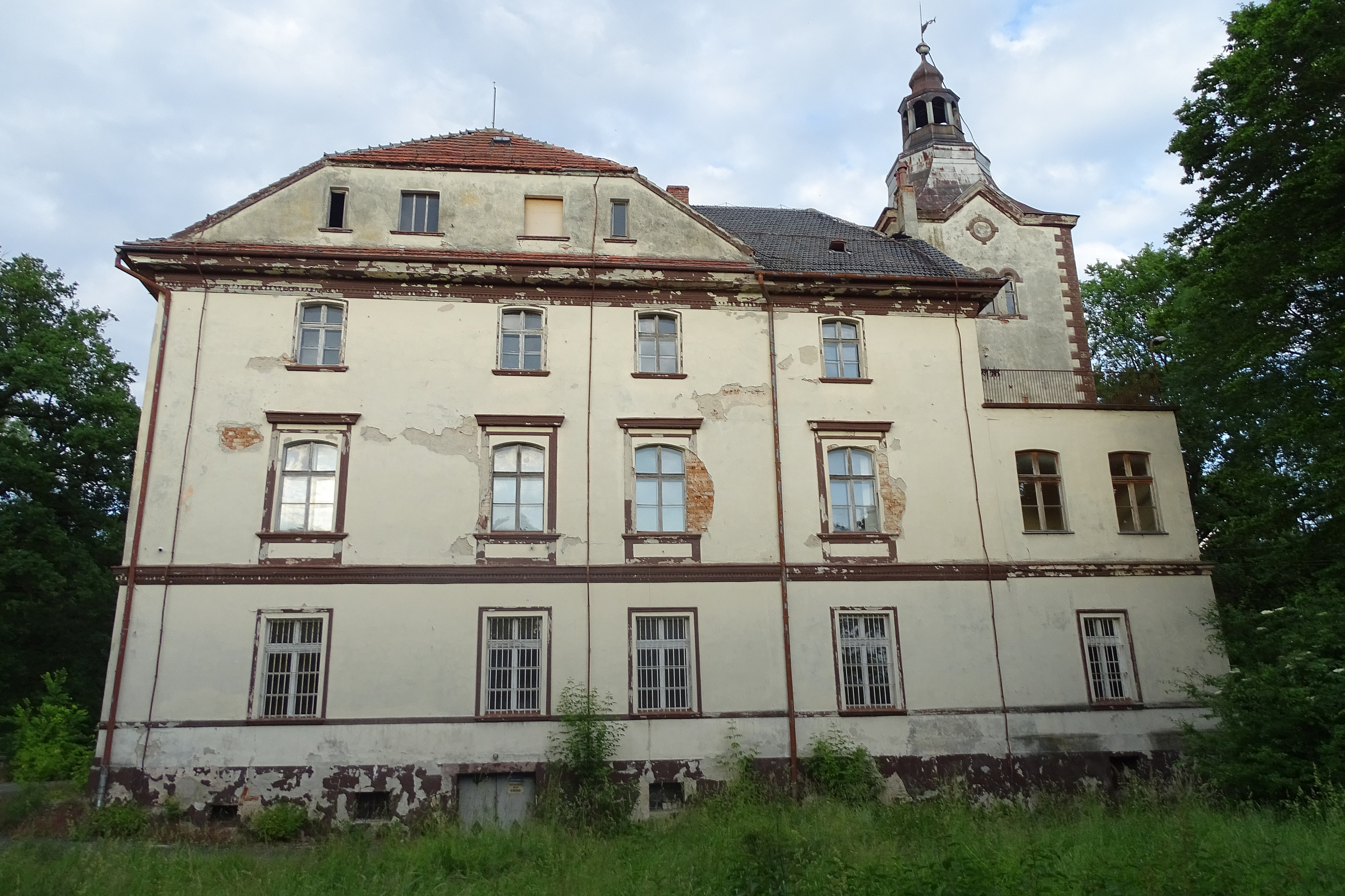
- Palace

- Location within Poland
- Coordinates: 50°53′05″N 17°14′41″E
- Country: Poland
- Voivodeship: Lower Silesian
- County: Oława
- Gmina: Oława
- Population: 27

Jakubowice ([jakubɔˈvit͡sɛ]) is a village in the administrative district of Gmina Oława, within Oława County, Lower Silesian Voivodeship, in south-western Poland.
