= Siedlce, Oława County =

Siedlce
- Village
- Location within Poland
- Coordinates: 51°0′N 17°17′E
- Country: Poland
- Voivodeship: Lower Silesian
- County: Oława
- Gmina: Oława
- Website: http://www.siedlce.oz.pl

Siedlce [ˈɕɛdlt͡sɛ] is a village in the administrative district of Gmina Oława, Oława County, Lower Silesian Voivodeship, Poland.

The village's area is 1217.80 hectares according to the Oława Commune Office.

As of 2011, Siedlice had 418 inhabitants (213 women and 205 men).
