= Gęsice, Lower Silesian Voivodeship =

Gęsice
- Village
- Location within Poland
- Coordinates: 50°56′59″N 17°07′01″E
- Country: Poland
- Voivodeship: Lower Silesian
- County: Oława
- Gmina: Domaniów
- Population: 211

Gęsice [ɡɛ̃ˈɕit͡sɛ] is a village in the administrative district of Gmina Domaniów, within Oława County, Lower Silesian Voivodeship, in south-western Poland.
