= Stary Otok =

- Village
- Location within Poland
- Coordinates: 50°58′42″N 17°19′20″E
- Country: Poland
- Voivodeship: Lower Silesian
- County: Oława
- Gmina: Oława

Stary Otok [ˈstarɨ ˈɔtɔk] is a village in the administrative district of Gmina Oława, in Oława County, Lower Silesian Voivodeship, south-western Poland.
