= Brzezimierz =

- Village
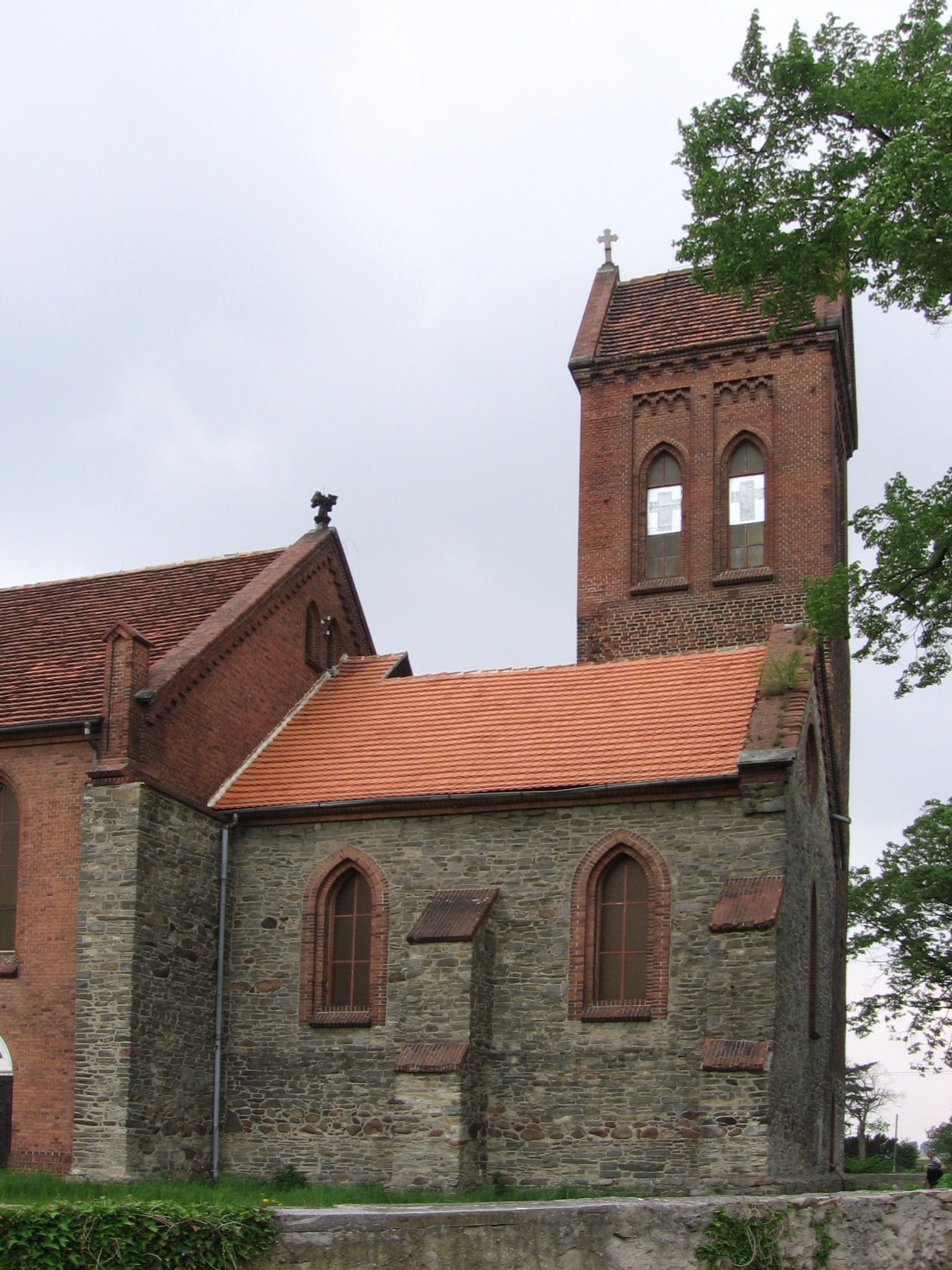

- Location within Poland
- Coordinates: 50°53′33″N 17°12′04″E
- Country: Poland
- Voivodeship: Lower Silesian
- County: Oława
- Gmina: Domaniów

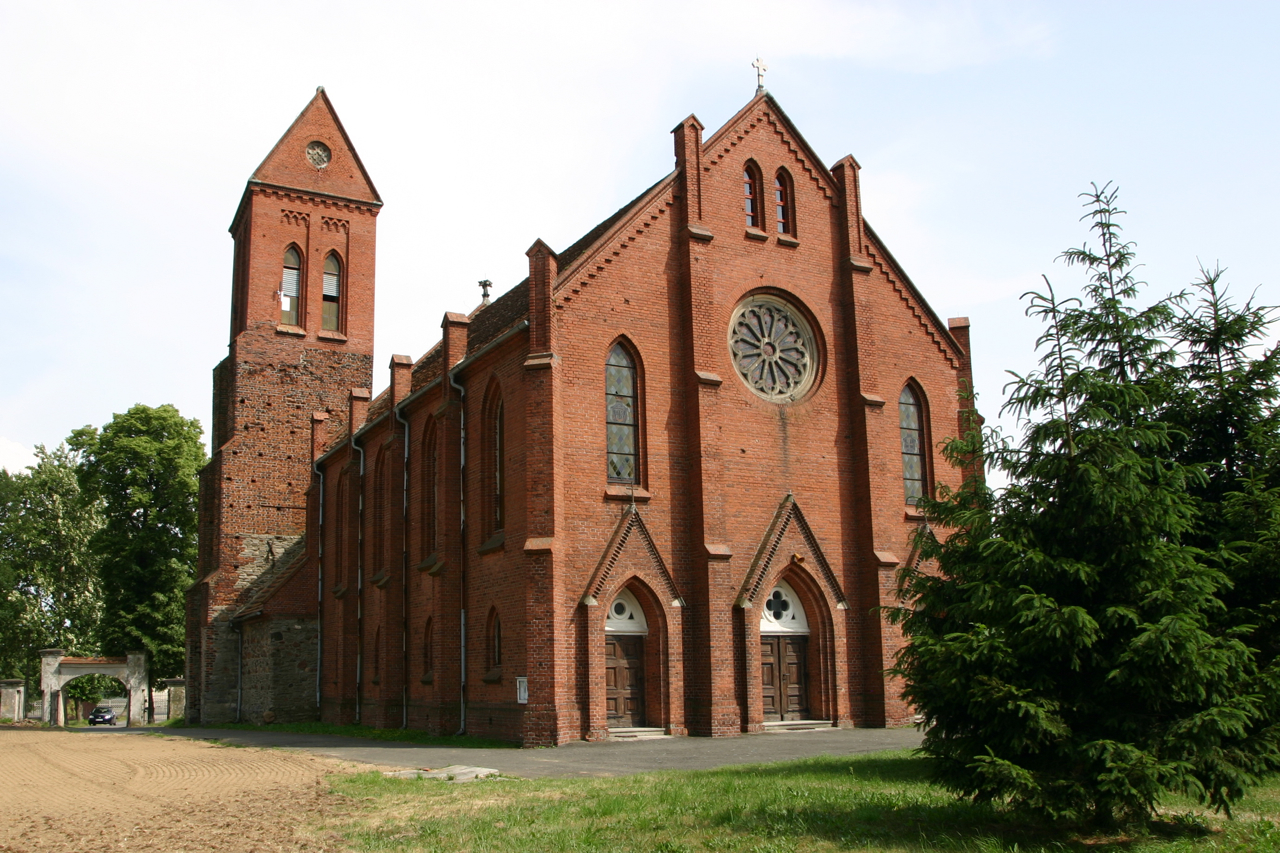
Brzezimierz

Brzezimierz [bʐɛˈʑimjɛʂ] is a village in the administrative district of Gmina Domaniów, within Oława County, Lower Silesian Voivodeship, in south-western Poland.
