= Janików, Lower Silesian Voivodeship =

Janików
- Village
- Location within Poland
- Coordinates: 50°58′12″N 17°22′24″E
- Country: Poland
- Voivodeship: Lower Silesian
- County: Oława
- Gmina: Oława

Janików [jaˈnikuf] is a village in the administrative district of Gmina Oława, within Oława County, Lower Silesian Voivodeship, in south-western Poland.
