= Alfred Winkler =

German Nordic combined skier

Personal information
- Nationality: German
- Born: 4 May 1943 (age 81); Sobocisko, Poland

Sport
- Sport: Nordic combined

Alfred Winkler (born 4 May 1943) is a German skier. He competed in the Nordic combined at the 1968 Winter Olympics and the 1972 Winter Olympics.
