= Pełczyce, Oława County =

Pełczyce
- Village
- Location within Poland
- Coordinates: 50°54′25″N 17°13′09″E
- Country: Poland
- Voivodeship: Lower Silesian
- County: Oława
- Gmina: Domaniów

Pełczyce [pɛu̯ˈt͡ʂɨt͡sɛ] is a village in the administrative district of Gmina Domaniów, within Oława County, Lower Silesian Voivodeship, in south-western Poland.
