= Goszczyna =

- Village
- Location within Poland
- Coordinates: 50°52′02″N 17°11′32″E
- Country: Poland
- Voivodeship: Lower Silesian
- County: Oława
- Gmina: Domaniów

Goszczyna [ɡɔʂˈt͡ʂɨna] is a village in the administrative district of Gmina Domaniów, within Oława County, Lower Silesian Voivodeship, in south-western Poland.
