= Godzikowice =

- Village
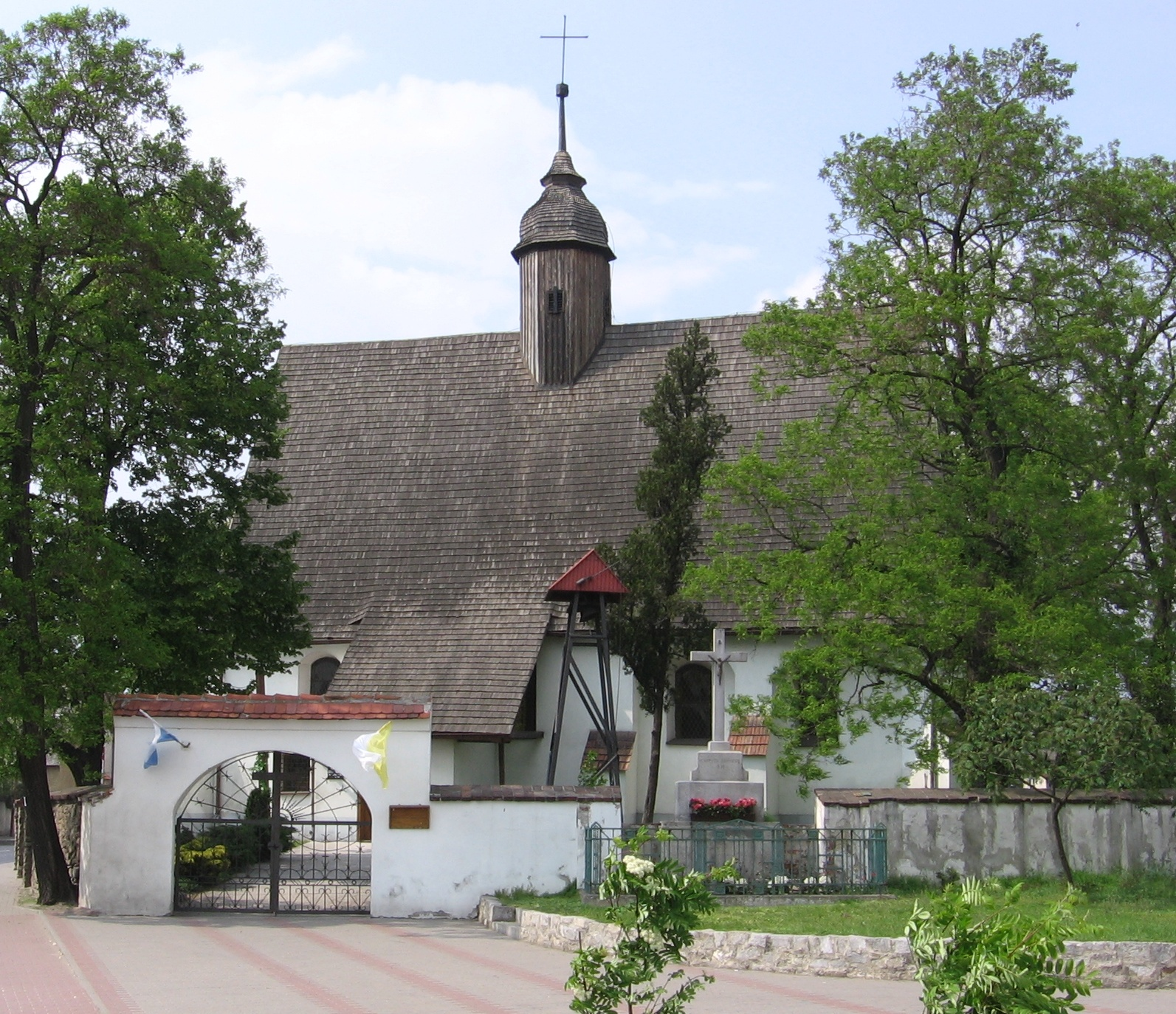

- Location within Poland
- Coordinates: 50°54′31″N 17°18′48″E
- Country: Poland
- Voivodeship: Lower Silesian
- County: Oława
- Gmina: Oława
- Population (2012): 804

Godzikowice [ɡɔd͡ʑikɔˈvit͡sɛ] is a village in the administrative district of Gmina Oława, within Oława County, Lower Silesian Voivodeship, in south-western Poland.
