= Wierzbno, Lower Silesian Voivodeship =

Wierzbno
- Village
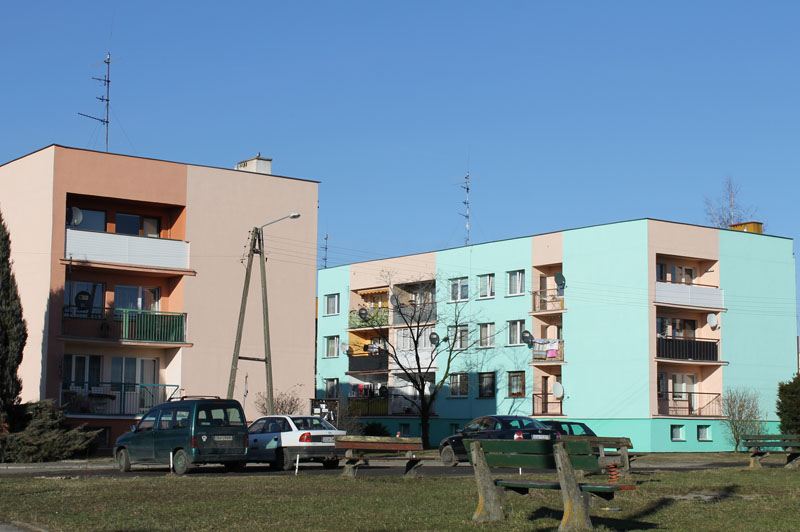

- Location within Poland
- Coordinates: 50°56′6″N 17°10′45″E
- Country: Poland
- Voivodeship: Lower Silesian
- County: Oława
- Gmina: Domaniów
- Population (approx.): 1,450
- Time zone: UTC+1 (CET)
  - Summer (DST): UTC+2 (CEST)
- Vehicle registration: DOA
- Website: http://www.wierzbno.ovh.org

Wierzbno [ˈvjɛʐbnɔ] is a village in the administrative district of Gmina Domaniów, within Oława County, Lower Silesian Voivodeship, in south-western Poland.

== History ==
The name of the village is of Polish origin and comes from the word wierzba, which means "willow". The village was once a possession of the Saint Vincent Monastery in Wrocław. In 1840, it had a population of 796, and in 1885 it had a population of 863, mostly employed in flax, rapeseed and fruit cultivation.

== Transport ==
The Voivodeship road 346 runs through Wierzbno, and the A4 motorway runs nearby, south-west of the village.

== Notable people ==
- Szymon Kołecki (born 1981), Polish Olympic Champion weightlifter
