= Gustav Schnürer =

German-Swiss historian (1860–1941)

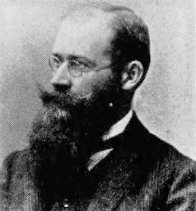
- Born: 30 June 1860; Jätzdorf, Province of Silesia
- Died: 14 December 1941 (aged 81)
- Education: University of Berlin; University of Breslau; University of Münster
- Occupation: Historian

Gustav Schnürer (30 June 1860 – 14 December 1941) was a German-Swiss historian.

== Biography ==
Gustav Schnürer was born in the Silesian village of Jätzdorf on 30 June 1860.

He studied history, geography and philology at the universities of Berlin, Breslau and Münster, earning his doctorate in 1883 at Münster. Afterwards, he worked as an editorial assistant at Munich, later obtaining a professorship in medieval history at the University of Fribourg (1889).

Schnürer is known for his studies of religious and religio-cultural history. His best known written work was Kirche und Kultur im Mittelalter (1926), which was translated into English in 1956, by George J. Undreiner as, Church and Culture in the Middle Ages: 350–814.

He was co-founder of Deutschen Gesellschaft für christliche Kunst (German Society of Christian Art) (1893) and Zeitschrift für schweizerische Kirchengeschichte (Magazine of Swiss Church History) (1907). He was also a contributor to the Catholic Encyclopedia.

== Sources ==
- Albert Portmann-Tinguely (1995). "Schnürer, Gustav". In Bautz, Traugott (ed.). Biographisch-Bibliographisches Kirchenlexikon (BBKL) (in German). Vol. 9. Herzberg: Bautz. cols. 593–596. ISBN 3-88309-058-1. English translation
