= Polwica, Lower Silesian Voivodeship =

Polwica
- Village
- Location within Poland
- Coordinates: 50°54′N 17°11′E
- Country: Poland
- Voivodeship: Lower Silesian
- County: Oława
- Gmina: Domaniów

Polwica [pɔlˈvit͡sa] is a village in the administrative district of Gmina Domaniów, within Oława County, Lower Silesian Voivodeship, in south-western Poland.
