= Niwnik =

- Village
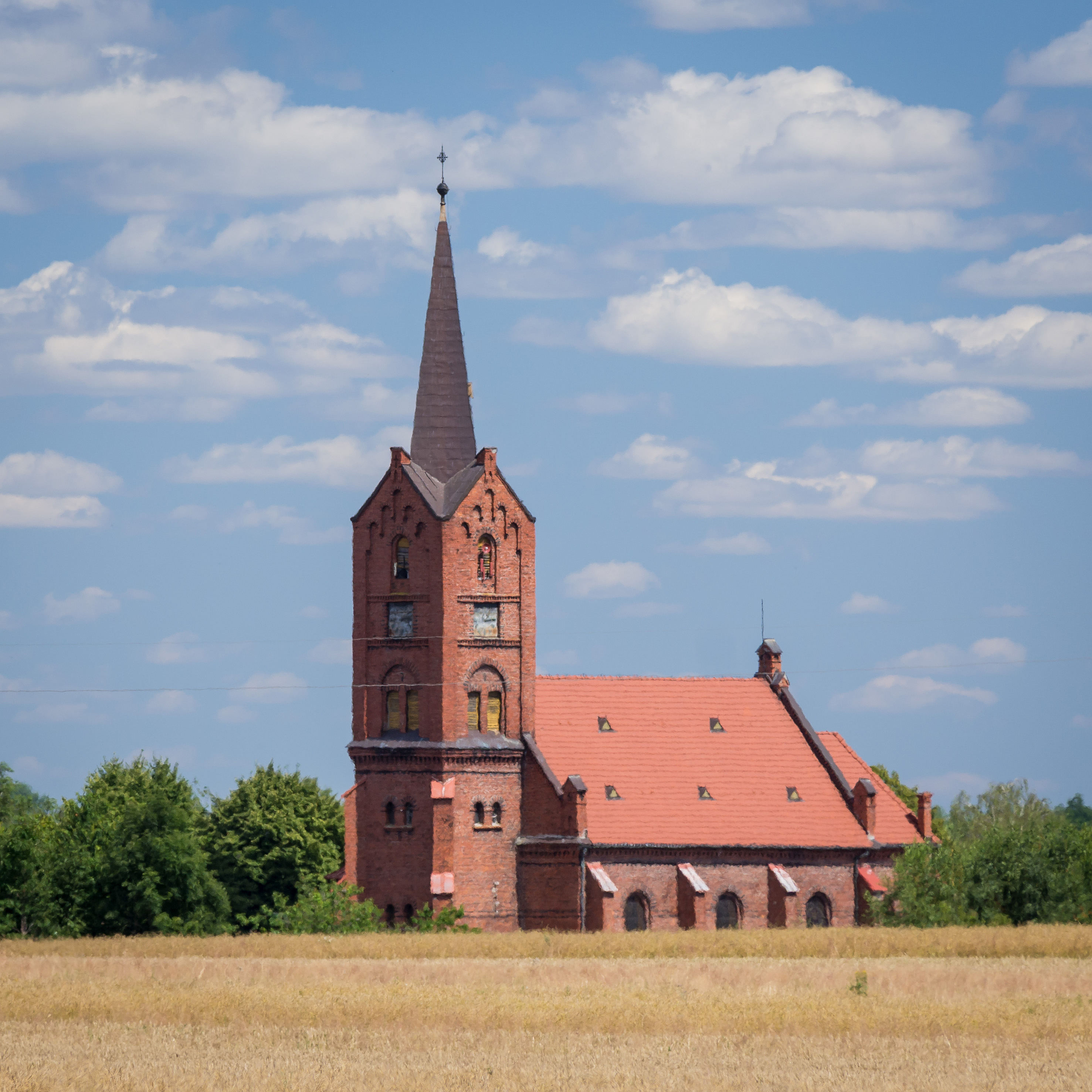
- Catholic church

- Location within Poland
- Coordinates: 50°56′N 17°18′E
- Country: Poland
- Voivodeship: Lower Silesian
- County: Oława
- Gmina: Oława
- Elevation: 170 m (560 ft)

Niwnik [ˈnivnik] is a village in the administrative district of Gmina Oława, within Oława County, Lower Silesian Voivodeship, in south-western Poland.
