= Wyszkowice =

- Village
- Location within Poland
- Coordinates: 50°52′N 17°10′E
- Country: Poland
- Voivodeship: Lower Silesian
- County: Oława
- Gmina: Domaniów

Wyszkowice [vɨʂkɔˈvit͡sɛ] is a village in the administrative district of Gmina Domaniów, within Oława County, Lower Silesian Voivodeship, in south-western Poland.
