= Zakrzów, Oława County =

Village in Silesia

Zakrzów
- Village
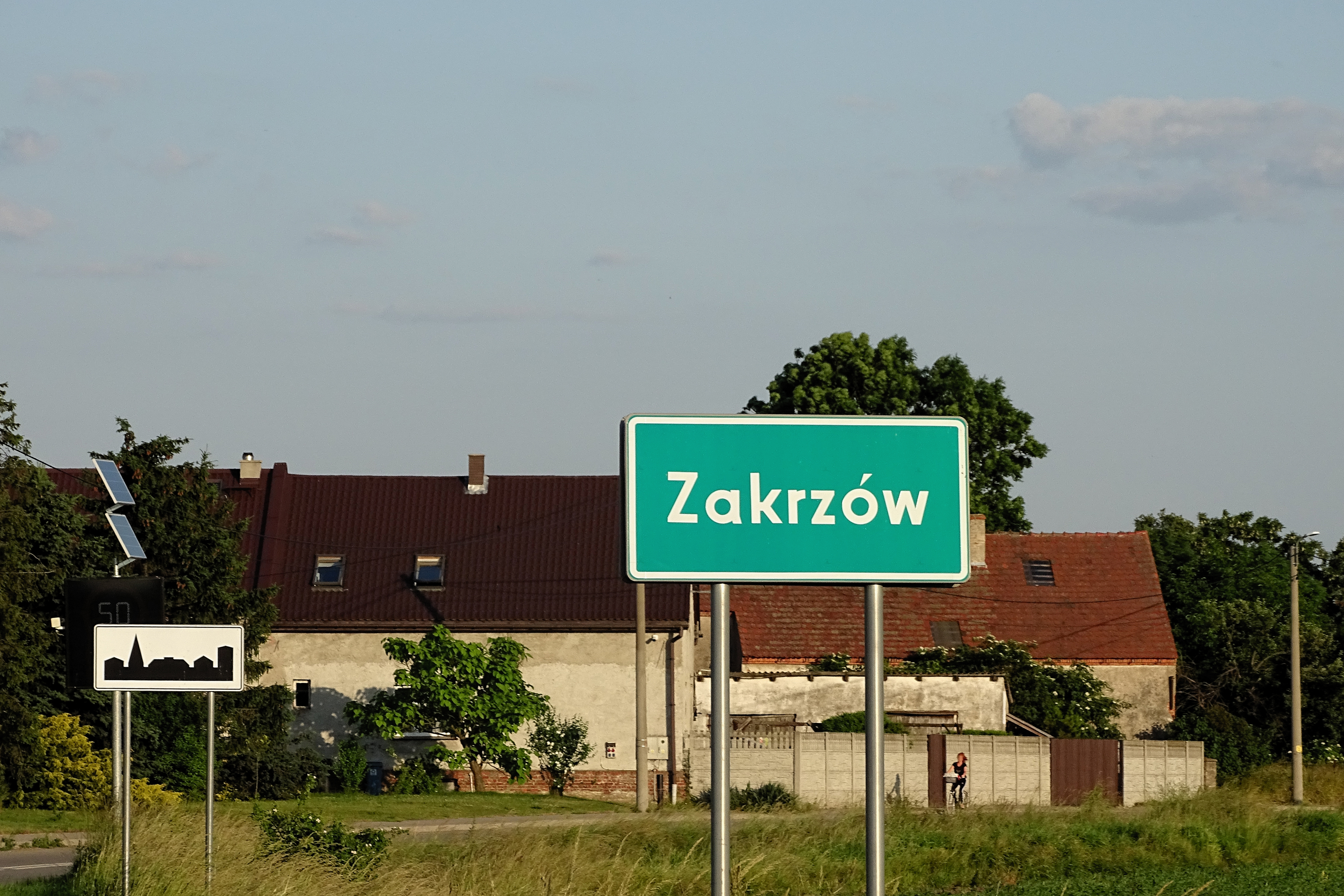
- Interactive map of Zakrzów
- Location within Poland
- Coordinates: 51°00′05″N 17°15′25″E
- Country: Poland
- Voivodeship: Lower Silesian
- County: Oława
- Gmina: Oława

Government
  - Sołtys: Daniel Cholewicki

Area
  - Total: 461.79 ha (1,141.1 acres)
- Time zone: UTC+1 (CET)
  - Summer (DST): UTC+2 (CEST)
- Postal code: 55-200
- SIMC: 0879660
- Vehicle registration: DOA

Zakrzów [ˈzakʂuf] is a village in the administrative district of Gmina Oława, within Oława County, Lower Silesian Voivodeship, in south-western Poland. It is located in the historical region of Silesia
