= Kuny, Lower Silesian Voivodeship =

Kuny
- Village
- Location within Poland
- Coordinates: 50°54′N 17°12′E
- Country: Poland
- Voivodeship: Lower Silesian
- County: Oława
- Gmina: Domaniów

Kuny [ˈkunɨ] is a village in the administrative district of Gmina Domaniów, within Oława County, Lower Silesian Voivodeship, in south-western Poland.
