= Marszowice, Lower Silesian Voivodeship =

Marszowice
- Village
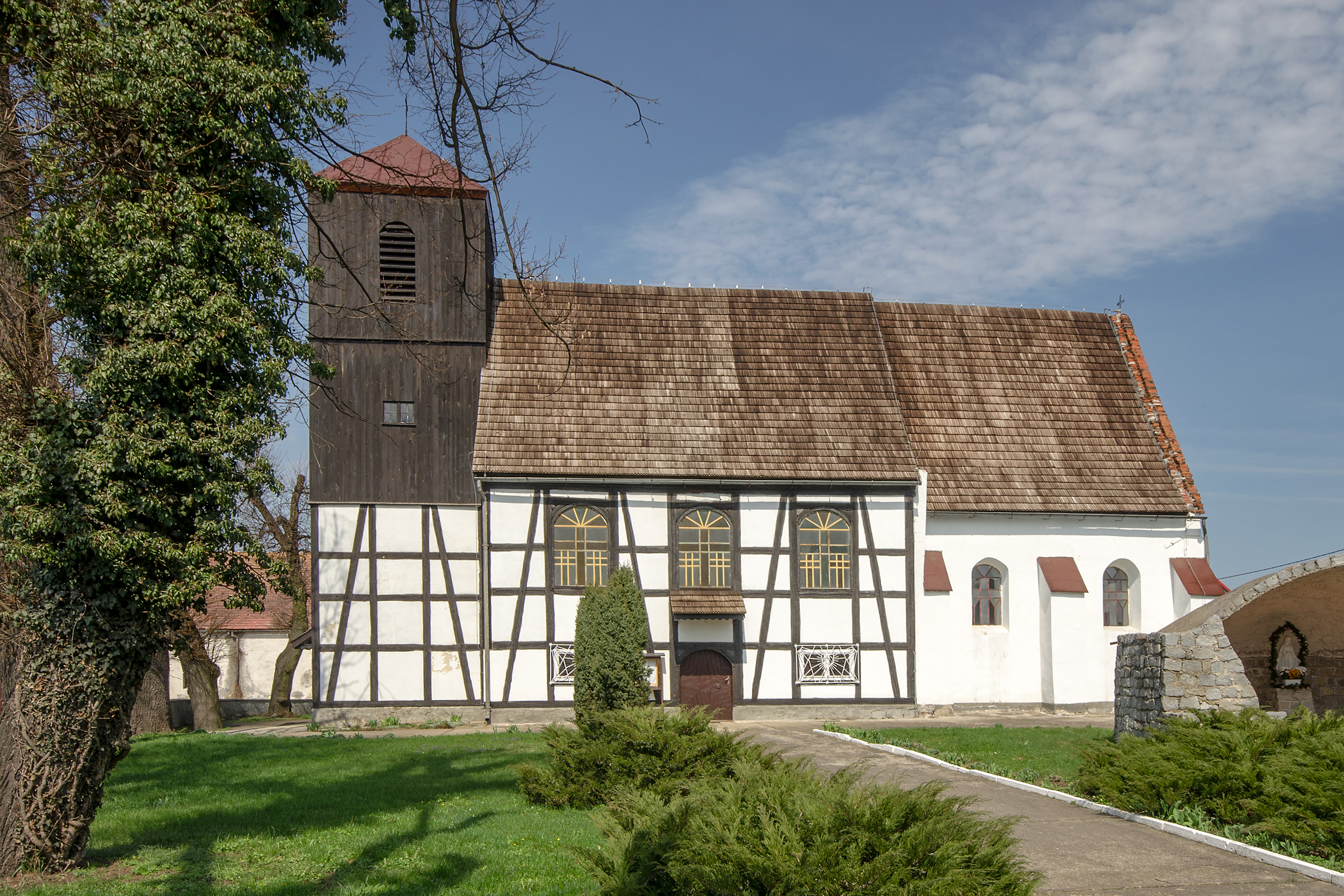
- Church of the Nativity of the Virgin Mary in Marszowice

- Location within Poland
- Coordinates: 50°56′N 17°13′E
- Country: Poland
- Voivodeship: Lower Silesian
- County: Oława
- Gmina: Oława
- Time zone: UTC+1 (CET)
  - Summer (DST): UTC+2 (CEST)
- Vehicle registration: DOA

Marszowice [marʂɔˈvit͡sɛ] is a village in the administrative district of Gmina Oława, within Oława County, Lower Silesian Voivodeship, in south-western Poland.

The name of the settlement is derived from the Polish word marsz, which means "march", in reference to marches when horses were herded to pasture.

A 10th-century sword was found in the village, now in the collection of a museum in Wrocław.
