= Godzinowice =

- Village
- Location within Poland
- Coordinates: 50°54′37″N 17°15′31″E
- Country: Poland
- Voivodeship: Lower Silesian
- County: Oława
- Gmina: Oława

Godzinowice [ɡɔd͡ʑinɔˈvit͡sɛ] is a village in the administrative district of Gmina Oława, within Oława County, Lower Silesian Voivodeship, in south-western Poland.
