= Marcinkowice, Lower Silesian Voivodeship =

Marcinkowice
- Village
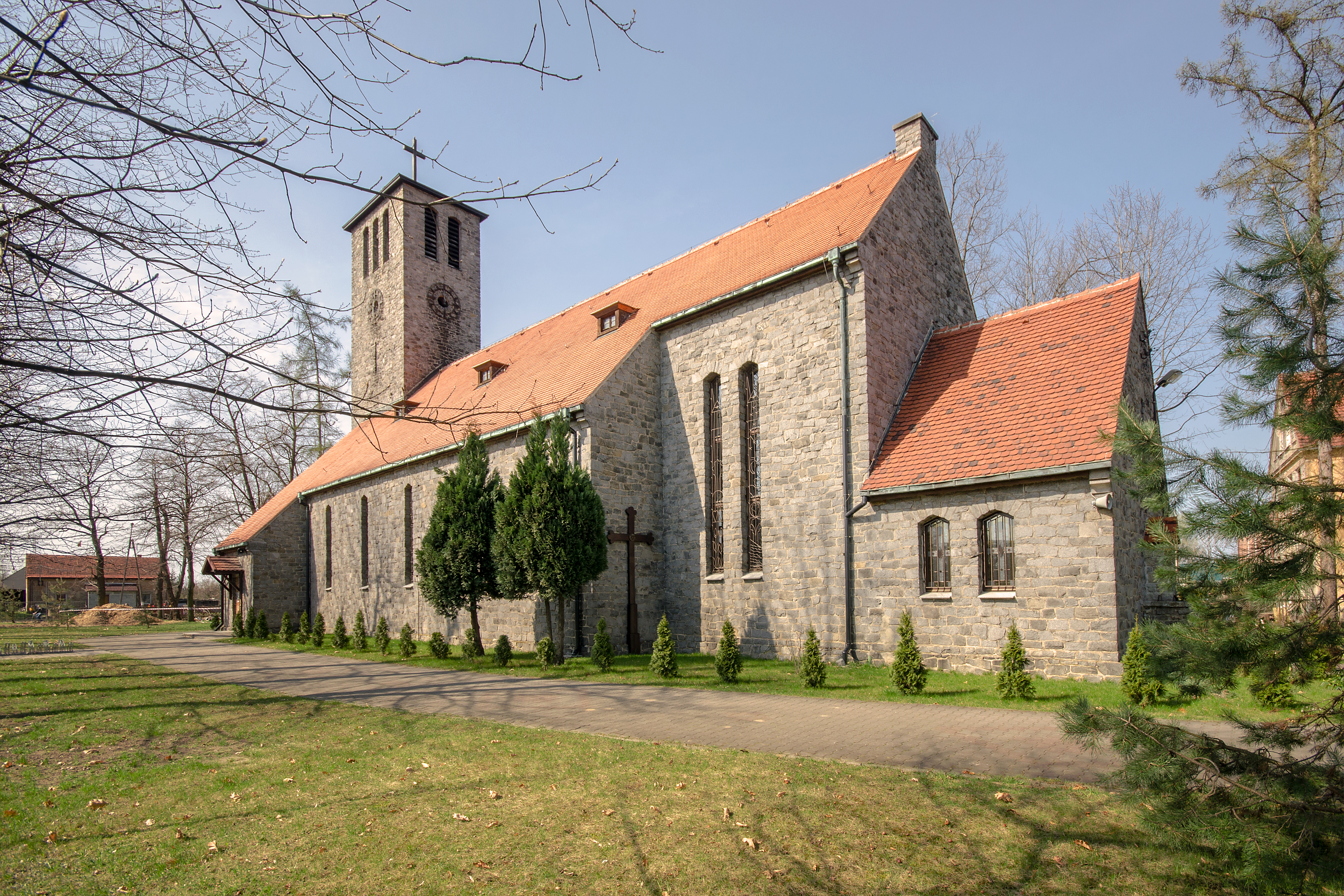
- Saint Martin church in Marcinkowice

- Location within Poland
- Coordinates: 50°59′N 17°14′E
- Country: Poland
- Voivodeship: Lower Silesian
- County: Oława
- Gmina: Oława

Population (approx.)
  - Total: 1,300
- Time zone: UTC+1 (CET)
  - Summer (DST): UTC+2 (CEST)
- Vehicle registration: DOA

Marcinkowice [mart͡ɕiŋkɔˈvit͡sɛ] is a village in the administrative district of Gmina Oława, within Oława County, Lower Silesian Voivodeship, in south-western Poland.

During World War I, the Germans operated a forced labour camp for Allied prisoners of war at a local chemical factory.

== Sports ==
The local football team is Sokół Marcinkowice.
