= Miłonów =

- Village
- Location within Poland
- Coordinates: 50°56′32″N 17°11′58″E
- Country: Poland
- Voivodeship: Lower Silesian
- County: Oława
- Gmina: Oława

Population
  - Total: 50
- Time zone: UTC+1 (CET)
  - Summer (DST): UTC+2 (CEST)
- Vehicle registration: DOA

Miłonów [miˈwɔnuf] is a village in the administrative district of Gmina Oława, within Oława County, Lower Silesian Voivodeship, in south-western Poland.
