= Jankowice, Lower Silesian Voivodeship =

Jankowice
- Village
- Location within Poland
- Coordinates: 50°59′41″N 17°11′45″E
- Country: Poland
- Voivodeship: Lower Silesian
- County: Oława
- Gmina: Oława

Jankowice ([jankɔˈvit͡sɛ]) is a village in the administrative district of Gmina Oława, within Oława County, Lower Silesian Voivodeship, in south-western Poland.
