= Bystrzyca, Oława County =

Bystrzyca
- Village
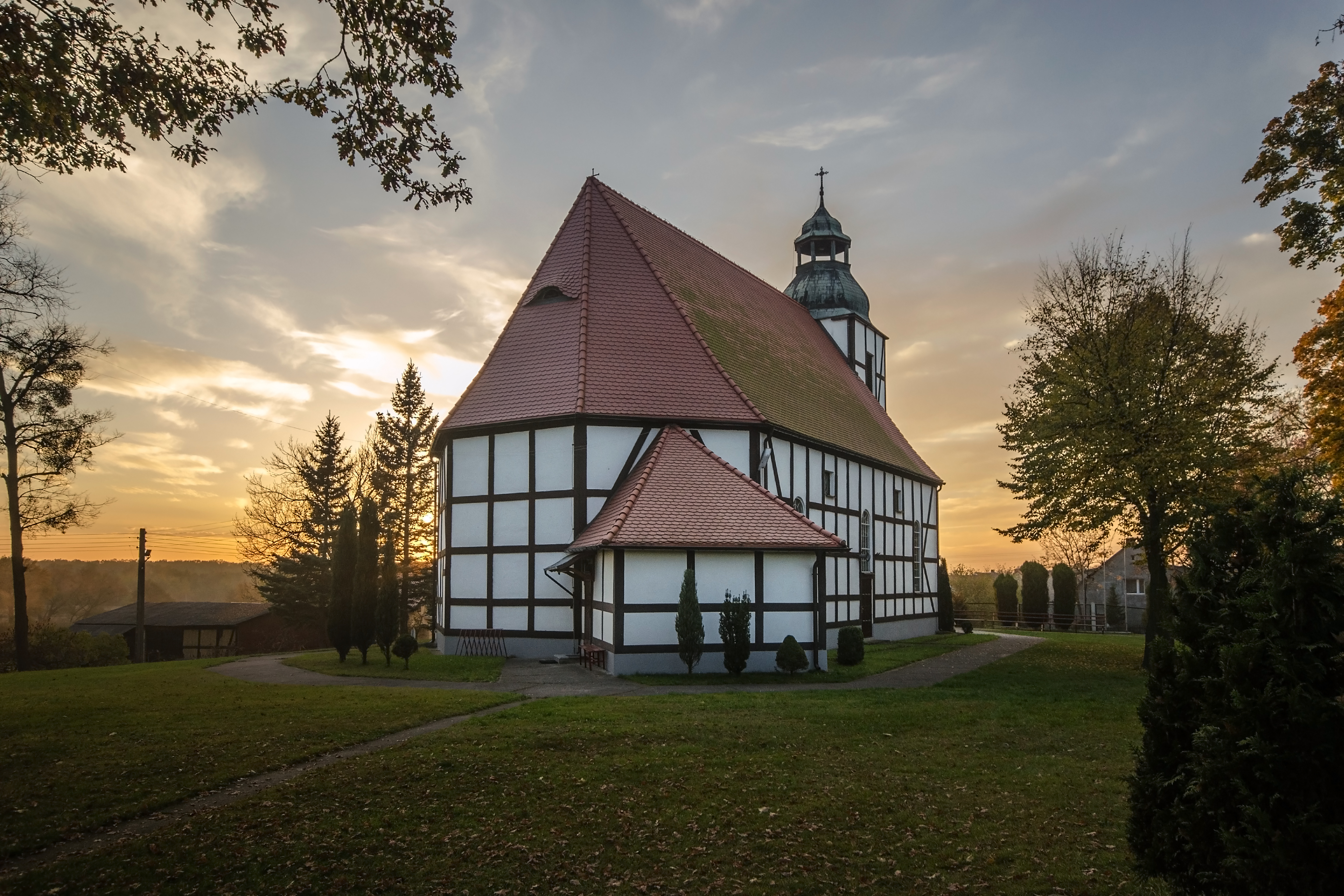
- Our Lady of the Angels church in Bystrzyca

- Location within Poland
- Coordinates: 50°57′42″N 17°23′34″E
- Country: Poland
- Voivodeship: Lower Silesian
- County: Oława
- Gmina: Oława
- Time zone: UTC+1 (CET)
  - Summer (DST): UTC+2 (CEST)
- Vehicle registration: DOA

Bystrzyca [bɨsˈtʂɨt͡sa] is a village in the administrative district of Gmina Oława, within Oława County, Lower Silesian Voivodeship, in south-western Poland.

== History ==
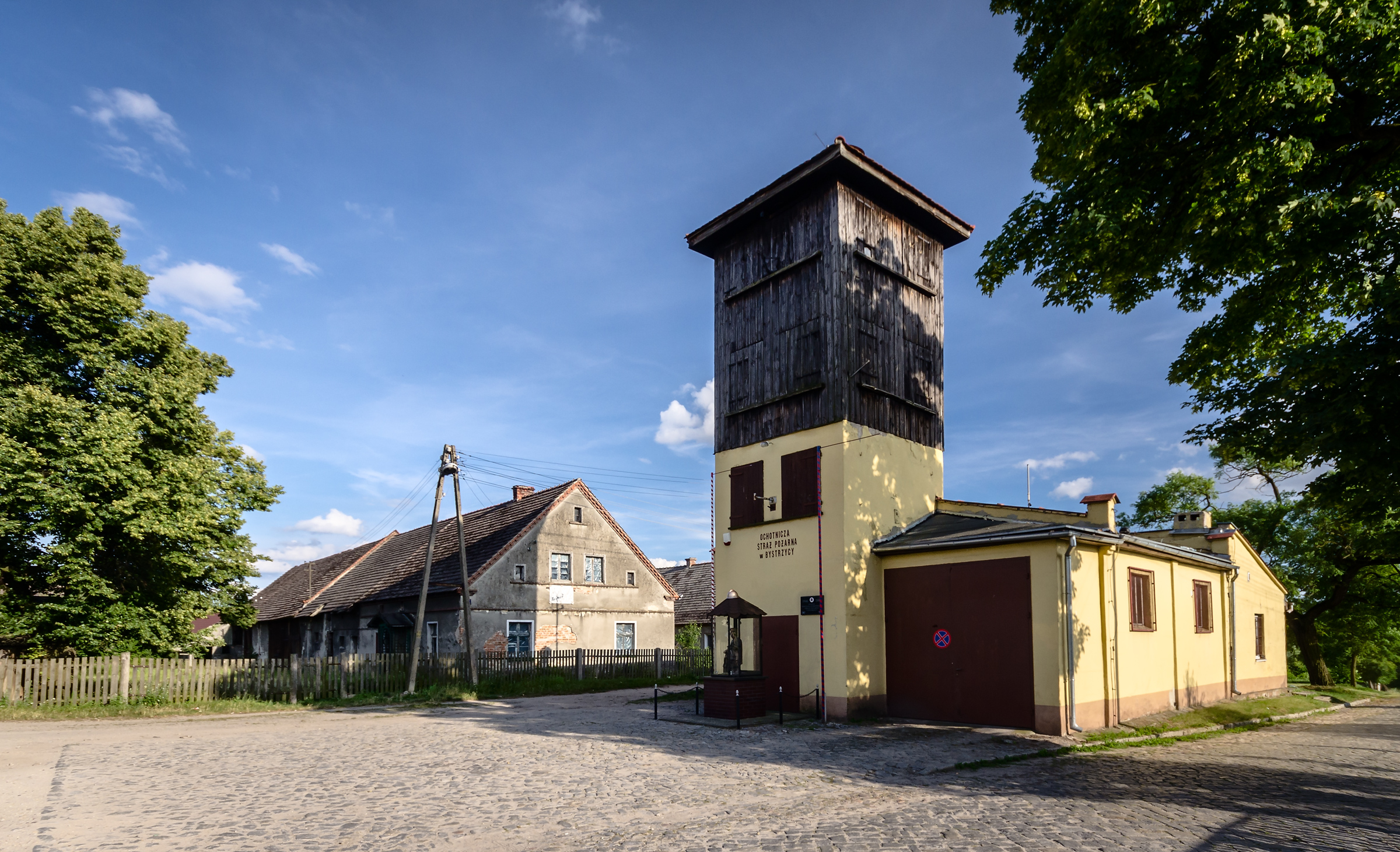
Volunteer fire department in Bystrzyca

The village dates back to the Middle Ages, and, according to linguist Heinrich Adamy, its name comes from the Polish word bystry. Within medieval Piast-ruled Poland, it was the location of a motte-and-bailey castle from the 10th-13th century, which is now an archaeological site. In the 2000s, archaeologists found remains of medieval pagan and Christian burials at the site. Later on, the village was part of Bohemia (Czechia), Prussia and Germany. During World War II, the German administration operated a forced labour camp for Jewish men and women in the village from 1941 to 1944. After Germany's defeat in the war, in 1945, the village became again part of Poland.

In 1986, the Polish film Train to Hollywood was shot in Bystrzyca.

== Manor ==
The manor of Reitzau was built in the baroque style between 1720 and 1730, replacing an earlier hunting lodge. It was owned respectively by the noble families Von Prittwitz, Von Münster and Von Ripperda-Cosyn. The house was burnt down by the Red Army in 1945 and was subsequently raised.

== Sports ==
The local football club is Burza Bystrzyca. It competes in the lower leagues.
