= Gać, Lower Silesian Voivodeship =

Gać
- Village
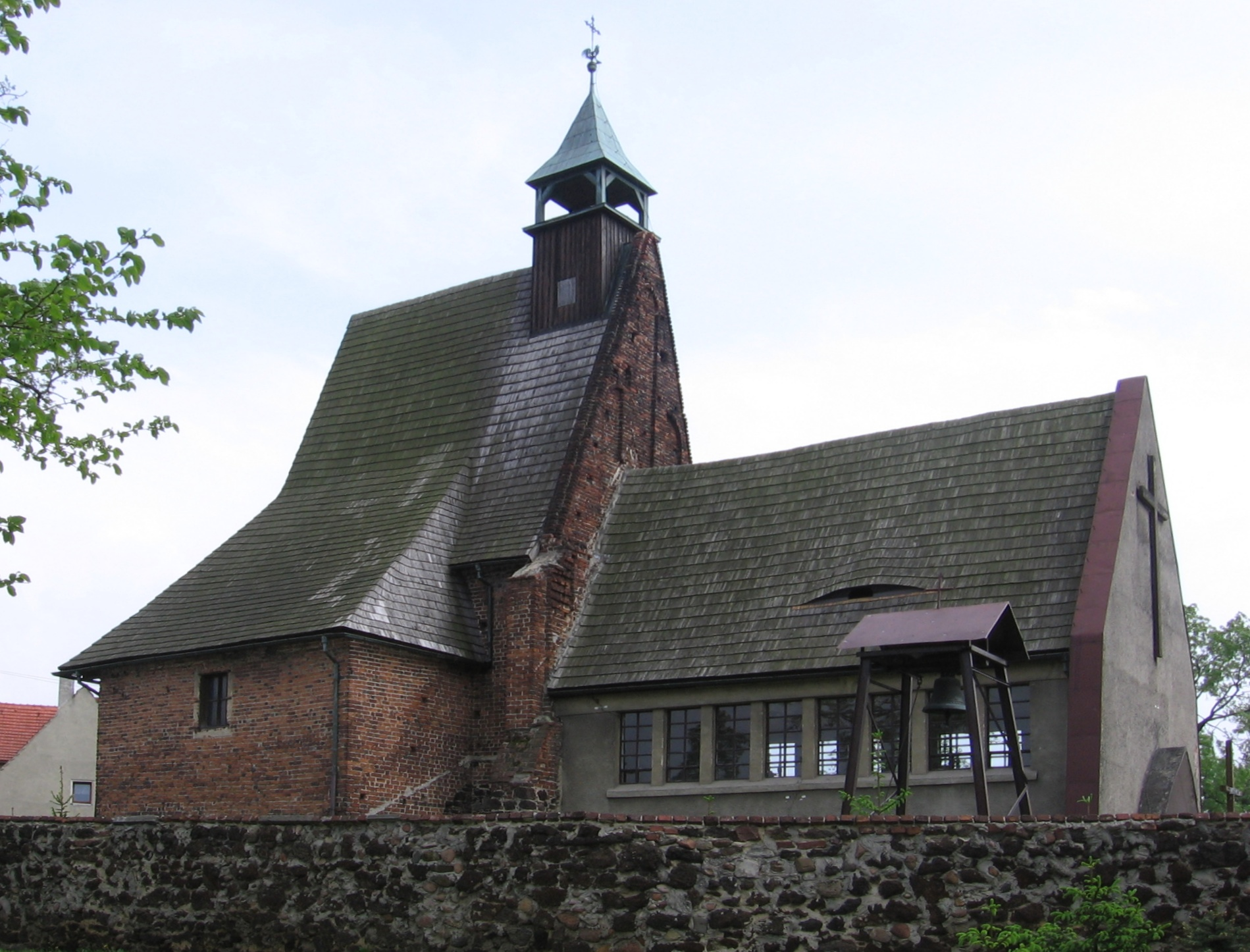
- Exaltation of the Holy Cross church in Gać

- Location within Poland
- Coordinates: 50°53′12″N 17°21′57″E
- Country: Poland
- Voivodeship: Lower Silesian
- County: Oława
- Gmina: Oława

Population
  - Total: 449
- Time zone: UTC+1 (CET)
  - Summer (DST): UTC+2 (CEST)
- Postal code: 55-200
- Vehicle registration: DOA
- Website: http://gac.ovh.org/

Gać (Polish pronunciation: [ɡat͡ɕ]) is a village in the administrative district of Gmina Oława, within Oława County, Lower Silesian Voivodeship, in southwestern Poland.

== Sport ==
The village is represented by the football club Błyskawica Gać. Both the village’s sports hall and local primary school have been named after the former Polish international football player Włodzimierz Lubański.
