= Kończyce, Lower Silesian Voivodeship =

Kończyce
- Village
- Location within Poland
- Coordinates: 50°52′N 17°7′E
- Country: Poland
- Voivodeship: Lower Silesian
- County: Oława
- Gmina: Domaniów

Kończyce [kɔɲˈt͡ʂɨt͡sɛ] is a village in the administrative district of Gmina Domaniów, within Oława County, Lower Silesian Voivodeship, in southwestern Poland.
