= Gaj Oławski =

- Village
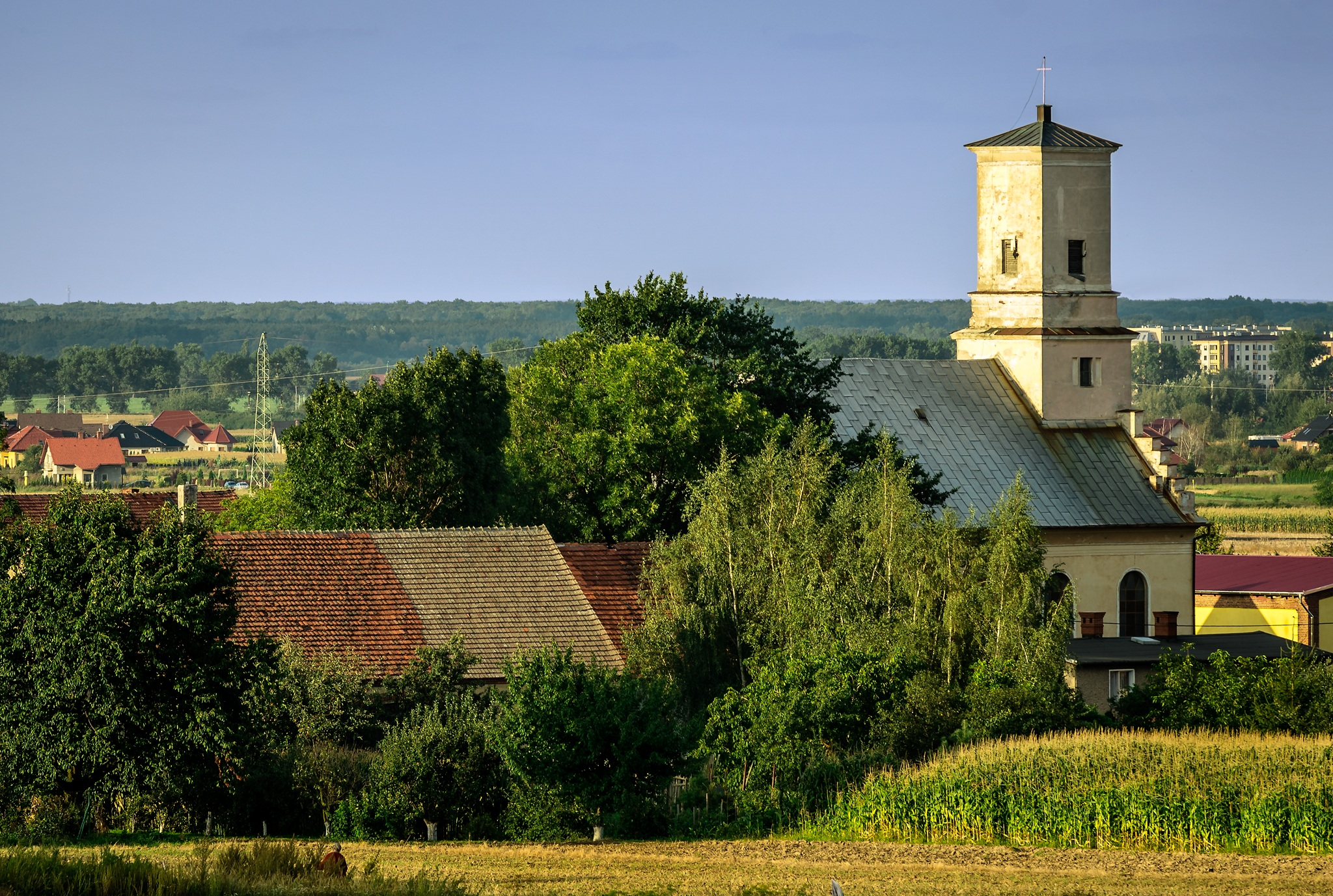

- Location within Poland
- Coordinates: 50°55′34″N 17°14′35″E
- Country: Poland
- Voivodeship: Lower Silesian
- County: Oława
- Gmina: Oława

Gaj Oławski (Polish pronunciation: [ˈɡaj ɔˈwafskʲi]) is a village in the administrative district of Gmina Oława, within Oława County, Lower Silesian Voivodeship, in south-western Poland.
