= Owczary, Oława County =

Owczary
- Village
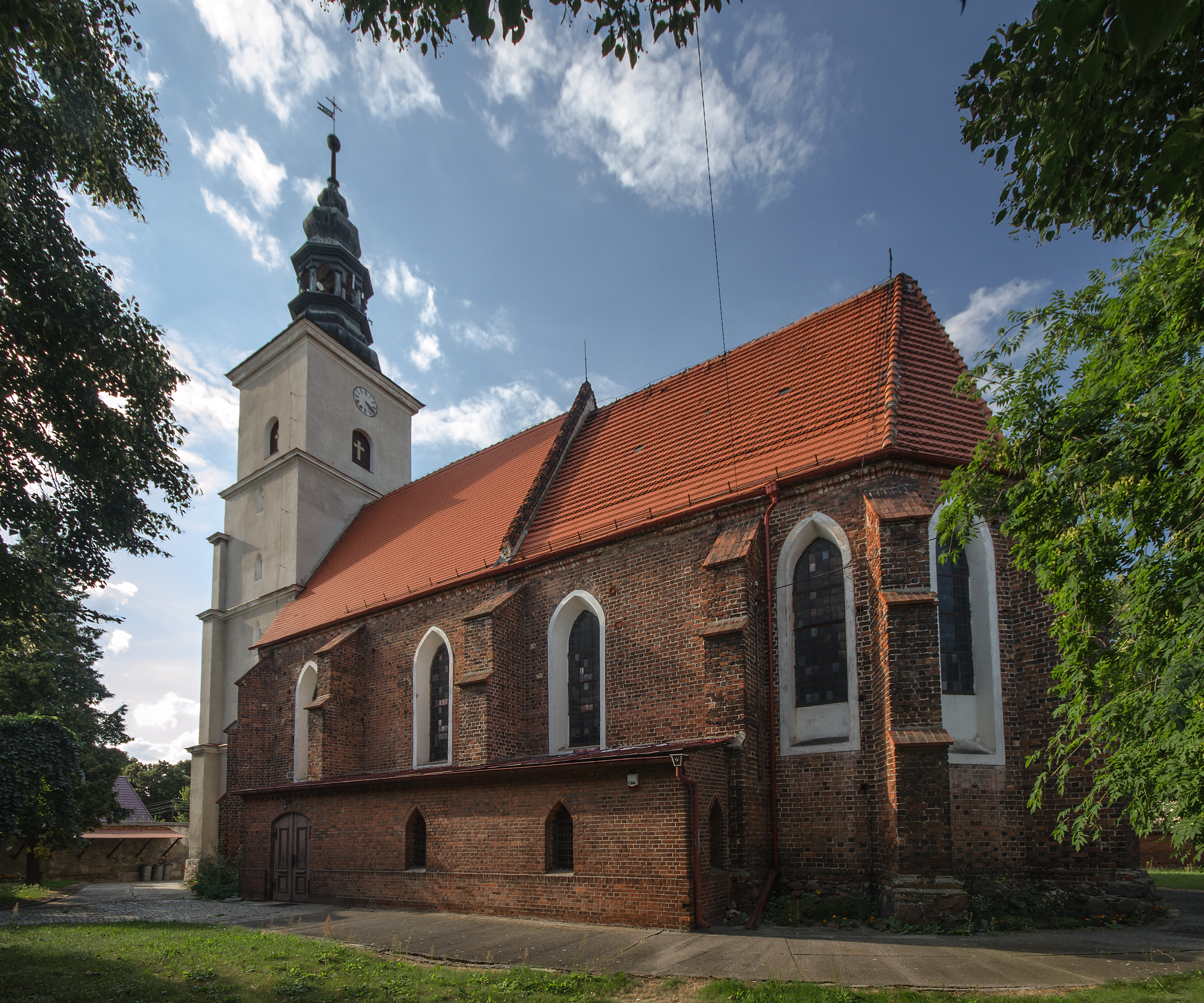
- Catholic church

- Location within Poland
- Coordinates: 50°50′N 17°19′E
- Country: Poland
- Voivodeship: Lower Silesian
- County: Oława
- Gmina: Oława

Owczary [ɔfˈt͡ʂarɨ] is a village in the administrative district of Gmina Oława, within Oława County, Lower Silesian Voivodeship, in south-western Poland.
