= Kuchary, Oława County =

Kuchary
- Village
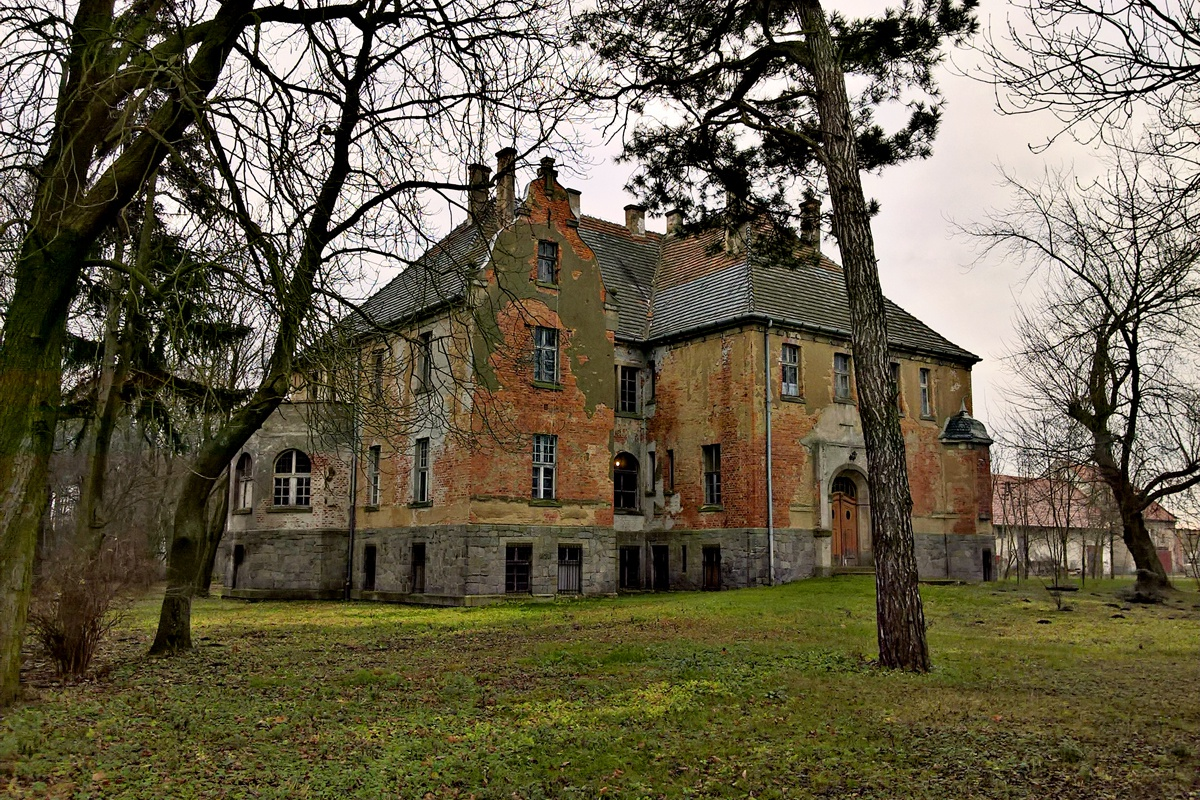
- Manor

- Location within Poland
- Coordinates: 50°53′N 17°5′E
- Country: Poland
- Voivodeship: Lower Silesian
- County: Oława
- Gmina: Domaniów

Kuchary [kuˈxarɨ] is a village in the administrative district of Gmina Domaniów, within Oława County, Lower Silesian Voivodeship, in south-western Poland. The population in 21 people.
