= Domaniówek =

- Village
- Location within Poland
- Coordinates: 50°52′39″N 17°08′55″E
- Country: Poland
- Voivodeship: Lower Silesian
- County: Oława
- Gmina: Domaniów

Domaniówek [dɔmaˈɲuvɛk] is a village in the administrative district of Gmina Domaniów, within Oława County, Lower Silesian Voivodeship, in south-western Poland.
