= Osiek, Oława County =

Osiek
- Village
- Location within Poland
- Coordinates: 50°54′N 17°18′E
- Country: Poland
- Voivodeship: Lower Silesian
- County: Oława
- Gmina: Oława
- Population: 670

Osiek [ˈɔɕɛk] is a village in the administrative district of Gmina Oława, within Oława County, Lower Silesian Voivodeship, in south-western Poland.
