= Niemil =

- Village
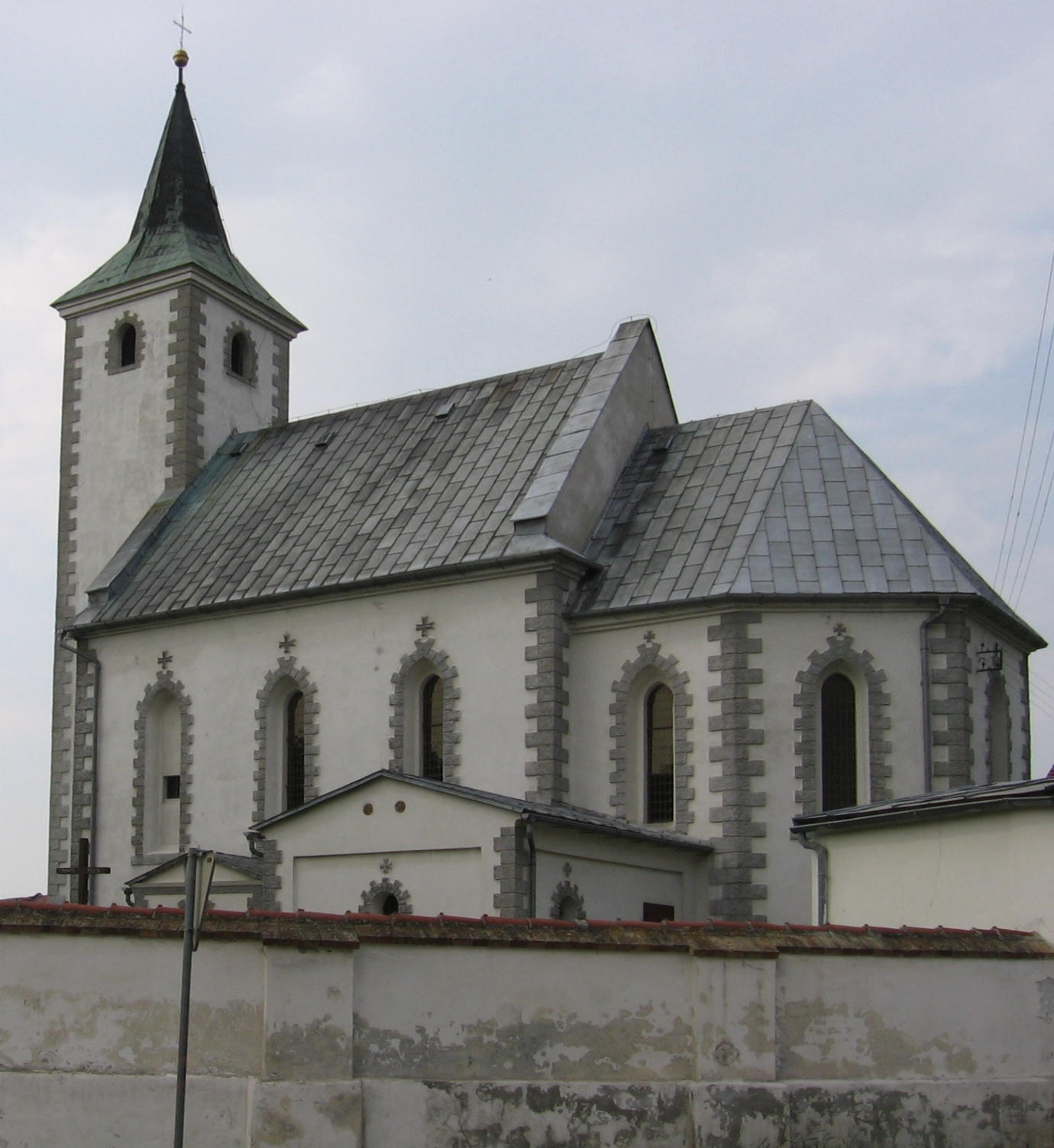
- Catholic church

- Location within Poland
- Coordinates: 50°52′N 17°17′E
- Country: Poland
- Voivodeship: Lower Silesian
- County: Oława
- Gmina: Oława

Niemil [ˈɲɛmil] is a village in the administrative district of Gmina Oława, within Oława County, Lower Silesian Voivodeship, in south-western Poland.

== Notable residents ==
- Rudolf Vesper (born 1939), Olympic wrestler
