= Psary, Oława County =

Psary
- Village
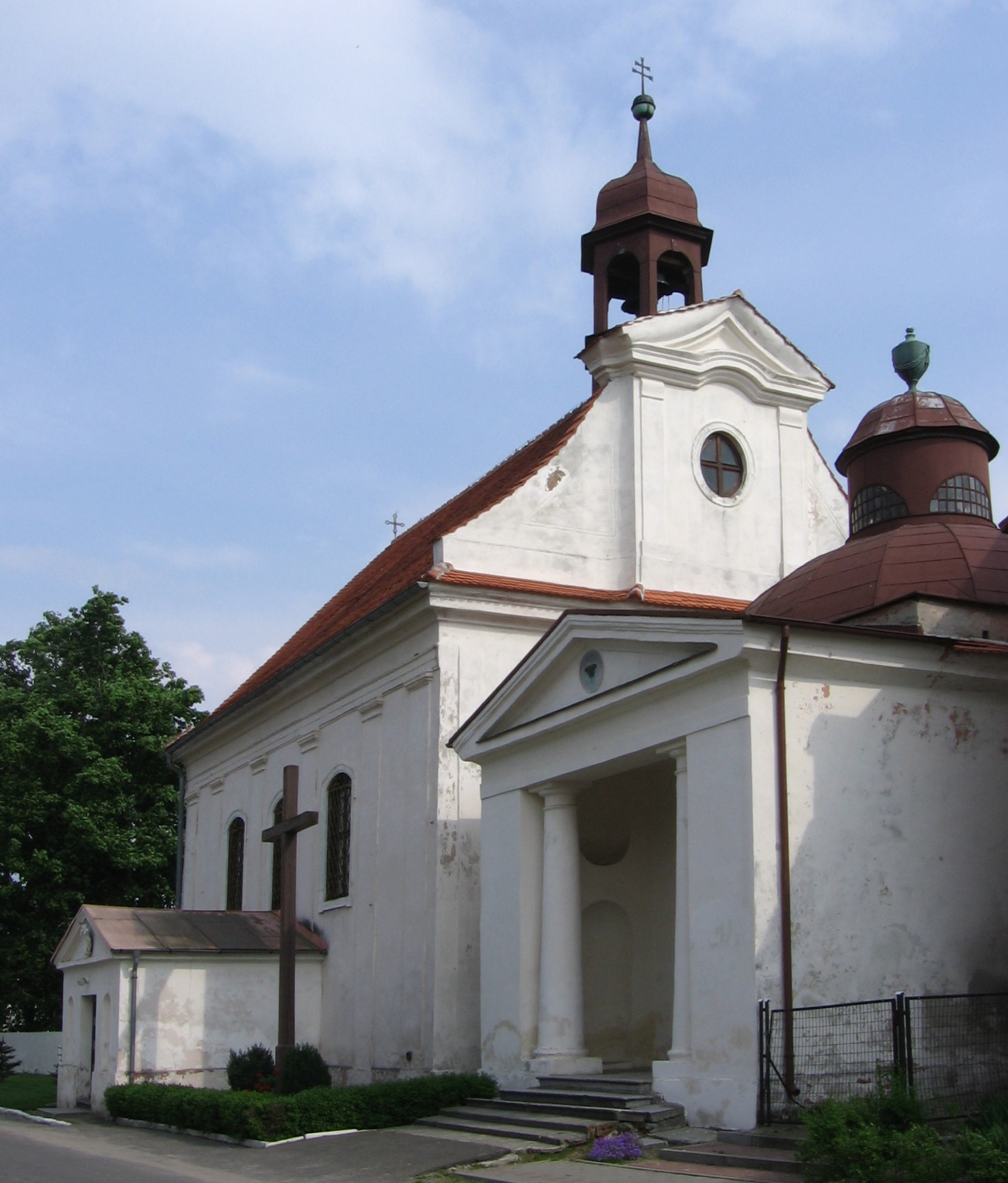
- Church

- Location within Poland
- Coordinates: 50°52′07″N 17°21′44″E
- Country: Poland
- Voivodeship: Lower Silesian
- County: Oława
- Gmina: Oława
- Population: 280

Psary [ˈpsarɨ] is a village in the administrative district of Gmina Oława, within Oława County, Lower Silesian Voivodeship, in south-western Poland.
