= Stanowice, Oława County =

Stanowice
- Village
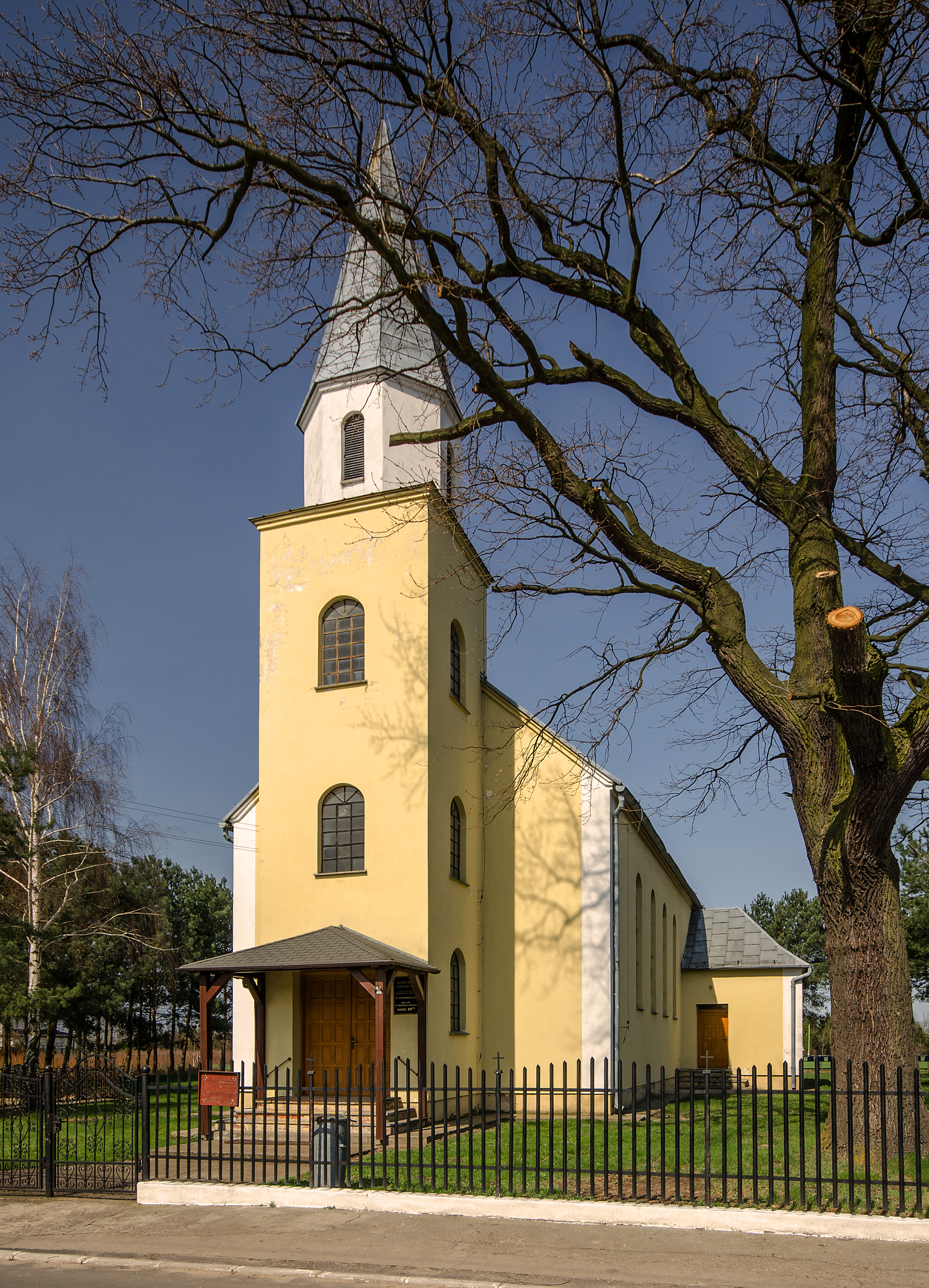
- Our Lady Help of Christians church

- Location within Poland
- Coordinates: 50°58′N 17°16′E
- Country: Poland
- Voivodeship: Lower Silesian
- County: Oława
- Gmina: Oława

Stanowice [stanɔˈvit͡sɛ] is a village in the administrative district of Gmina Oława, within Oława County, Lower Silesian Voivodeship, in south-western Poland.
