= Gostkowice =

Gostkowice may refer to the following places in Poland:

- Gostkowice, Lower Silesian Voivodeship (south-west Poland)
- Gostkowice, Lubusz Voivodeship (west Poland)
