= Teodorów, Oława County =

Teodorów
- Village
- Location within Poland
- Coordinates: 50°57′40″N 17°9′46″E
- Country: Poland
- Voivodeship: Lower Silesian
- County: Oława
- Gmina: Domaniów

Teodorów [tɛɔˈdɔruf] is a village in the administrative district of Gmina Domaniów, within Oława County, Lower Silesian Voivodeship, in south-western Poland.
