= Ścinawa, Oława County =

Ścinawa
- Village
- Location within Poland
- Coordinates: 50°55′6″N 17°20′33″E
- Country: Poland
- Voivodeship: Lower Silesian
- County: Oława
- Gmina: Oława

Ścinawa (Polish pronunciation: [ɕt͡ɕiˈnava]) is a village in the administrative district of Gmina Oława, within Oława County, Lower Silesian Voivodeship, in south-western Poland.
