= Rudolf Vesper =

East German wrestler (born 1939)

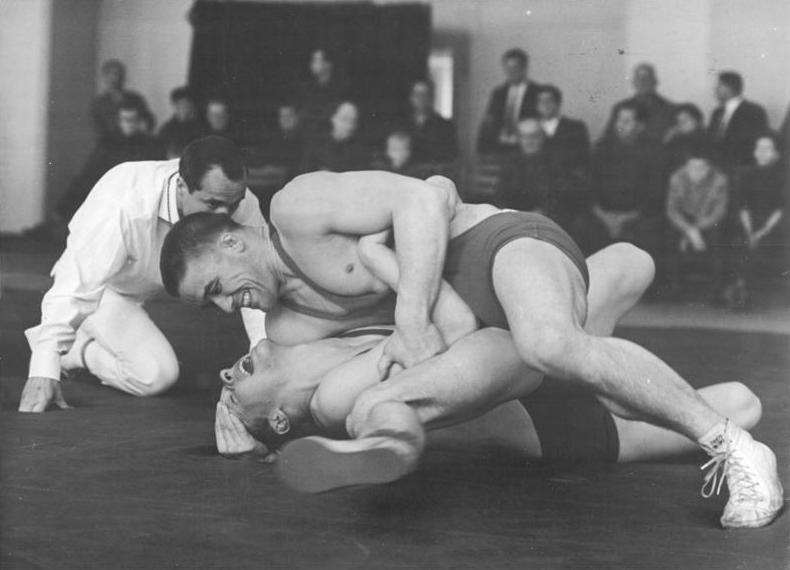
- Rudolf Vesper wrestling Gerd Dietze in 1968

Medal record

Men's Greco-Roman wrestling

Representing East Germany

Olympic Games
Gold medal – first place	1968 Mexico City	78 kg

World Championships
Silver medal – second place	1963 Helsingborg	Welterweight
Silver medal – second place	1967 Bucharest	Welterweight

Rudolf Vesper (born 3 April 1939) is a former Olympic wrestler for East Germany. Born in Niehmen, Lower Silesia, Vesper competed for the Unified German team in the 1964 Summer Olympics in Tokyo, and then East Germany in 1968 in Mexico City. Both times, he competed in the men's welterweight division of the Greco-Roman wrestling event.

The first time Vesper competed, in 1964, he did not win a medal. However, the second time, in 1968, Vesper won a gold medal in the Greco-Roman wrestling event.

Vesper also competed for East Germany in the FILA Wrestling World Championships. Upon his first appearance, 1963, in Helsingborg, he came in second in the Greco-Roman event. He competed in the 78kg weight class and the Seniors age group. His second appearance, in 1967, held in Bucharest, also resulted in a silver medal in the Greco-Roman event. He competed in the Seniors age group and the 78 kg weight class.

== Sources ==
- Rudolf Vesper at the International Wrestling Database
- Rudolf Vesper at Olympedia
- "Rudolf Vesper Biography and Statistics". sports-reference.com. Sports Reference LLC. Archived from the original on 2020-04-17.
- "Vesper, Rudolf (GDR)". Wrestling Database. IAT.
