= Domaniów, Lower Silesian Voivodeship =

Domaniów
- Village
- Location within Poland
- Coordinates: 50°53′38″N 17°07′44″E
- Country: Poland
- Voivodeship: Lower Silesian
- County: Oława
- Gmina: Domaniów
- Elevation: 140 m (460 ft)

Domaniów [dɔˈmaɲuf] is a village in Oława County, Lower Silesian Voivodeship, in south-western Poland. It is the seat of the administrative district (gmina) called Gmina Domaniów.
