= Marcin Nowacki =

Polish footballer (born 1981)

Personal information
- Date of birth: 12 February 1981 (age 45)
- Place of birth: Brzeg, Poland
- Height: 1.68 m (5 ft 6 in)
- Position: Midfielder

Team information
- Current team: Błyskawica Gać (manager)

Youth career
- BTP Brzeg

Senior career*
Years	Team	Apps	(Gls)
2000–2004	Odra Wodzisław	41	(7)
2004–2007	Dyskobolia Grodzisk	36	(0)
2005	→ Obra Kościan (loan)		
2005–2006	→ Korona Kielce (loan)	14	(1)
2007	Odra Wodzisław	28	(4)
2008–2009	Ruch Chorzów	38	(2)
2010–2011	Wisła Płock	43	(10)
2011–2014	Miedź Legnica	60	(7)
2013	→ ROW Rybnik (loan)	9	(0)
2014–2016	MKS Kluczbork	58	(7)
2016–2019	Stal Brzeg	84	(25)
2019	LZS Starowice Dolne	17	(2)
2021	Victoria Kościerzyce	2	(0)
2021	GKS Rychtal	4	(0)
2023	LZS Domaszkowice	1	(0)
2024–2026	Sokół Niemodlin	17	(1)
2026	Sokół Małujowice	6	(4)

International career
2003	Poland U21	3	(1)
2004	Poland	1	(0)

Managerial career
- 2020–2021: GKS Rychtal (player-manager)
- 2021–2022: Stal Brzeg
- 2022–2023: GKS Rychtal
- 2023: LZS Domaszkowice (player-manager)
- 2024–2026: Sokół Niemodlin (player-manager)
- 2026–: Błyskawica Gać
- * Club domestic league appearances and goals

Marcin Nowacki (born 12 February 1981) is a Polish professional football manager and former player who currently manages IV liga Lower Silesia club Błyskawica Gać.

== Career ==
Nowacki was released from Wisła Płock on 30 June 2011. In July 2011, he joined Miedź Legnica.

Nowacki made one appearance for the Poland national team.

== Honours ==
=== Player ===
Dyskobolia Grodzisk Wielkopolski

- Polish Cup: 2006–07
- Ekstraklasa Cup: 2006–07

Miedź Legnica

- II liga West: 2011–12

MKS Kluczbork

- II liga: 2014–15

Stal Brzeg

- Polish Cup (Opole regionals): 2018–19

Sokół Małujowice

- Klasa B Opole IV: 2025–26

Individual

- Polish Newcomer of the Year: 2003

=== Player-manager ===
Sokół Niemodlin

- Klasa A Opole IV: 2023–24
