= Jaczkowice =

- Village
- Location within Poland
- Coordinates: 50°55′0″N 17°16′19″E
- Country: Poland
- Voivodeship: Lower Silesian
- County: Oława
- Gmina: Oława

Jaczkowice ([jat͡ʂkɔˈvit͡sɛ]) is a village in the administrative district of Gmina Oława, within Oława County, Lower Silesian Voivodeship, in south-western Poland.
