= Sobocisko =

- Village
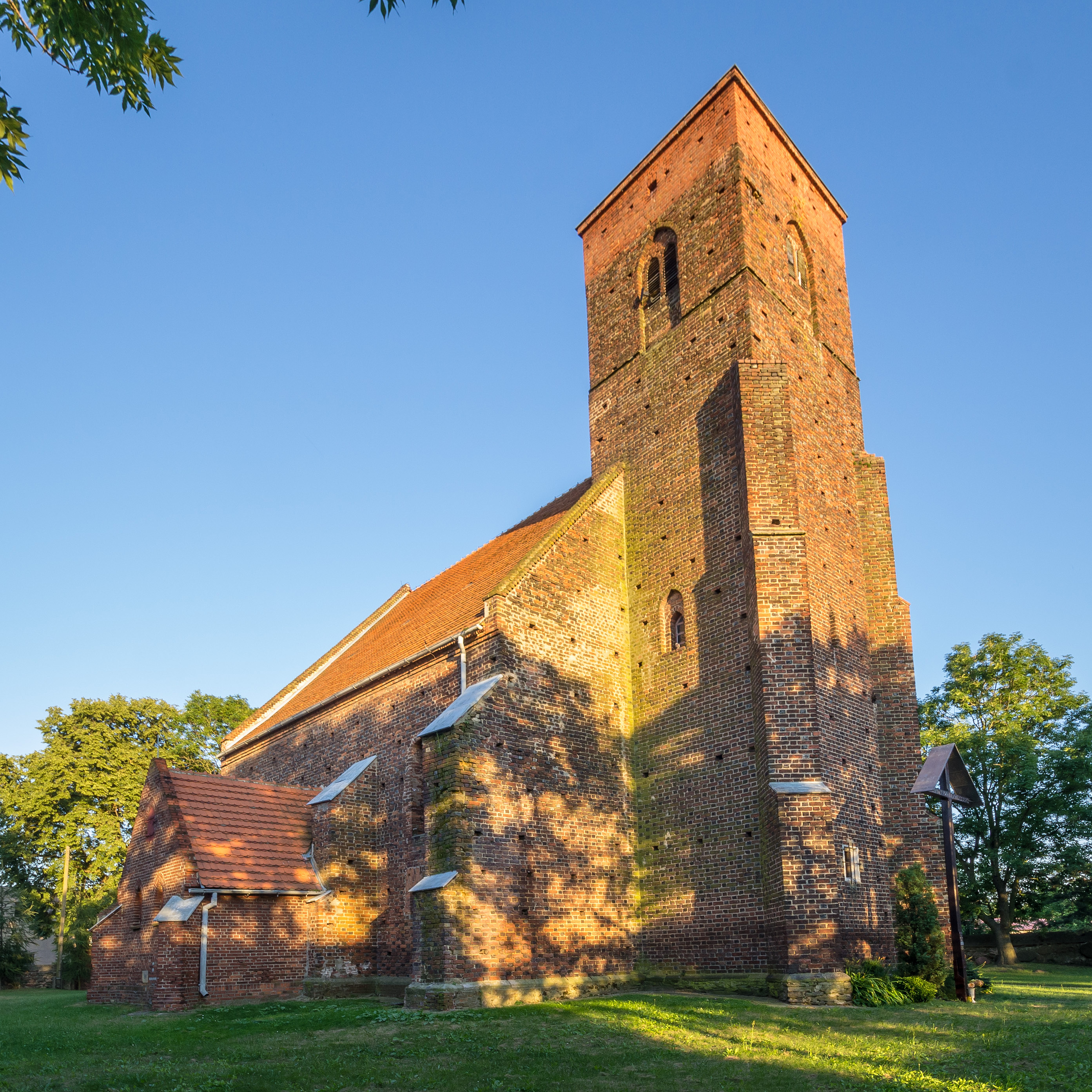
- Church of the Assumption in Sobocisko

- Location within Poland
- Coordinates: 50°57′50″N 17°11′28″E
- Country: Poland
- Voivodeship: Lower Silesian
- County: Oława
- Gmina: Oława
- Population (approx.): 400
- Time zone: UTC+1 (CET)
  - Summer (DST): UTC+2 (CEST)
- Vehicle registration: DOA

Sobocisko [sɔbɔˈt͡ɕiskɔ] is a village in the administrative district of Gmina Oława, within Oława County, Lower Silesian Voivodeship, in south-western Poland.

The village has an approximate population of 400.

The name of the village is of Polish origin and comes from the word soból, which means "sable".

== Sports ==
The local football club is Czarni Sobocisko. It competes in the lower leagues.
