= Błyskawica Gać =

Association football club in Lower Silesia, Poland

- Full name: Ludowy Klub Sportowy Błyskawica Gać
- Nickname: Rycerze Wiosny (transl. The Knights of Spring)
- Founded: 1946; 80 years ago
- Ground: Stadion LKS Błyskawica Gać
- Capacity: 600
- President: Tomasz Luda
- Manager: Marcin Nowacki
- League: IV liga Lower Silesia
- 2025–26: IV liga Lower Silesia, 5th of 18
- Website: LKS Błyskawica Gać on Facebook
colours

Błyskawica Gać is a football club from the Lower Silesian village of Gać in Poland. The club has become well known amongst Polish football fans as a result of the club's supporters regular display of their banner during Polish national team matches. As of the 2026–27 season, they compete in the IV liga Lower Silesia.

== History ==
The current iteration of the club was formed in 1997 as a merger between three local sides Foto-Higiena Oława, Błyskawica Gać and Korona Osiek. The newly formed club inherited the legacy of Błyskawica Gać who were originally founded in 1946 and became affiliated with the Ludowe Zespoły Sportowe in the 1950s.

After finishing top of the IV liga Silesia East and winning a promotion play-off in the 2017–18 season, the club gained promotion to the III liga. Their opening game of the following season was against Ruch Chorzów which, up until that point, was the lowest league game the latter club had contested in their history. During the COVID-19 pandemic, the club was accused of discrimination after having banned residents of the Silesian Voivodeship from attending matches at their home ground prior to a fixture against Ruch Chorzów.

== Club name ==
In 1995, the club’s president, a local entrepreneur named Tomasz Luda, applied to enter a team in the football league pyramid under the name Foto-Higiena Oława. The unusual club prefix, translatable as ‘Photo-Hygiene’, was a result of Luda’s ownership of a local photographic society, meetings of which were held in the premises of his brother’s hygiene supplies business in Oława. After the 1997 merger, the club retained the name Foto-Hygiena, although in 2023, the club announced that they would drop their well known prefix, reverting to their original name of Błyskawica Gać.

== Rivalries ==
The club contest a local derby against Stal Brzeg from the nearby town of Brzeg.

== Supporters ==
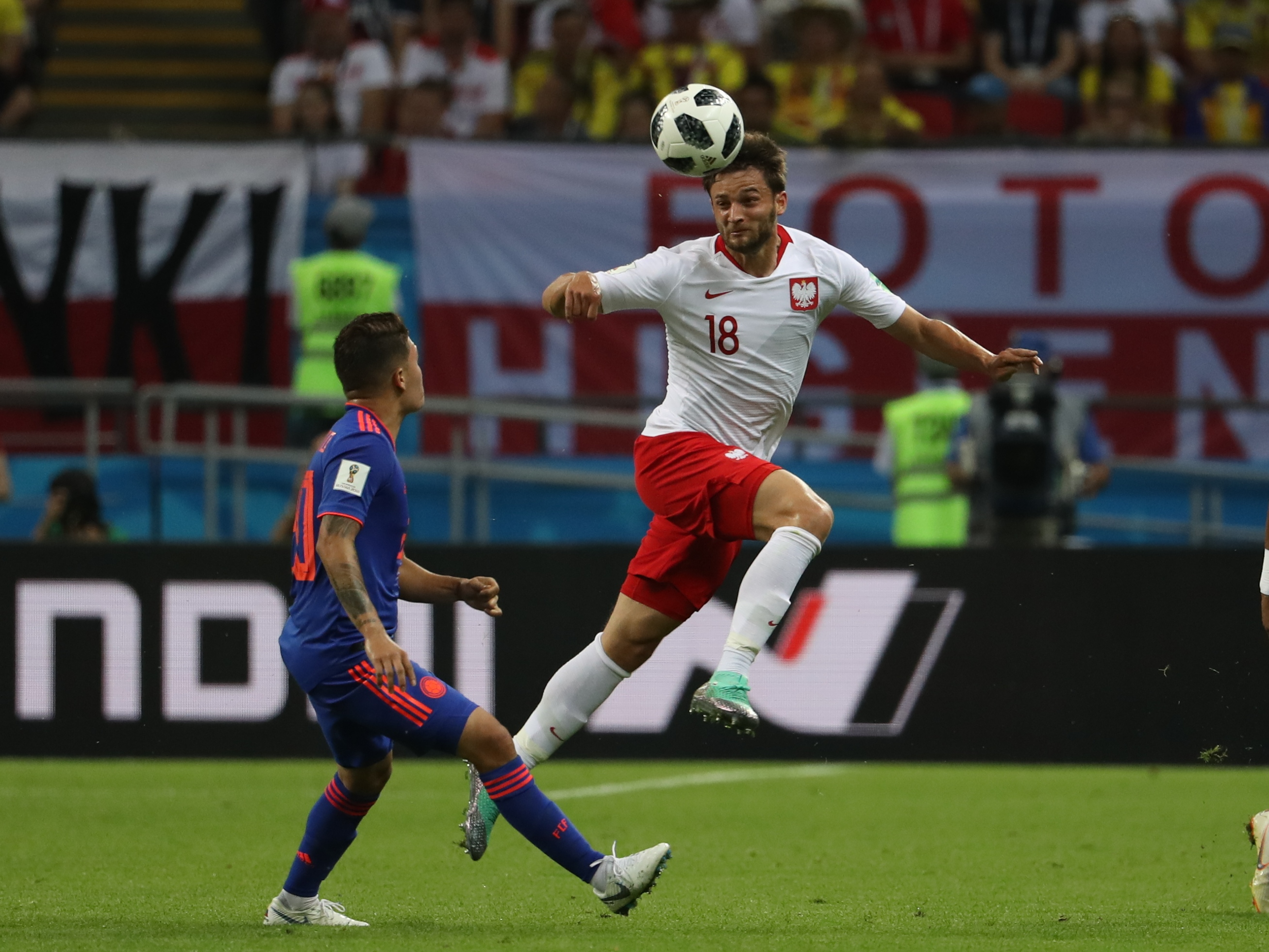
Bartosz Bereszyński leaping for the ball in front of the Foto Higiena flag during a 2018 FIFA World Cup match against Colombia

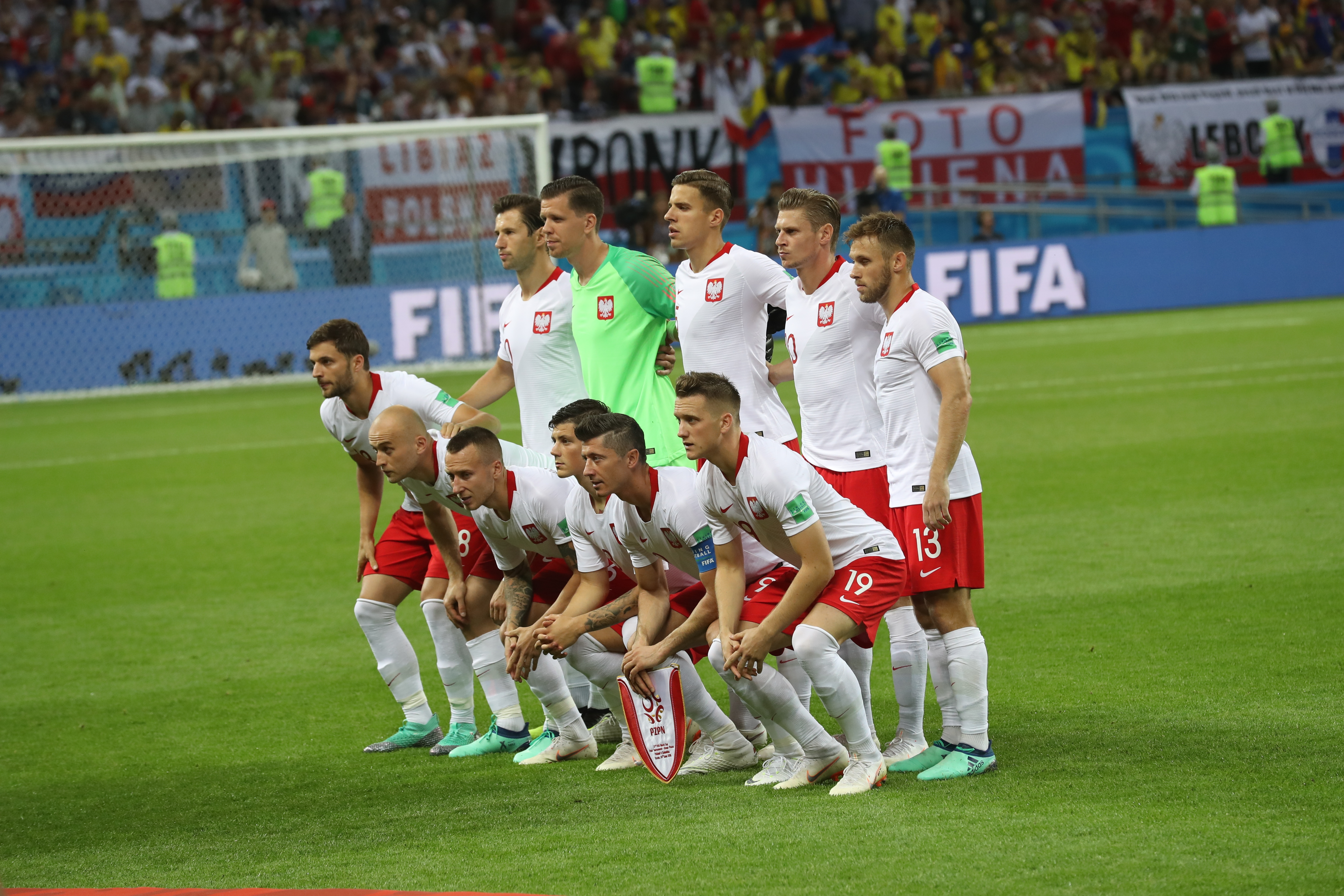
The Foto Higiena flag visible behind the goal as the Poland team pose for a photograph at the Kazan Arena during the 2018 FIFA World Cup

Since the UEFA Euro 2016 supporters of the club have prominently displayed a Polish flag with the words Foto Higiena superimposed on it during matches played by the national team. The flag was also taken to games during the 2022 FIFA World Cup.

In 2018, Maciej Zieliński took to Twitter to complain about the Foto-Higiena banner which he mistook for an advertisement after it had been displayed at a Poland basketball match.
