= Piskorzów =

- Village
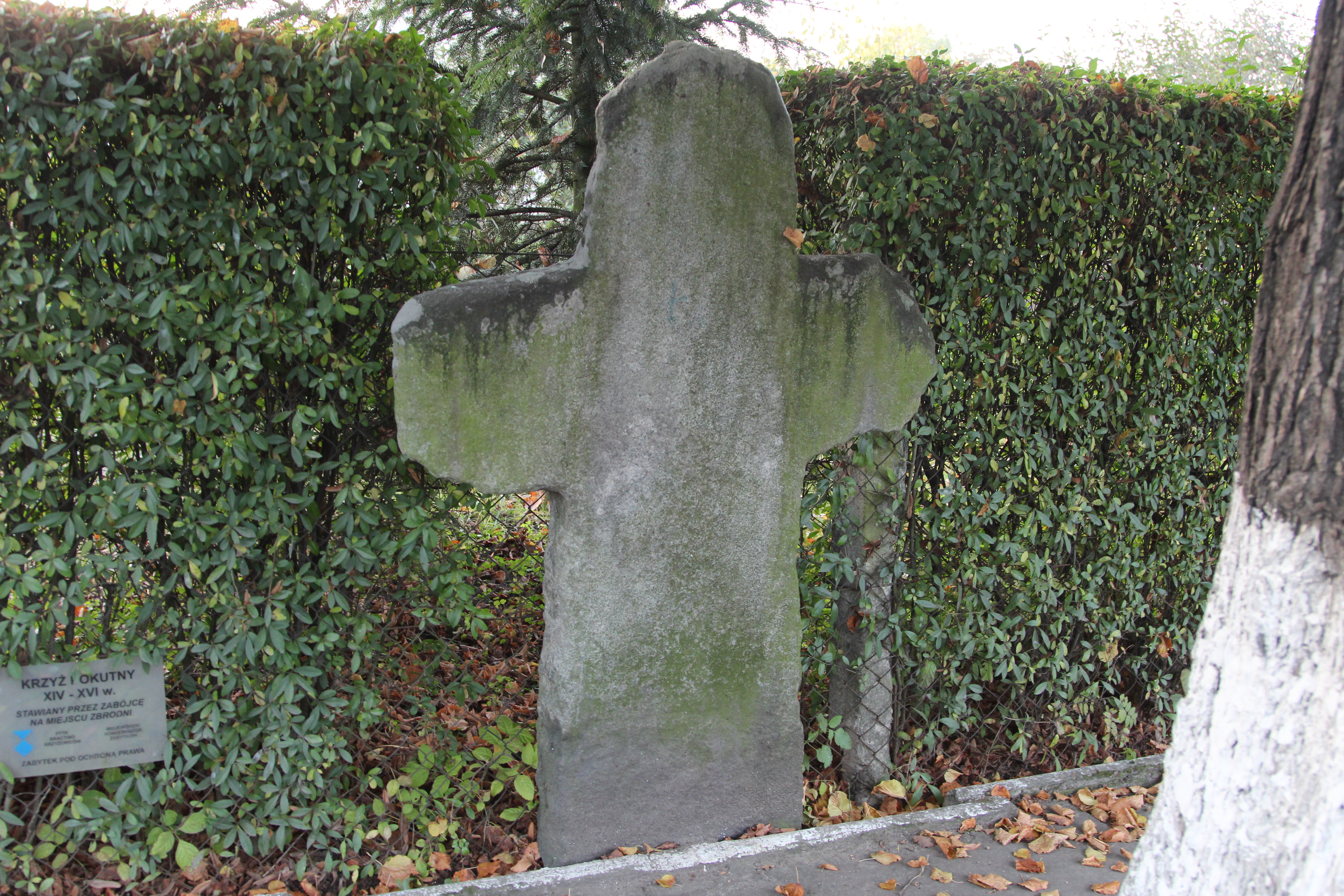
- Medieval stone cross in Piskorzów

- Location within Poland
- Coordinates: 50°55′42″N 17°8′23″E
- Country: Poland
- Voivodeship: Lower Silesian
- County: Oława
- Gmina: Domaniów
- Time zone: UTC+1 (CET)
  - Summer (DST): UTC+2 (CEST)
- Vehicle registration: DOA

Piskorzów [pisˈkɔʐuf] is a village in the administrative district of Gmina Domaniów, within Oława County, Lower Silesian Voivodeship, in south-western Poland.

The name of the village is of Polish origin and comes from the word piskorz, which means "weatherfish".
