= Gostkowice, Lower Silesian Voivodeship =

Gostkowice
- Village
- Location within Poland
- Coordinates: 50°54′28″N 17°05′17″E
- Country: Poland
- Voivodeship: Lower Silesian
- County: Oława
- Gmina: Domaniów

Gostkowice [ɡɔstkɔˈvit͡sɛ] is a village in the administrative district of Gmina Domaniów, within Oława County, Lower Silesian Voivodeship, in south-western Poland.
