= Chwastnica, Lower Silesian Voivodeship =

Chwastnica
- Village
- Location within Poland
- Coordinates: 50°55′34″N 17°07′11″E
- Country: Poland
- Voivodeship: Lower Silesian
- County: Oława
- Gmina: Domaniów

Chwastnica [xfastˈnit͡sa] is a village in the administrative district of Gmina Domaniów, within Oława County, Lower Silesian Voivodeship, in south-western Poland.
