= Gmina Oława =

Commune in Silesia

Gmina Oława Oława Commune
- Gmina
- Coat of arms
- Interactive map of Gmina Oława
- Coordinates (Oława): 50°56′N 17°18′E
- Country: Poland
- Voivodeship: Lower Silesian
- County: Oława
- Seat: Oława

Area
  - Total: 233.98 km^{2} (90.34 sq mi)

Population (2019-06-30)
  - Total: 15,209
  - Density: 65.001/km^{2} (168.35/sq mi)
- Website: https://gminaolawa.pl/

Gmina Oława is a rural gmina (administrative district) in Oława County, Lower Silesian Voivodeship, in south-western Poland. Its seat is the town of Oława, although the town is not part of the territory of the gmina.

The gmina covers an area of 233.98 square kilometres (90.3 sq mi), and as of 2019 its total population was 15,209.

== Neighbouring gminas ==
Gmina Oława is bordered by the town of Oława and the gminas of Czernica, Domaniów, Jelcz-Laskowice, Lubsza, Siechnice, Skarbimierz and Wiązów.

== Villages ==
The gmina contains the villages of Bolechów, Bystrzyca, Chwalibożyce, Drzemlikowice, Gać, Gaj Oławski, Godzikowice, Godzinowice, Jaczkowice, Jakubowice, Janików, Jankowice, Jankowice Małe, Lizawice, Marcinkowice, Marszowice, Maszków, Miłonów, Niemil, Niwnik, Oleśnica Mała, Osiek, Owczary, Psary, Ścinawa, Ścinawa Polska, Siecieborowice, Siedlce, Sobocisko, Stanowice, Stary Górnik, Stary Otok, Zabardowice, and Zakrzów.

== Twin towns – sister cities ==
Gmina Oława is twinned with:

- Pidhaitsi Raion, Ukraine
- Rudamina, Lithuania
