= Gmina Domaniów =

Gmina Domaniów Domaniów Commune
- Gmina
- Coat of arms
- Interactive map of Gmina Domaniów
- Coordinates (Domaniów): 50°53′38″N 17°07′44″E
- Country: Poland
- Voivodeship: Lower Silesian
- County: Oława
- Seat: Domaniów
- Sołectwos: Brzezimierz, Chwastnica, Danielowice, Domaniów, Gęsice, Goszczyna, Grodziszowice, Janków, Kończyce, Kuchary, Kurzątkowice, Pełczyce, Piskorzów, Piskorzówek, Polwica, Radłowice, Radoszkowice, Skrzypnik, Swojków, Wierzbno, Wyszkowice

Area
  - Total: 94.31 km^{2} (36.41 sq mi)

Population (2019-06-30)
  - Total: 5,162
  - Density: 54.73/km^{2} (141.8/sq mi)
- Website: https://gminadomaniow.pl/

Gmina Domaniów is a rural gmina (administrative district) in Oława County, Lower Silesian Voivodeship, in south-western Poland. Its seat is the village of Domaniów, which lies approximately 13 kilometres (8 mi) west of Oława, and 27 kilometres (17 mi) south of the regional capital Wrocław.

The gmina covers an area of 94.31 square kilometres (36.4 sq mi), and as of 2019 its total population was 5,162. It is part of the larger Wrocław metropolitan area.

== Neighbouring gminas ==
Gmina Domaniów is bordered by the gminas of Borów, Oława, Siechnice, Strzelin, Wiązów and Żórawina.

== Villages ==
The gmina contains the villages of Brzezimierz, Chwastnica, Danielowice, Domaniów, Domaniówek, Gęsice, Gostkowice, Goszczyna, Grodziszowice, Janków, Kończyce, Kuchary, Kuny, Kurzątkowice, Pełczyce, Piskorzów, Piskorzówek, Polwica, Radłowice, Radoszkowice, Skrzypnik, Swojków, Teodorów, Wierzbno and Wyszkowice.

== Twin towns – sister cities ==
Gmina Domaniów is twinned with:

- Hagenow-Land, Germany
