= Oława County =

Coordinates: 50°56′N 17°18′E

Oława County Powiat oławski
- County
- Flag Coat of arms

- Location within the voivodeship
- Country: Poland
- Voivodeship: Lower Silesian
- Seat: Oława
- Gminas: Total 4 (incl. 1 urban): Oława; Gmina Domaniów; Gmina Jelcz-Laskowice; Gmina Oława

Area
  - Total: 523.73 km^{2} (202.21 sq mi)

Population (2019-06-30)
  - Total: 76,723
  - Density: 146.49/km^{2} (379.42/sq mi)
  - Urban: 48,832
  - Rural: 27,891
- Car plates: DOA
- Website: www.starostwo.olawa.pl

Oława County (Polish: powiat oławski) is a unit of territorial administration and local government (powiat) in Lower Silesian Voivodeship, south-western Poland. It was created on January 1, 1999 as a result of the Polish local government reforms passed in 1998. The county covers an area of 523.7 square kilometres (202.2 sq mi). Its administrative seat is the town of Oława, and its only other town is Jelcz-Laskowice.

As of 2019 the total population of the county is 76,723, out of which the population of Oława is 33,029, that of Jelcz-Laskowice is 15,803, and the rural population is 27,891.

== Neighbouring counties ==
Oława County is bordered by Oleśnica County to the north, Namysłów County and Brzeg County to the east, Strzelin County to the south-west, and Wrocław County to the north-west.

== Administrative divisions ==
The county is subdivided into four gminas (one urban, one urban-rural and two rural). These are listed in the following table, in descending order of population.

| Gmina | Type | Area (km^{2}) | Population (2019) | Seat |
|---|---|---|---|---|
| Oława | urban | 27.4 | 33,029 | |
| Gmina Jelcz-Laskowice | urban-rural | 168.1 | 23,323 | Jelcz-Laskowice |
| Gmina Oława | rural | 234.0 | 15,209 | Oława* |
| Gmina Domaniów | rural | 94.3 | 5,162 | Domaniów |
* seat not part of the gmina
