= Zerboni =

Zerboni is a surname. Notable people with the surname include:

- Juan José Zerboni (1953–2025), Mexican actor
- McCall Zerboni (born 1986), American soccer player
- Salvador Zerboni (born 1979), Mexican actor

== See also ==
- Joseph Zerboni di Sposetti (1760–1831), German philosopher
- Suvini Zerboni, Italian music publishing company
