= Tomasz Winnicki =

Tomasz Winnicki can mean:

- Tomasz Winnicki (chemist), born 1934
- Tomasz Winnicki (political activist), born 1975
