= Tomasz Winnicki (chemist) =

Polish chemist

Tomasz Winnicki (born 1934 in Lwów) is a Polish chemist, specializing in polymer chemistry and water and wastewater technology, professor of technical sciences, university teacher, organizer and the first rector of the Karkonosze College in Jelenia Góra.

== Biography ==
Winnicki was born in Lwów, from where, after the end of World War II, he moved with his parents to Wrocław in 1945. In 1956 he graduated from the Faculty of Chemistry at the Wrocław University of Technology. Then he obtained doctoral and postdoctoral degrees, and in 1977 he was awarded the title of professor of technical sciences. He completed a one-year research internship at Columbia University in New York. He specializes in issues in the field of polymer chemistry. For about 50 years he was professionally associated with the Wrocław University of Technology.

In 2006, he ran for the Lower Silesia regional council on behalf of the Left and Democrats. He obtained the mandate of a councilor in 2010, replacing Elżbieta Zakrzewska. In 2010, he unsuccessfully applied for re-election on behalf of the Civic Platform.

He was awarded, inter alia, the Knight's Cross of the Order of Polonia Restituta and the Medal of the National Education Commission. Honored with the title of honorary professor of the Lublin University of Technology (2011) and the title of honorary doctor of the Częstochowa University of Technology (2007).
