= Jelenia Góra =

City in Lower Silesian Voivodeship, Poland

- City county
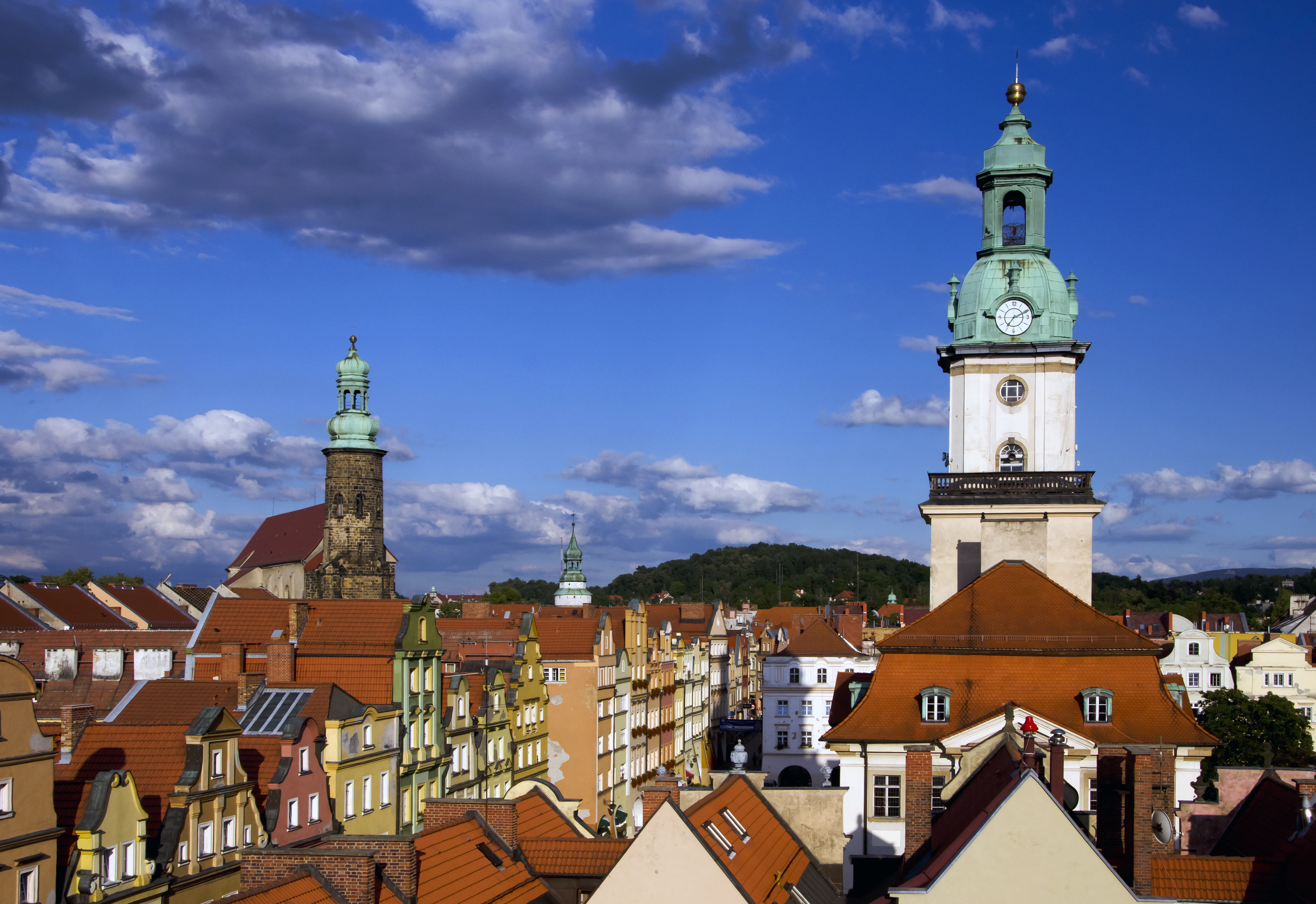
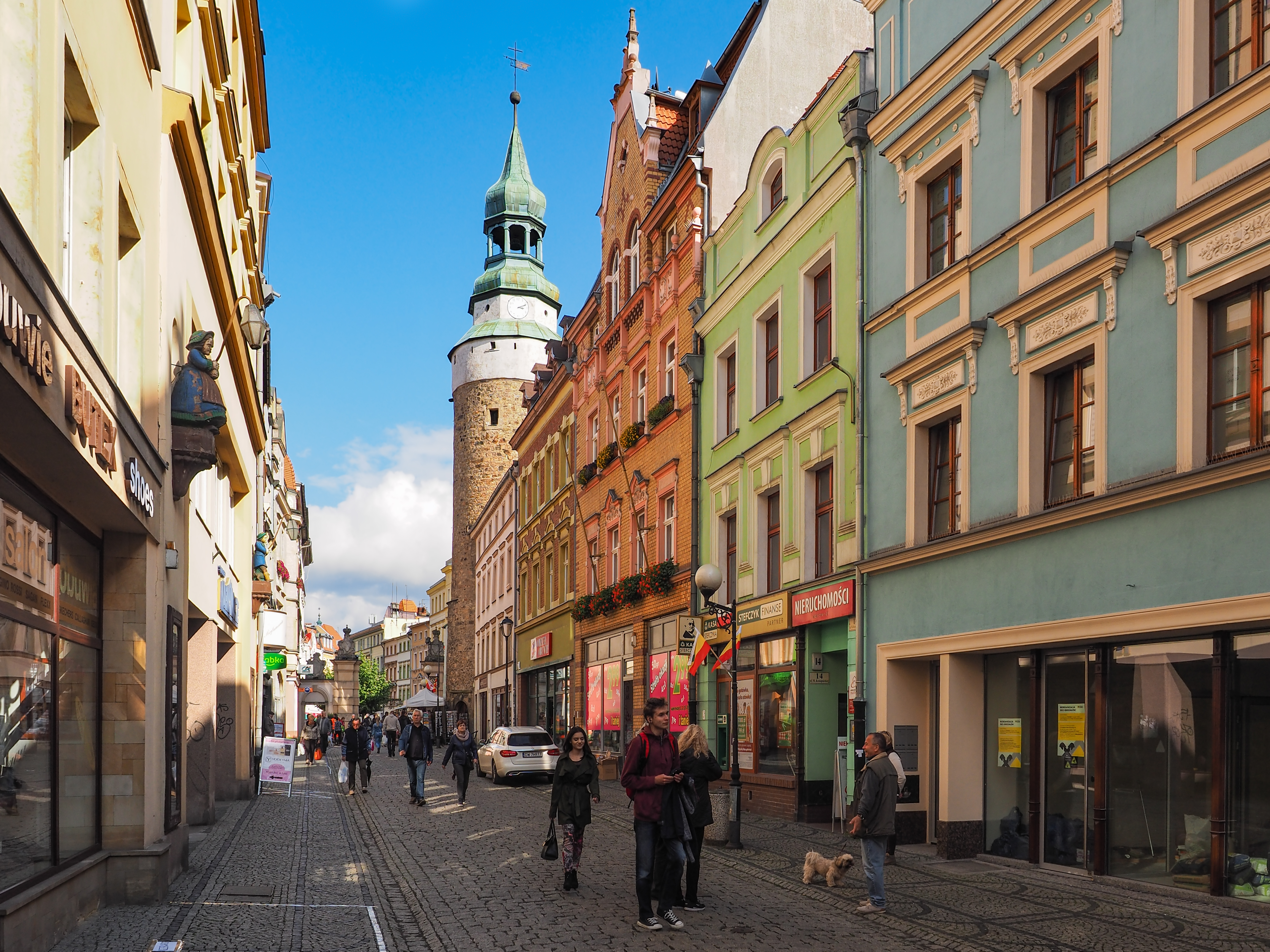
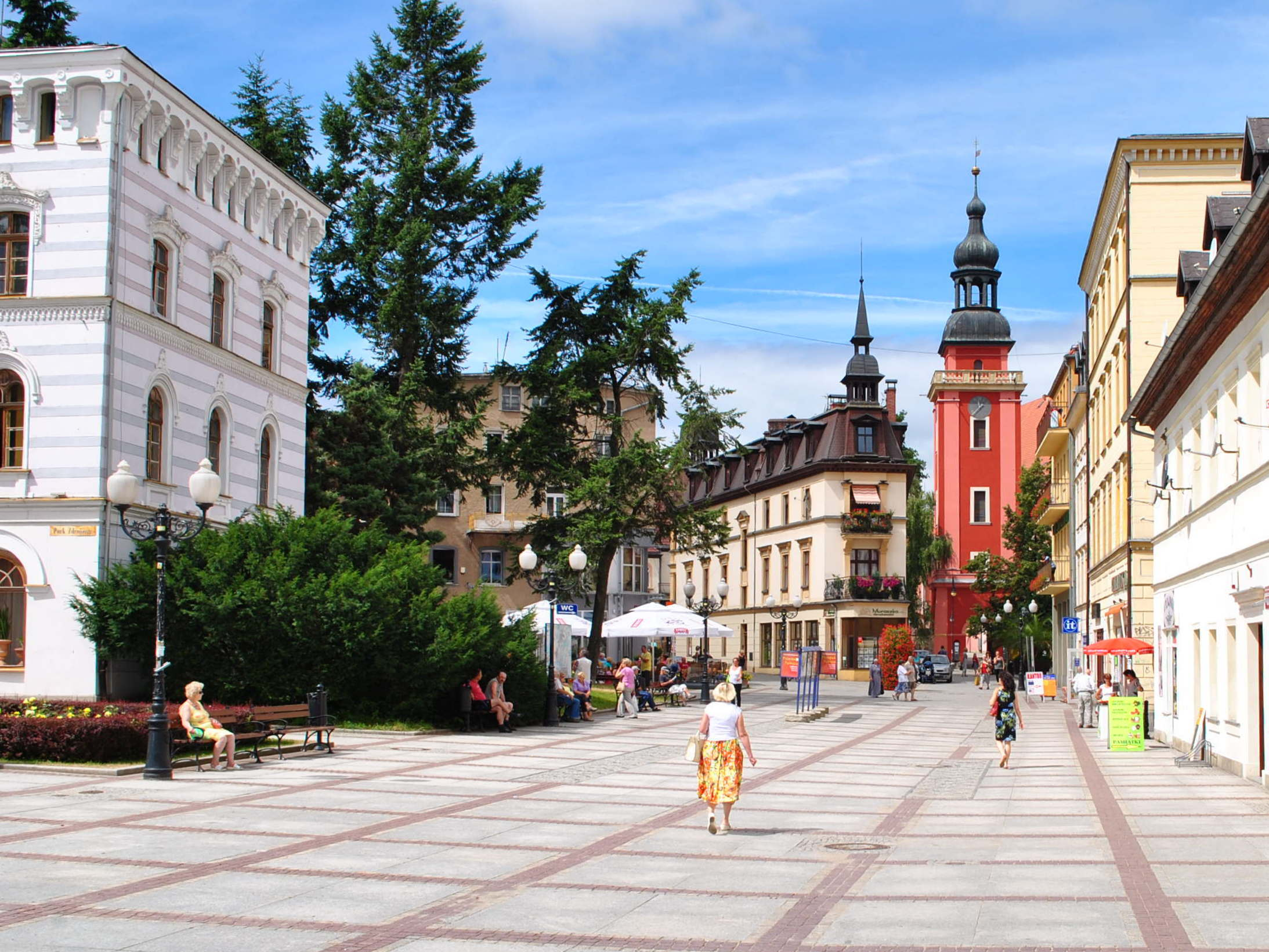
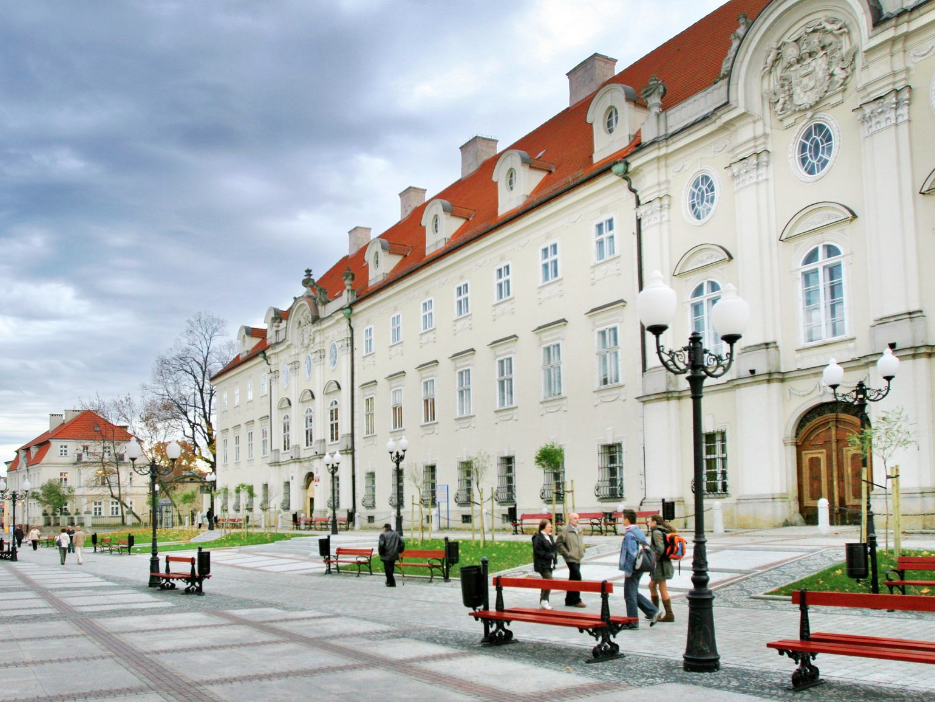
- Old Town and City Hall 1 Maja Street Holy Cross Church Cieplice Śląskie-Zdrój Schaffgotsch Palace

- Flag Coat of arms

- Location within Poland
- Coordinates: 50°54′12″N 15°44′4″E
- Country: Poland
- Voivodeship: Lower Silesian
- Established: 10th century
- City rights: 1288

Government
  - City mayor: Jerzy Łużniak

Area
  - Total: 109.2 km^{2} (42.2 sq mi)
- Elevation: 352.74–1,424 m (1,157.3–4,671.9 ft)

Population (31 December 2024)
  - Total: 74,646 ▼
  - Density: 683.4/km^{2} (1,770/sq mi)
- Time zone: UTC+1 (CET)
  - Summer (DST): UTC+2 (CEST)
- Postal code: 58–500 to 58–588
- Area code: +48 075
- Car plates: DJ
- Website: http://www.jeleniagora.pl/

Jelenia Góra ([jɛˈlɛɲa ˈɡura]; German: Hirschberg; lit. 'deer mountain') is a historic city in southwestern Poland, within the region of Lower Silesia. Jelenia Góra is situated in the Lower Silesian Voivodeship, close to the Karkonosze mountain range, with ski resorts such as Karpacz and Szklarska Poręba situated 10 to 15 kilometres (6 to 9 miles) from the city. Jelenia Góra constitutes a separate urban gmina as well as being the seat of surrounding Karkonosze County. In 2021, the population was 77,366. The area, including the oldest spa district of Cieplice Śląskie-Zdrój, is one of the most valued recreational and leisure locations in Poland.

The city's history dates back to as early as the 10th century, but the settlement was granted town rights under Polish rule in 1288. Jelenia Góra was founded on important trade routes linking the Holy Roman Empire and Bohemia with Eastern Europe. The region flourished as a result of trade privileges that became the basis for the establishment of weaving and mining industries during the Late Middle Ages and early Renaissance periods. Jelenia Góra witnessed many historical conflicts such as the Thirty Years' War and the decisive Silesian Wars. Spared from damage during World War II, the German-speaking population of the city was expelled following 1945 and the city was repopulated by Poles.

The central suburb of Jelenia Góra possesses many historical and architectural structures of great significance, including the 17th-century town hall, baroque churches and a restored central marketplace as well as parks and gardens. The nearby Karkonosze National Park, visited by over 1.5 million tourists annually, has its headquarters in the southwestern neighbourhood of Sobieszów. On 6 May 2015, the city, together with 18 surrounding municipalities, signed an agreement establishing the Jelenia Góra Agglomeration, with a population of 252,300 inhabitants. Currently, the Jelenia Góra Agglomeration (AJ) consists of the city of Jelenia Góra (a city with county rights) and 25 municipalities of urban, urban-rural, and rural character.

== Names ==
The city was mentioned by various names in historical sources:

- The Polish name Jelenia Góra together with Hyrszberg is mentioned in the book Krótki rys jeografii Szląska dla nauki początkowej published in Głogówek in 1847 by writer Józef Lompa. The 19th-century Geographical Dictionary of the Kingdom of Poland mentioned the city as Jeleniagóra. The Polish name Jelenia Góra was made official when the city became part of Poland again after World War II ended in 1945.
- In German, the city was mentioned as Hyrzberc (1281), Hyrspergk (1305), Hirssbergk (1355), and Hirsberg (1521), before eventually becoming the modern-day Hirschberg. In 1927–1945, the city was known as Hirschberg im Riesengebirge.
- In Czech, the city is known as Jelení Hora. Its historic Czech name, which was derived from the German name, was Hiršperk.
- In the sixteenth and seventeenth centuries, Latin names appear in different records, e.g. Mons Cervi, Cervimontia, Monscervinus, Cervigera.

== History ==
Human settlement in the area dates back to prehistoric times, and cemeteries of the Lusatian culture were discovered within the city limits during archaeological excavations.

=== Middle Ages ===
Archaeological evidence attests to prehistoric activity in the area, including cemeteries of the Lusatian culture found within today’s city boundaries. In the Early Middle Ages the region was settled by West Slavic tribes, specifically the Bobrzanie, one of the old Polish tribes. In the 7th century it was possibly part of the short-lived Samo's Empire, and incorporated into the Duchy of Poland under Mieszko I around 990. A modest fortified hillfort (gród) of probable Piast-period origin existed on the hill known until 1945 as Hausberg (renamed Wzgórze Krzywoustego / Bolesław Wrymouth Hill only after 1945) during the 10th–12th centuries, which lies west of the area where the medieval town was later established.

Later Polish tradition attributes the founding of a settlement to Duke Bolesław III Wrymouth in 1108 and its use as a base for his 1110 campaign against Bohemia, as well as a fortification expansion by Duke Bolesław II the Horned in 1242; these claims lack contemporary documentation and are regarded as legendary. The Jelenia Gora Valley remained thinly populated and heavily forested, with no signs of continuous settlement or urban development until the high medieval period.

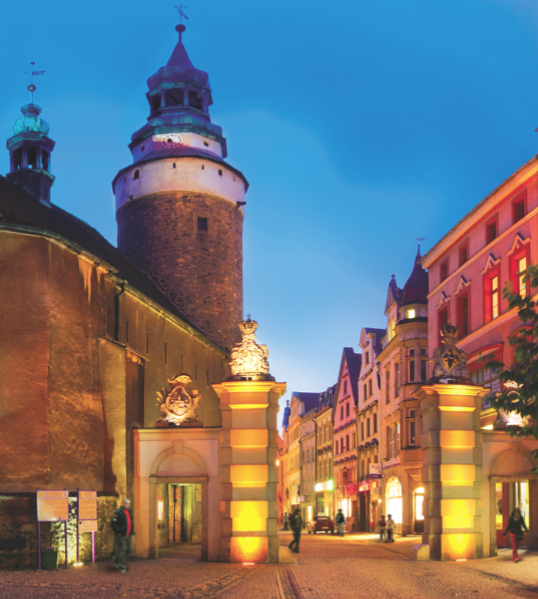
St. Anne Chapel and Wojanowska Gate, part of the medieval defense complex

The documented history of the place begins only in 1281, when it is first reliably mentioned in written records under its German name Hyrzberc as part of the German eastward colonization (Ostsiedlung). From this Middle High German form the name Hirschberg evolved and remained the official designation until 1945. In 1288 Duke Bolko I the Strict granted city rights, laying the foundation for the planned urban settlement that developed into the medieval town.

The city flourished in the 14th century, and became a center of crafts and trade. Weaving developed, and the citizens were exempt from tolls in trade with Wrocław and Bohemia. In 1317, the Corpus Christi Hospital was first mentioned in documents, although it possibly was founded in the 13th century. In 1345 a city council was established. In 1348 an earthquake struck the city, and Duke Bolko II the Small granted it new privileges. In 1361 the city was allowed to build a winery, market stalls and was given the privilege of minting its own gold and silver coins. When the Silesian Piasts lost inheritance and Agnes of Habsburg, the last duchess of Świdnica-Jawor died in 1392, the city passed to Bohemia, ruled by the House of Luxembourg. In 1426 and 1427 the city was invaded by the Hussites.

=== Modern era ===
In 1502 King Vladislaus II issued a privilege extending the city's autonomy and in 1519 King Louis II granted the right to an annual fair.

The town was inherited by Habsburg Austria in 1526, two years after the town adopted the Protestant faith. In 1533, all old privileges of the city were confirmed. In 1539, a second annual fair was established. In 1540 the municipal school suffered a fire. In 1548, the city refused to support Charles V in the religious Schmalkaldic War, for which he fined the city and deposed the mayor. A Protestant school was built in 1566. In 1560 a fire destroyed large parts of the city and stopped the economic development, which until then had been characterized by linen-weaving. The city recovered when Joachim Girnth, a shoemaker on a return journey from Holland, introduced veil-weaving. The first "light veils" were offered in 1625, and five years later the city received an imperial privilege by Ferdinand II for these veils.

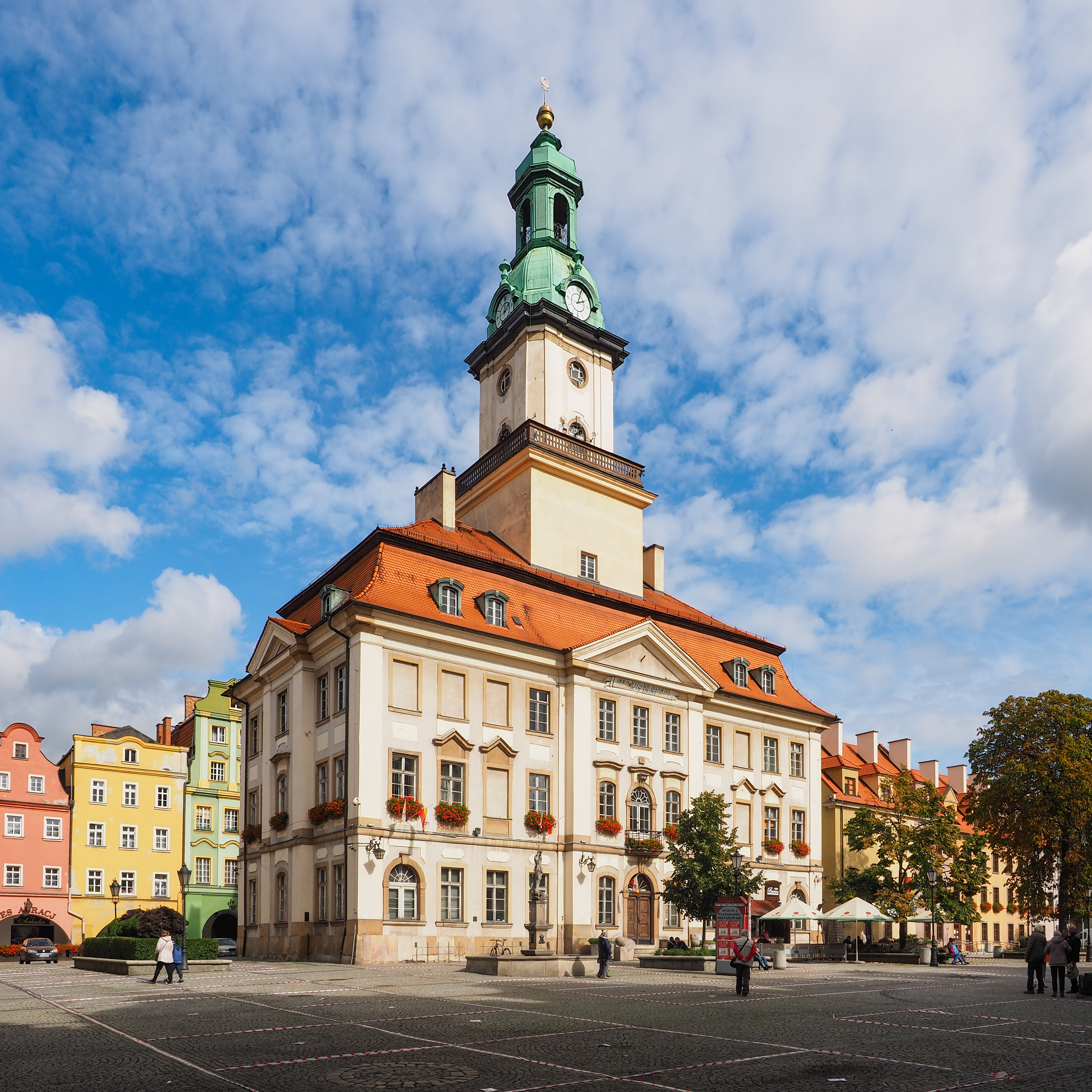
Town hall, built between 1744 and 1749, is located on the main square

During the Thirty Years' War the city suffered badly. It was beleaguered by troops of both parties, paid high contributions, and during a siege in 1634 the city burned down again. Two more sieges followed in 1640 and 1641. The town needed several years to recover. One reason for the new boost was the creation of a merchant society in 1658, which secured the city's position as the most important center of linen and veil trade in the Silesian mountains during the 17th and 18th centuries.

The Protestants of the city were oppressed during the Counter-Reformation, but the second Treaty of Altranstädt, which allowed a Protestant community center and church to be established outside the medieval city walls, brought relief. Great sacrifices by the merchant society, especially its most prominent member Christian Menzel, made the construction of a large church, modelled after Church of Catherine in Stockholm, possible. The cemetery of the church was the preferred burial place for most merchant families.

Hirschberg was annexed with Lower Silesia by the Kingdom of Prussia during the Silesian Wars. The city was again partly destroyed, had to pay contributions and was seized several times. The detachment from Austria and the new border in the mountains to the south badly damaged the economy as the merchants lost a large part of their customers. Although Prussia took on substantial efforts to revive the economy, they never recovered completely and finally lost their position during the Industrial Revolution.

In 1800, John Quincy Adams, ambassador in Berlin at that time and future President of the United States, visited Hirschberg and said: "Nothing can be more beautiful than the location of Hirschberg, a beautifully built city with numerous splendid buildings, in a valley surrounded by hills on all sides, with the magnificent view of the Giant Mountains".

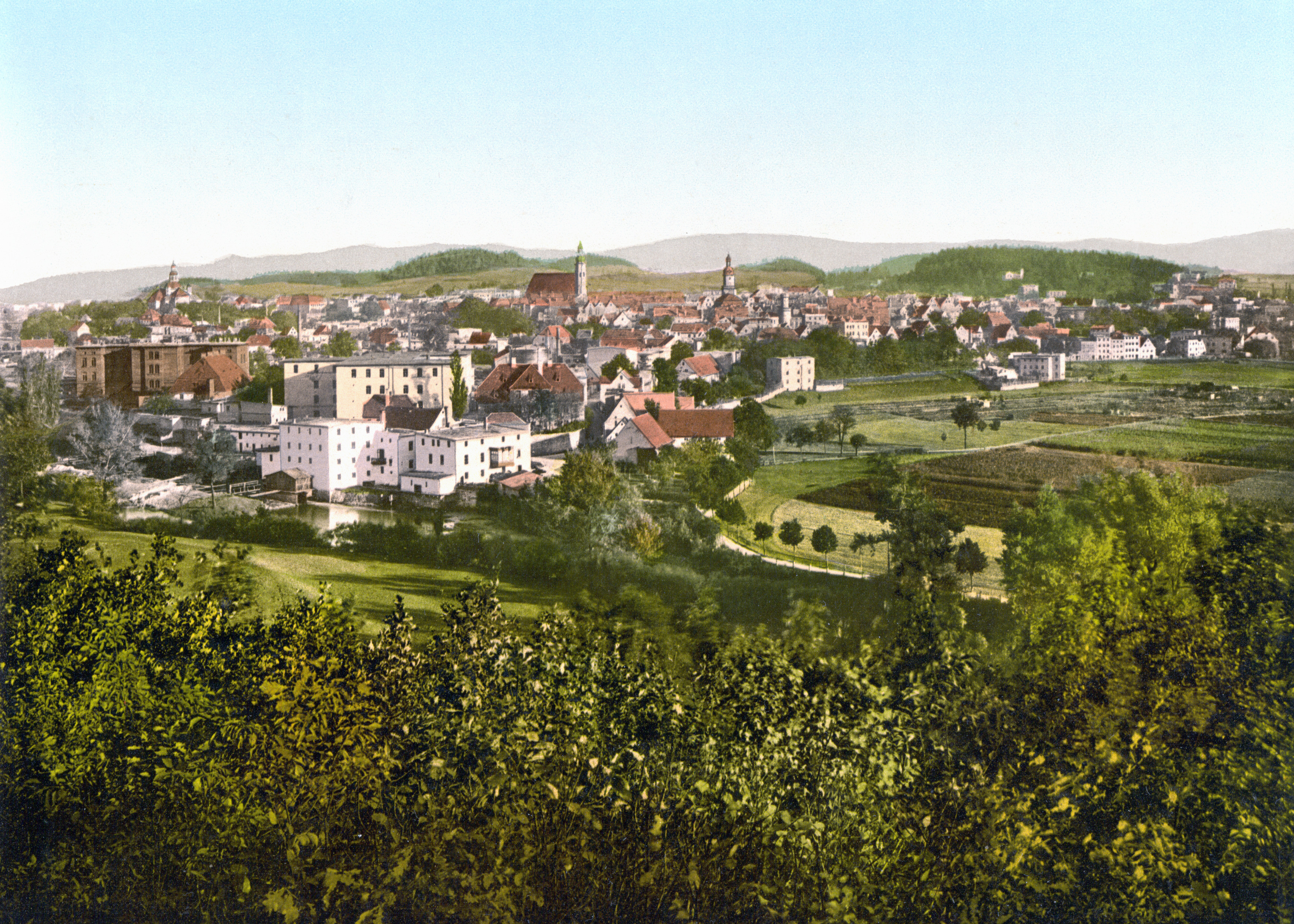
Panorama from c. 1900

In 1871 the town became part of the German Empire with the Prussian-led unification of Germany, as one of the largest towns in the Province of Silesia. In 1882, a railway connecting the city with Kowary was opened, and in 1905 it was further expanded to Kamienna Góra. In 1891, a railway connecting the city with Piechowice was opened, and in 1902 it was further expanded to Szklarska Poręba and Harrachov. In 1889 the Deutsche Riesengebirgsverein (German Giant Mountains Club), an organization to protect the environment of the Giant Mountains and to promote tourism, was founded by Theodor Donat and 47 other dignitaries of the region.

=== 20th century ===
Memorial to victims of the subcamps of the Gross-Rosen concentration camp

After World War I, the town became part of the Prussian Province of Lower Silesia in 1919, and in 1922 became a separate city. On September 1, 1939, the day of the German invasion of Poland and the outbreak of World War II, Luftwaffe used the airport in Hirschberg to conduct air raids on Poland. In April 1940, the first transport of 2,000 Poles deported from Sosnowiec, Będzin and Olkusz for forced labor arrived to the city. In the city, the Germans organized 19 labor camps in which they imprisoned mainly Poles, Czechs, Frenchmen and Belgians, but also Luxembourgers, Russians, Ukrainians, Greeks, and Estonians, including women. They also established four prisoner-of-war camps: two for French, one for Jews from different countries and one for Soviets. French POWs organized a secret resistance movement and cooperated with Poles from other camps. There were also two subcamps of the Gross-Rosen concentration camp, whose prisoners were mostly Poles and Jews from various German-occupied countries, chiefly Poland, the Netherlands, Belgium and Hungary. In 1943 and 1944 there was a significant influx of Germans from the bombed German cities, and in 1944, after the crushing of the Warsaw Uprising, Poles deported from Warsaw were temporarily imprisoned there.

When the Red Army captured the city on 8 May 1945, as a result of the influx of people in the last years of the war, there were 160,000 people in the city. On 19 May, the first representatives of a Polish operational group arrived and set about establishing a Polish administration. At this point, the bulk of the pre-war German population was still in place. A first wave of expulsions of Germans began in June 1945, accompanied by a simultaneous mass influx of Polish settlers, whom the Polish State Repatriation Office (Państwowy Urząd Repatriacyjny) transported to the city by freight train. To make room for the newcomers, part of the German population was driven from their homes and confined to a single district of the city, where they were forced to live under ghetto-like conditions. Some Germans were arrested and detained in a Polish Citizens' Militia prison, where they were subjected to mistreatment, in a number of cases with fatal consequences.

According to the decisions of the Potsdam Conference, the city was annexed by Poland. It became officially known by its Polish name of Jelenia Góra, which was first recorded in 1847. The German population declined further, dropping from 35,000 in October 1945 to 19,589 in January 1946. The majority of those who remained were subsequently expelled through mass transports by freight train to the British occupation zone, carried out in three phases: May to June 1946, November 1946 to January 1947, and April to October 1947. Those deported during the winter months were exposed to extreme cold, and a number froze to death on the journey. When the third phase concluded, 302 Germans remained in the city – virtually the entire pre-war population had been expelled.

In the 1950s also Greeks, refugees of the Greek Civil War, settled in Jelenia Góra.

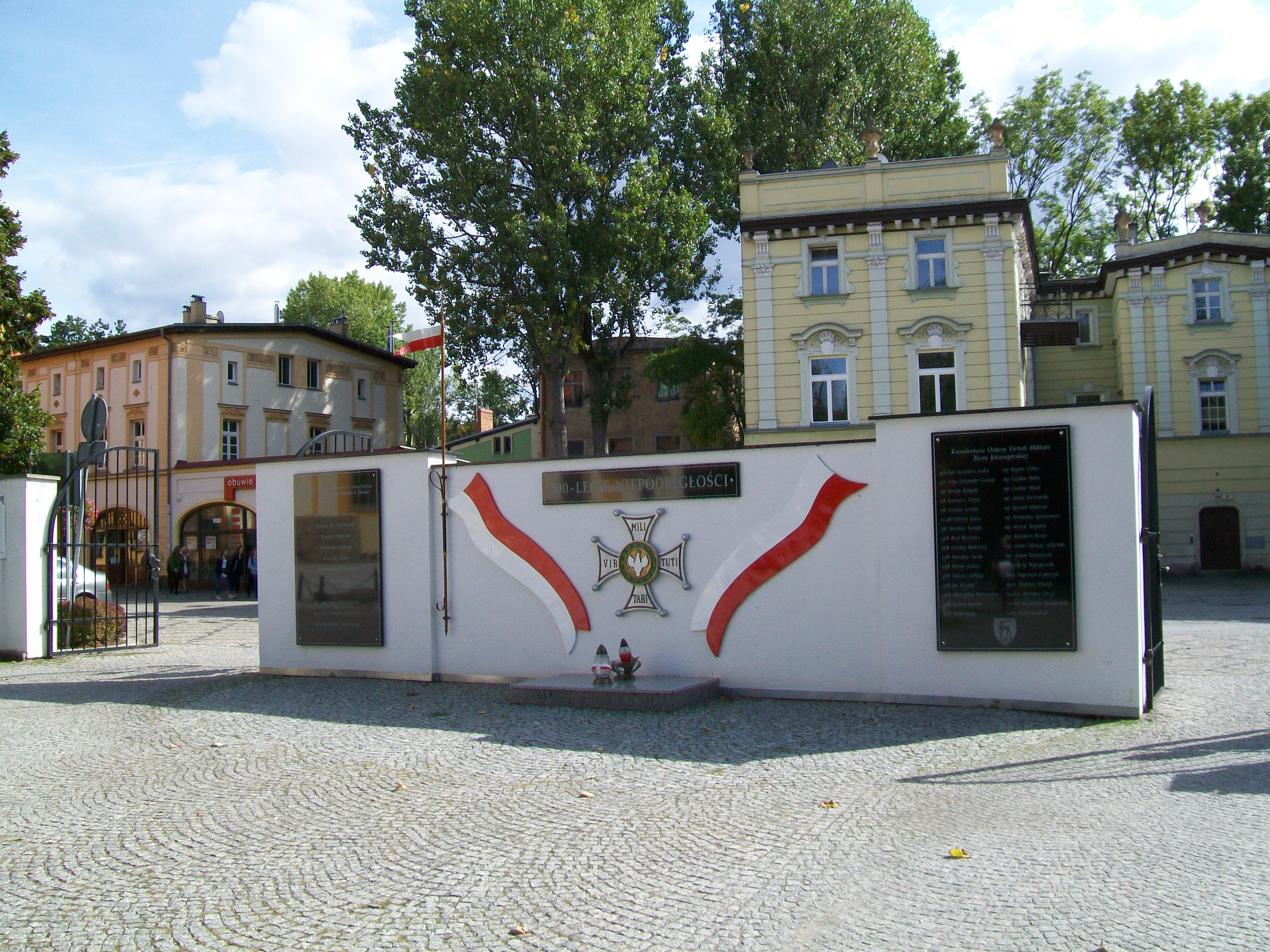
Polish Independence Monument

A local unit of the Freedom and Independence Association was formed in 1945 by former Home Army partisans. From October 1945, the Polish underground newspaper Wolność ("Freedom") was issued and distributed in Jelenia Góra. In mid-1946, the communists carried out arrests of local resistance leaders, however, some managed to escape arrest.

In 1945, Jelenia Góra became the seat of the Polish Dolnośląskie Towarzystwo Turystyczno-Krajoznawcze ("Lower Silesian Tourist and Sightseeing Society") founded in nearby Przesieka, and after its merger with the Polish Tourist and Sightseeing Society it remained a seat of its branch, which runs a number of mountain huts in the nearby Giant Mountains.

The city was not destroyed in the war, but the state of its buildings and infrastructure declined over the next decade. The communist authorities dismantled the neglected tenements around the Old Town until 1965 and destroyed the cemetery of the former German Protestant church. Since then the buildings around the market place have been reconstructed in simpler 18th-century historical forms.

From 1975 to 1998, it was the capital of the Jelenia Góra Voivodeship. In 1976, the city was enlarged through the incorporation of Sobieszów, Maciejowa and the spa town of Cieplice Śląskie-Zdrój.

In January 1981, a general strike took place in Jelenia Góra, joining the nationwide Solidarity strikes.

== Politics ==
Members of Parliament (Sejm) elected from Jelenia Gora-Legnica constituency in Polish parliamentary election 2011 included: Grzegorz Schetyna PO, Ewa Drozd PO, Norbert Wojnerowski PO, Zofia Czernow PO, Robert Kropiwnicki PO, Adam Lipiński PIS, Elżbieta Witek PIS, Marzena Machałek PIS, Wojciech Zubowski PIS, Ryszard Zbrzyzny SLD, Małgorzata Sekuła-Szmajdzińska SLD, Henryk Kmiecik RP.

== Geography ==
The city is located in the northern part of the Jelenia Góra Valley. From the west, the city is surrounded by mountains and foothills of Izera Mountains, north Kaczawskie Mountains, east Rudawy Janowickie Mountains and in the south Karkonosze Mountains. The center is located about 1 km (0.6 mi) east from the place where the two rivers Bóbr (Beaver River) and Kamienna (Stone River) connects.

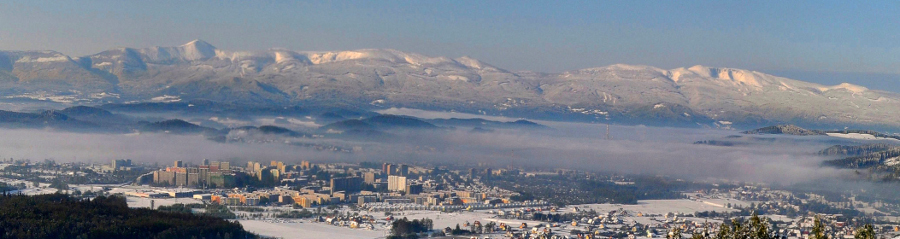
Jelenia Gora Panorama, view from Mount Szybowcowa (Glider Mountain)

=== Climate ===
Jelenia Góra has an oceanic climate (Köppen climate classification: Cfb) using the −3 °C (27 °F) isotherm or a humid continental climate (Köppen climate classification: Dfb) using the 0 °C (32 °F) isotherm.

Climate data for Jelenia Góra (1991–2020 normals, extremes 1951–present)
Month	Jan	Feb	Mar	Apr	May	Jun	Jul	Aug	Sep	Oct	Nov	Dec	Year
Record high °C (°F)	17.6 (63.7)	21.2 (70.2)	24.4 (75.9)	28.8 (83.8)	31.1 (88.0)	36.0 (96.8)	35.4 (95.7)	35.8 (96.4)	34.0 (93.2)	27.7 (81.9)	19.9 (67.8)	16.3 (61.3)	36.0 (96.8)
Mean daily maximum °C (°F)	2.8 (37.0)	4.2 (39.6)	8.1 (46.6)	14.0 (57.2)	18.4 (65.1)	21.7 (71.1)	23.8 (74.8)	23.7 (74.7)	18.6 (65.5)	13.6 (56.5)	7.9 (46.2)	3.7 (38.7)	13.4 (56.1)
Daily mean °C (°F)	−1.3 (29.7)	−0.2 (31.6)	2.9 (37.2)	7.9 (46.2)	12.4 (54.3)	15.7 (60.3)	17.6 (63.7)	17.1 (62.8)	12.6 (54.7)	8.3 (46.9)	3.6 (38.5)	−0.2 (31.6)	8.0 (46.4)
Mean daily minimum °C (°F)	−5.5 (22.1)	−4.5 (23.9)	−1.9 (28.6)	1.6 (34.9)	6.1 (43.0)	9.6 (49.3)	11.4 (52.5)	10.8 (51.4)	7.2 (45.0)	3.4 (38.1)	−0.6 (30.9)	−4.2 (24.4)	2.8 (37.0)
Record low °C (°F)	−31.8 (−25.2)	−36.9 (−34.4)	−29.6 (−21.3)	−14.5 (5.9)	−5.5 (22.1)	−2.1 (28.2)	1.8 (35.2)	0.3 (32.5)	−5.6 (21.9)	−8.7 (16.3)	−22.1 (−7.8)	−29.5 (−21.1)	−36.9 (−34.4)
Average precipitation mm (inches)	39.8 (1.57)	34.6 (1.36)	48.1 (1.89)	41.5 (1.63)	72.2 (2.84)	84.0 (3.31)	110.2 (4.34)	88.4 (3.48)	64.6 (2.54)	47.6 (1.87)	38.8 (1.53)	36.8 (1.45)	706.5 (27.81)
Average extreme snow depth cm (inches)	9.7 (3.8)	8.6 (3.4)	6.9 (2.7)	2.3 (0.9)	0.3 (0.1)	0.0 (0.0)	0.0 (0.0)	0.0 (0.0)	0.0 (0.0)	0.7 (0.3)	3.3 (1.3)	5.9 (2.3)	9.7 (3.8)
Average precipitation days (≥ 0.1 mm)	17.10	15.43	16.73	12.63	15.00	16.07	15.43	14.43	14.90	15.30	15.67	16.47	185.16
Average snowy days (≥ 0 cm)	17.3	14.0	8.3	1.7	0.0	0.0	0.0	0.0	0.0	0.4	5.0	12.8	59.5
Average relative humidity (%)	82.6	79.5	76.8	71.9	73.6	75.0	75.1	76.9	81.1	82.2	84.8	84.2	78.6
Mean monthly sunshine hours	68.9	87.4	128.4	185.9	221.0	218.9	234.4	229.7	155.3	124.8	76.9	65.7	1,797.1
Source 1: Institute of Meteorology and Water Management
Source 2: Meteomodel.pl (records, relative humidity 1991–2020)

== Population ==
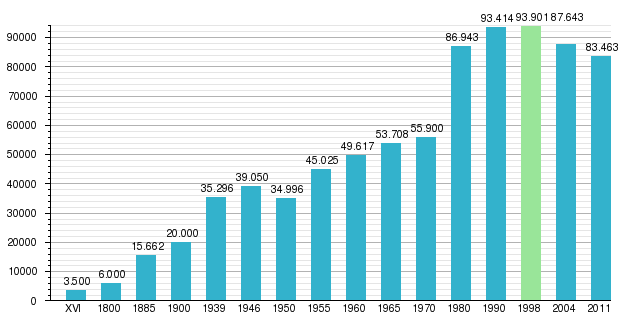
Population of Jelenia Góra.

The first written records from the mid-sixteenth century mention a population of approximately 3.5 thousand residents. In the late eighteenth and early nineteenth century, the population was about 6,000 people, to rise up to about 20,000 in the early twentieth century. The population in 1939 increased to over 35,000. During World War II, the city's population skyrocketed, reaching 140,000, as Germany brought thousands of forced labourers and prisoners of war of various nationalities and due to an influx of refugees from German cities fleeing from Allied bombings. After the war, the city had a population of 39,000 residents, including more than 35,000 Germans. During the period 1945–1947, the German population was mostly expelled from Jelenia Góra in accordance with the Potsdam Agreement. After the creation of Jelenia Góra Voivodeship in 1975 and connection to the city surrounding towns, including Cieplice Śląskie-Zdrój, Population increased to 80 thousand. In subsequent years, the city's population grew, but mainly as a result of joining other nearby villages. The population rose to 93,570 inhabitants by 1996, but after the administrative reform in 1998 and the establishment of Lower Silesia voivodeship, the population of Jelenia Gora is steadily decreasing. By December 2004 it was only 87,643, and by June 2010 it had fallen to 84,306 people. As of 2022, the city's population is 75,794.

1. Poles (98.1%): 98.1%
2. Germans (0.40%): 0.40%
3. Ukrainians (0.23%): 0.23%
4. English people (0.14%): 0.14%
5. Other Identifications (1.13%): 1.13%

== Transmitter ==
In 1957, a broadcasting station for mediumwave radio was inaugurated in Jelenia Góra at ul. Sudecka 55. Until 1967, it used a 47-metre-tall wooden tower, which may have been the only wooden radio tower built in Poland after 1945. In 1967 it was replaced by a 72-metre-tall steel mast. Since the shutdown of the medium wave transmitter in 1994, this mast has been used for FM broadcasting.

== Culture ==
Jelenia Góra has a wide range of cultural institutions, including theaters, a concert hall, and cinema and art exhibitions offices. Festivals such as the International Film Festival "Zoom Zbliżenia", International Street Theatre Festival, and the International Festival of Organ Music "Silesia Sonans" take place.

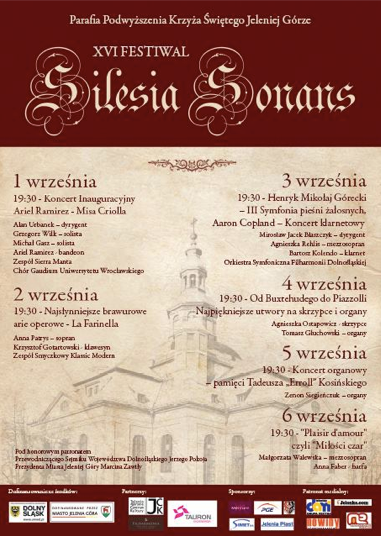
Silesia Sonans poster from 2013

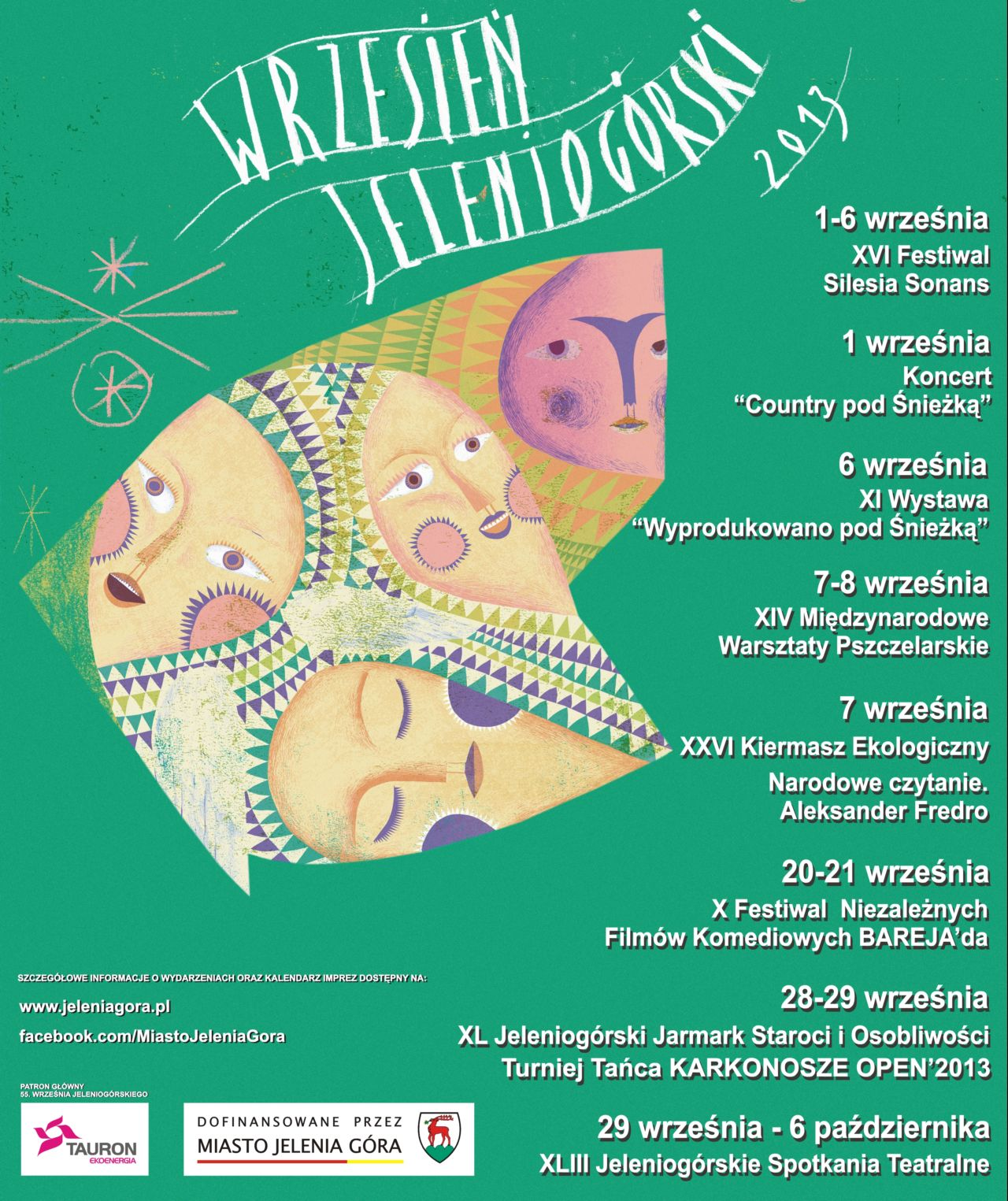
55 Wrzesień Jeleniogórski, poster from 2013

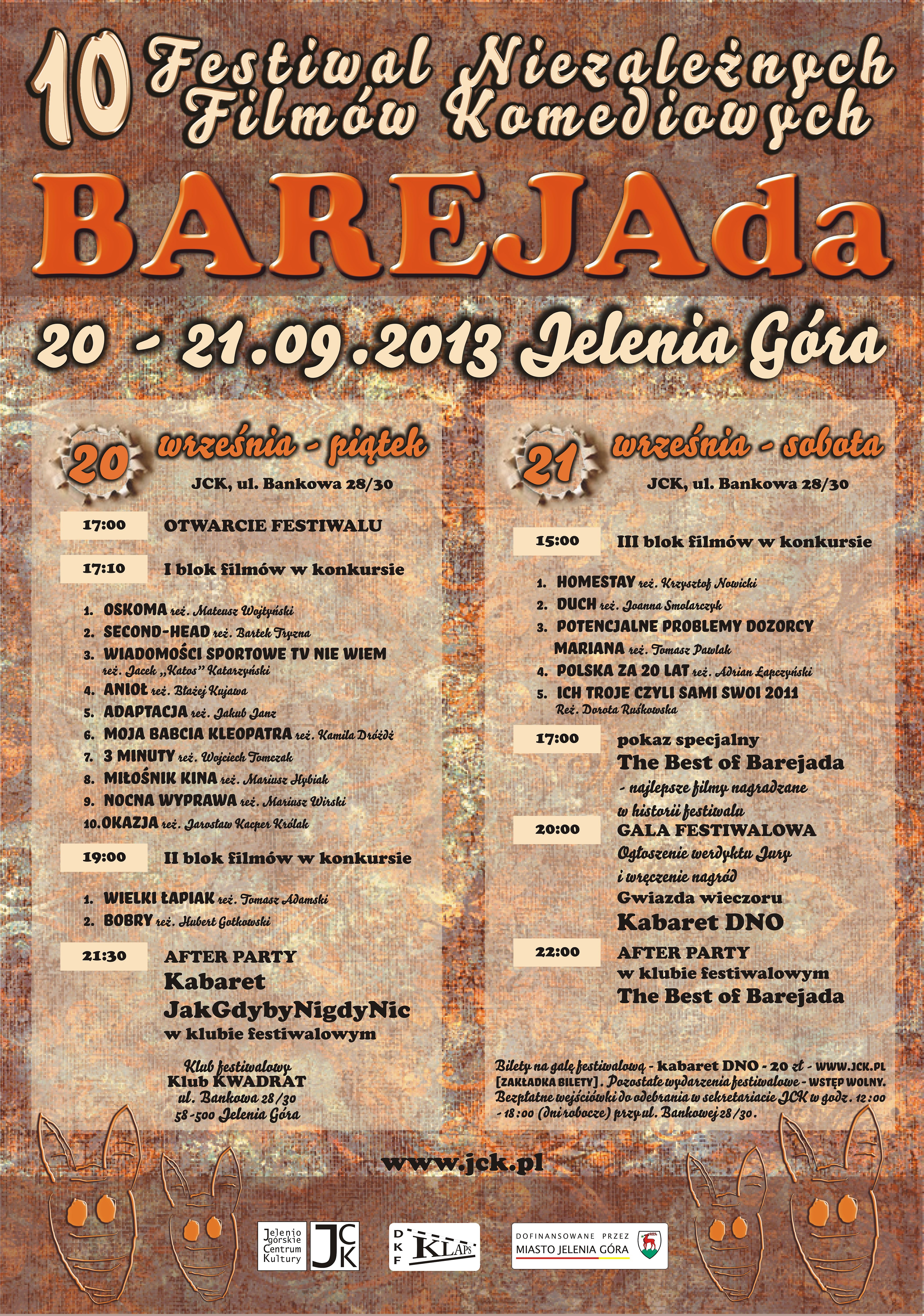
Poster- Barejada 2013

The "Silesia Sonans" European Organ Music Festival takes place annually in autumn. Other cultural and entertainment events include concerts, art shows, exhibitions, fairs, and events geared for children and families. The"Silesia Sonans" Festival is particularly noteworthy. Outstanding Polish and foreign artists gather to play pieces of famous composers inside the Garrison Church.

- The Cyprian Norwid Theatre first opened as early as in 1904, with performance staged ceremoniously. The building was designed in the Art Nouveau style with features typical for 19th-century theatre edifices. Theatre remains active to this day with new performances staged regularly. The same building features a restaurant "OldPub" with live music.
- Open Air Museum of the Polish Army Armament – the largest open-air museum of this type in Lower Silesia. It is located on a former military unit. Since 2005 Łomnica has an open-air exhibition, which presents the radar equipment from entire Poland.
- Lower Silesian Philharmonic in Jelenia Góra (pl) is the concert hall of the Lower Silesian Philharmonic hosts many famous artists and the Jelenia Góra symphonists give concerts in Poland and abroad, participate in international festivals accompanying known persons from the art world and also support young talents. Concerts for the local audience, regional projects and educational activity are another vital part of the Philharmonic's undertakings.
- Zdrojowy Animation Theatre was built between 1833 and 1836 in the neoclassical style, it can accommodate up to 270 spectators. Founded by Schaffgotsch family, one of the three puppet theaters in Lower Silesia. Currently scene belongs to the Zdrojowy Animation Theater in the Zdrojowy Park which aside from its primary activity also organizes the cultural life of Cieplice.
- Natural History Museum is located in the Norweski Park in Cieplice. It was built in 1909 on the basis of a draft Frognersteren restaurant situated just below Oslo. Collections are mainly based on the now-defunct Schaffgotsch collection. It includes Poland's largest exhibition of birds.
- Jelenia Góra Cultural Center works with many events in the city (League of Rock, charity event WOŚP, September Jeleniogórski, Krokus Jazz Festival, Comedy Film Festival "Barejada", International conference on new educational techniques) also runs a number of workshops.
- Karkonosze Museum – The museum collects exhibits related to the history, ethnography, crafts and regional art. Particularly interesting exhibits include the largest artistic glass collection in Poland, ample 18th- and 19th-century glass painting collections, collections of tinwork and an ethnographic exposition – a Lusatian-built wooden cottage equipped with traditional equipment used in the 18th and 19th centuries.
- Karkonosze Light Festival – During the Light Festival the city gains a special kind of charm owing to colorful, professionally designed illuminations. The aim of the project is to present the most modern technologies and products used to illuminate cities, while maintaining care for the environment.
- ZOOM – ZBLIŻENIA International Film Festival is a festival promoting independent films. The format of the competition is open, anyone willing can challenge the silver screen with their piece.
- Antique and curio fair for a few days in September revives Jelenia Góra commercial roots. The local fair is one of the largest in Poland, it is attended by collectors from all of Europe. At the fair, you can buy old furniture and practical items, numismatic collections, books, trinkets and plenty of other things.
- International street theatre Festival – In August the Jelenia Góra Town Square for a brief period transforms into a stage for incoming artistic groups. Actors are not confined by the closed space of theatre building and the unique scenery and the scale of the plays provide unforgettable thrills.
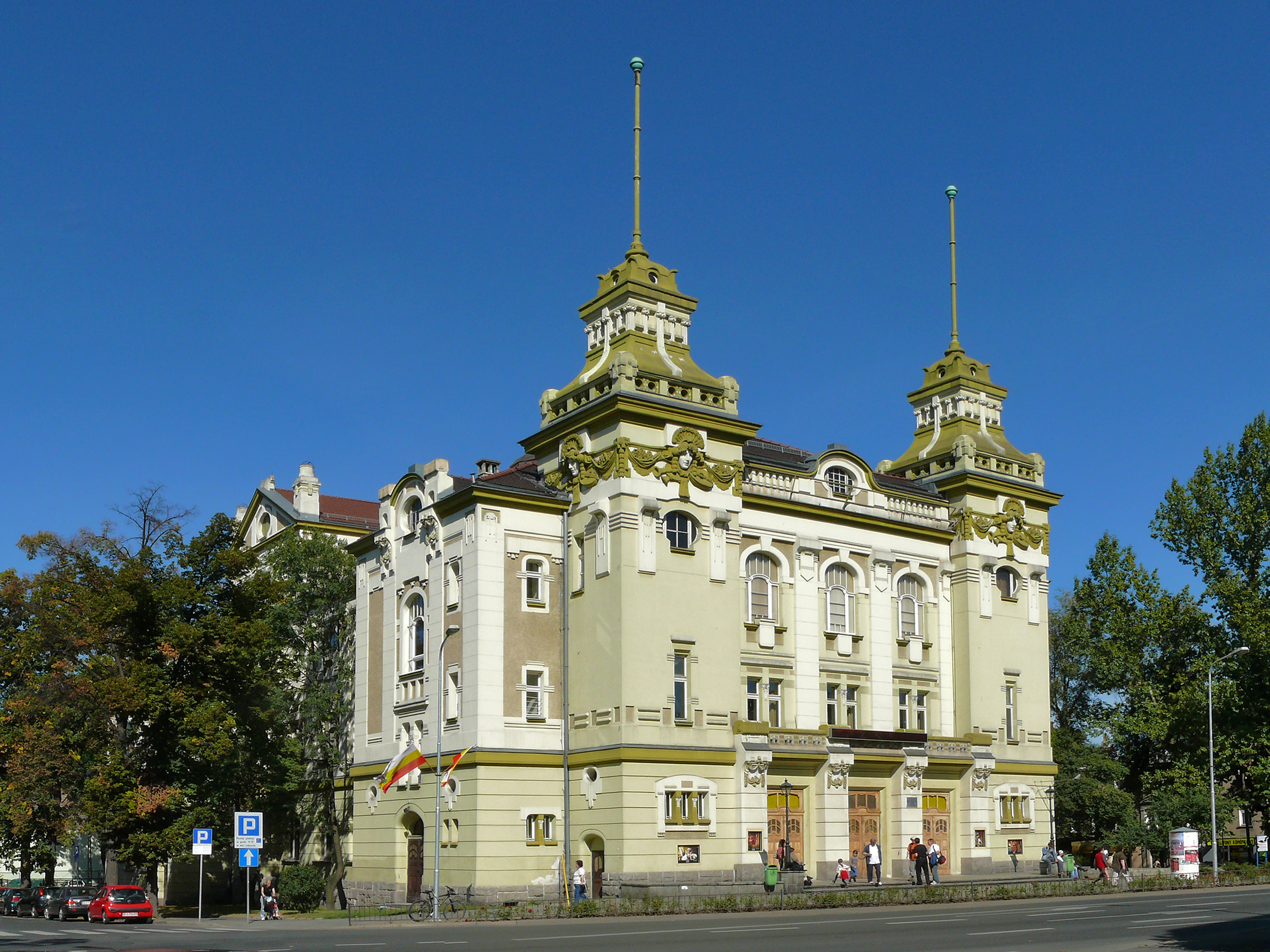
Cyprian Norwid Theatre

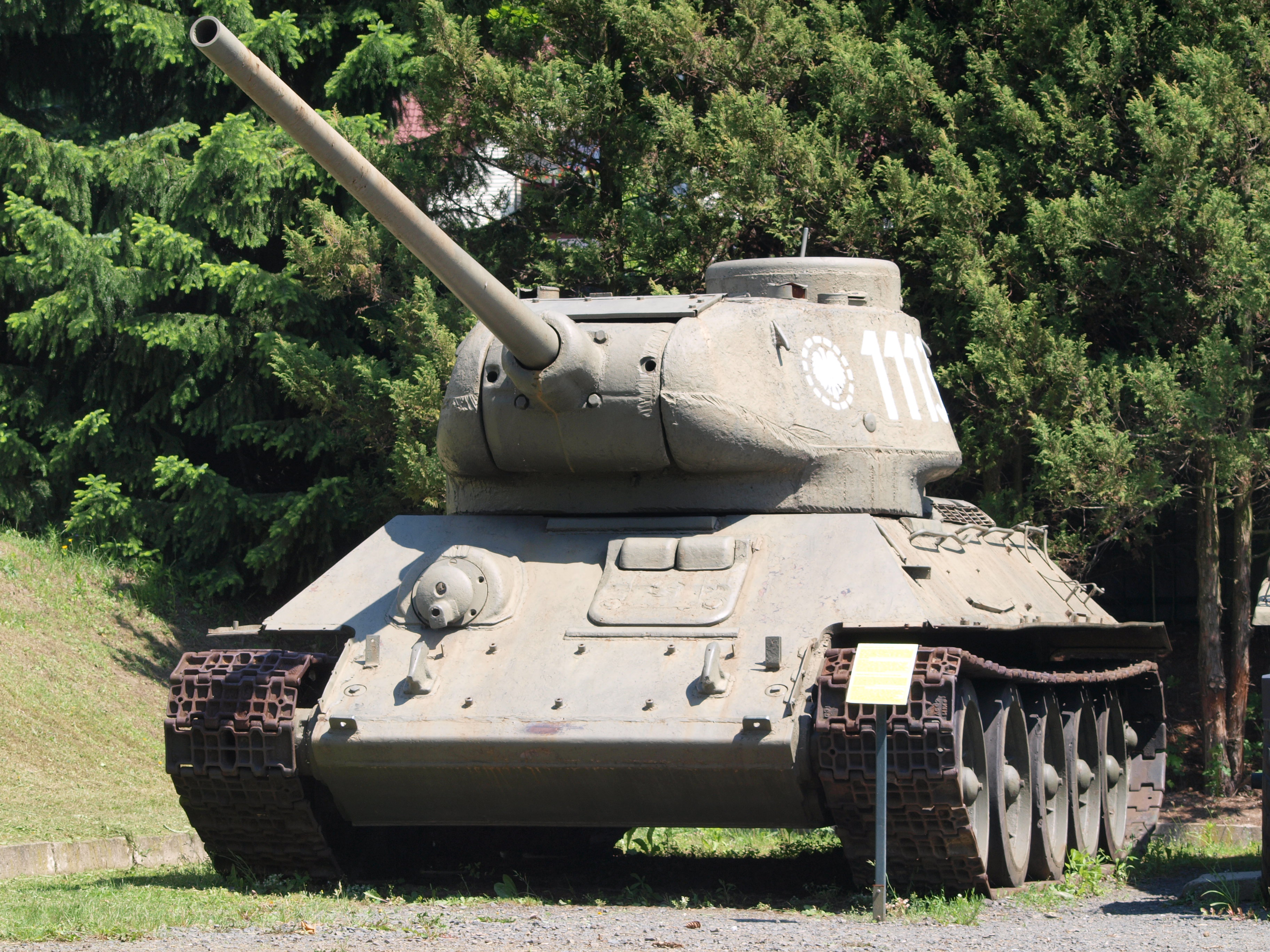
T-34 Tank at the Open Air Exhibit of the Armament of the Polish Armed Forces

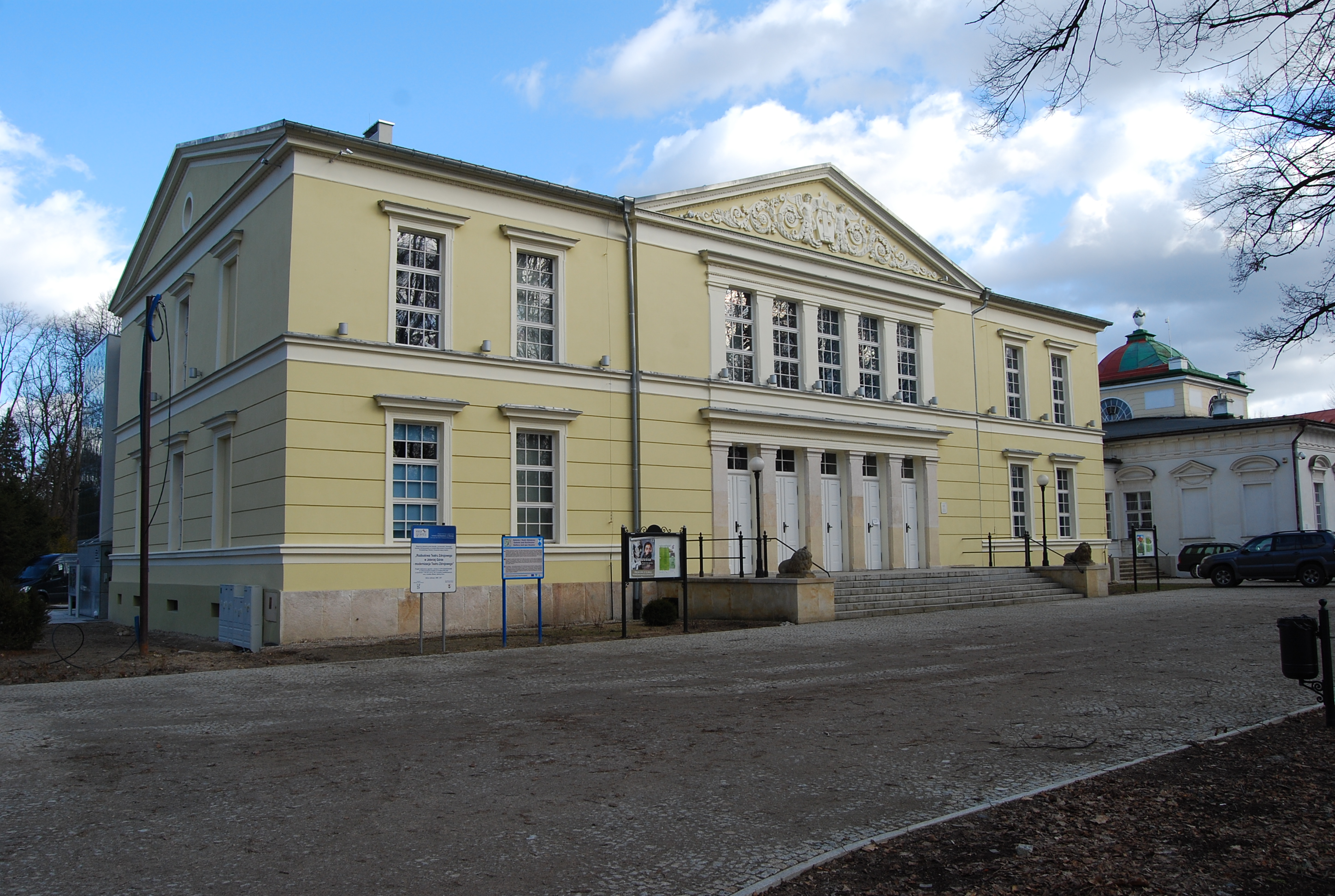
Zdrojowy Animation Theatre

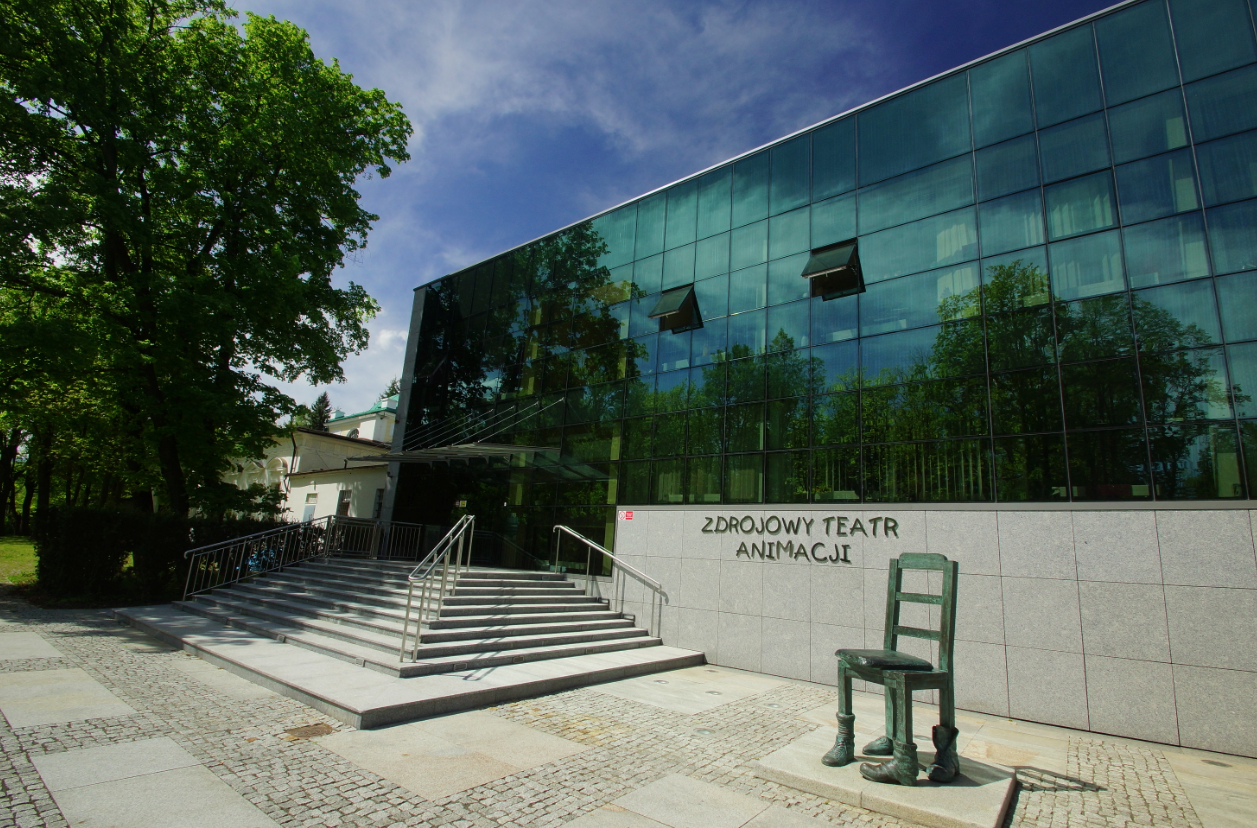
Zdrojowy Animation Theatre - Back Entrance

== Education ==
The city is the educational hub for Jelenia Góra County and even further regions. Along with many primary and secondary schools, there are three higher education institutions in Jelenia góra:

- Karkonosze University of Applied Sciences
- Wrocław University of Economics (faculty in Jelenia Góra),
- Wrocław University of Science and Technology (faculty in Jelenia Góra).

== Landmarks ==
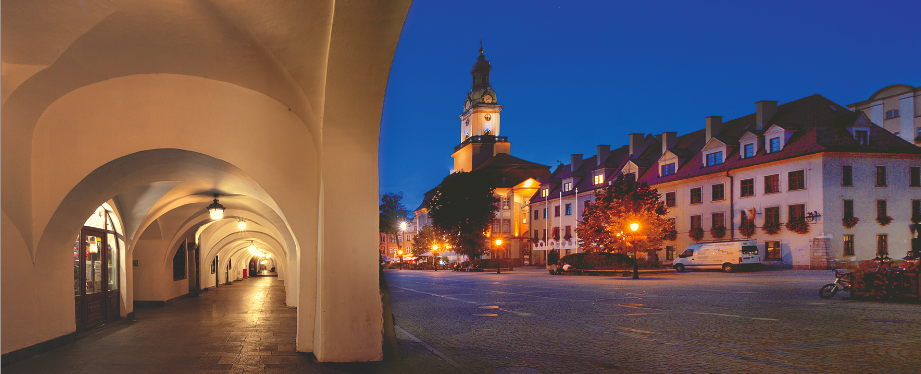
A view of the historic arcades with Jelenia Góra Town Hall and "Seven Houses" in the distance

The Wojanowska gate and tower were part of the medieval defence complex that protected the road to Wojanów. Dungeons served as a prison. In 1480, the tower due to strong wind collapsed burying five people. Quickly it was rebuilt by adding the clock and the dome with a lantern, and this state has survived to this day. Coats of arms have been placed on the pillars: Prussian, Silesia, urban and inscription. In 1869, the gate was dismantled and moved to the barracks at Obrońców Pokoju street. After the renovation in 1998, returned to its former place. Located inside the medieval bastion was the St. Anne Chapel of the Wojanowska gate. In the portal above the entrance to the chapel there is an inscription: " „HonorI Magnae ChrIstI aVlae DIVae Annae ereCta”"(built for the glory of the great grandmother of Christ, St. Anna) with a hidden date of 1715.

The Basilica of St. Erasmus and St. Pancratius built in the 14th century features the chapel dedicated to the Patrons of Jelenia Gora; however, it got its present form in the next century. The church was built of stone in the form of a three-nave basilica topped with a tower. Even today, you can admire numerous Gothic stone details best preserved in portals and window frames. The southern portal is exceptionally rich and interesting. Two sepulchral chapels (from the 17th and 18th century) were built into the church's walls; over 20 epitaphs and tombstones from the 16th and 18th century were placed on the two chapels. The main entrance to the chapel is located on the west, on the ground floor. The interior is also Gothic, but the fittings come from Renaissance and Baroque. The incredibly rich and monumental altar from the 18th century dominates the interior. The temple also houses priceless organs from the same period made in the workshop of an Italian organ builder – Adam Casparini. The 16th-century pulpit and the intarsiated (made of different wood types) choir stalls are a little older. There are also two 18th-century figures on the church grounds – the Marian column is near the main entrance, and on the northern side, there is a sculpture of St. John of Nepomuk. It used to be located on one bridge over the Młynowka river; however, after it was damaged and then reconstructed in 1886, it was moved to its present place.

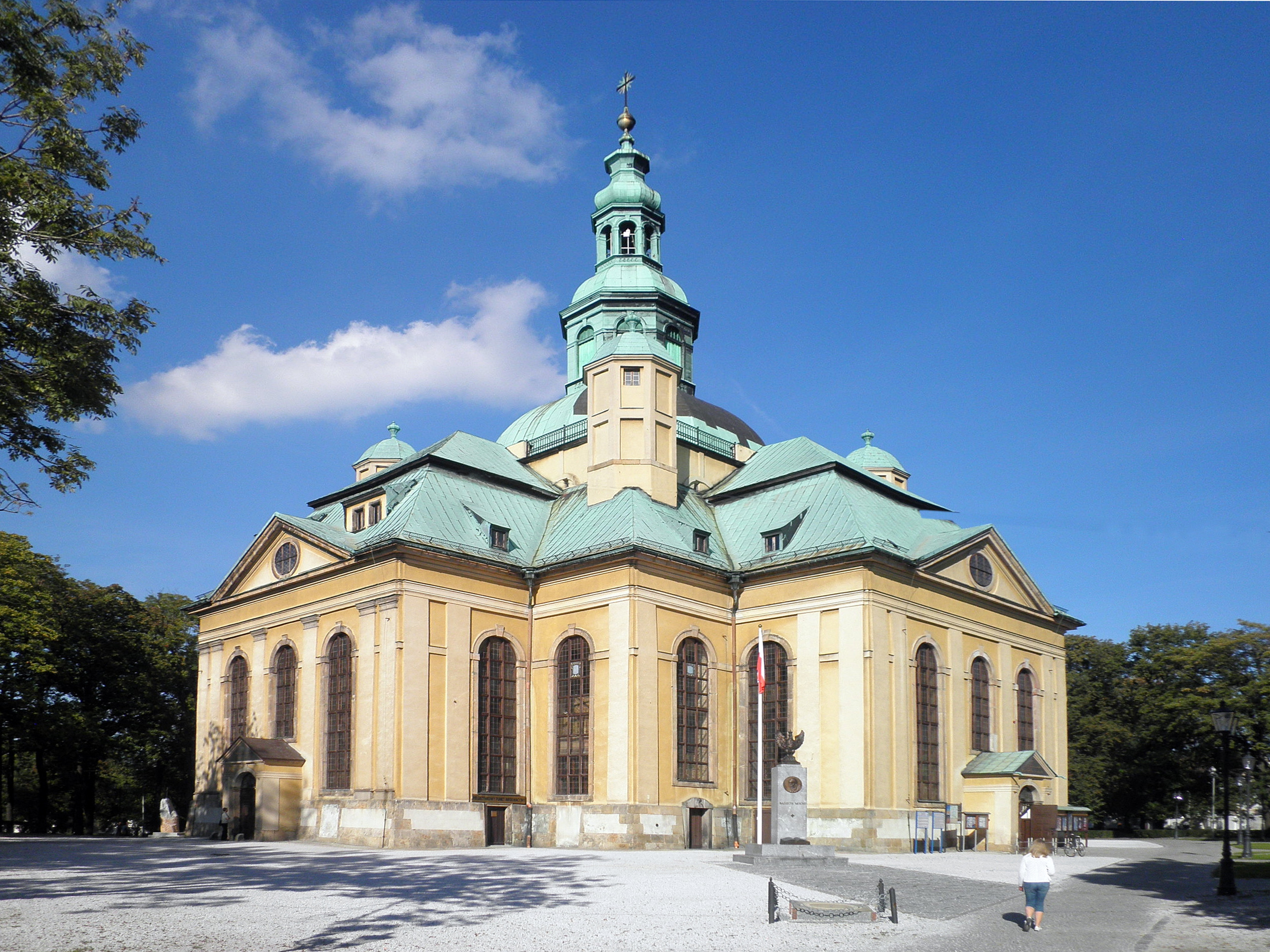
Exaltation of the Holy Cross Church

The Exaltation of the Holy Cross Church was erected as a proof of the grace of the Catholic Emperor of Austria for the Silesian evangelicals. Under the arrangement concluded in Altranstadt after a religious war they were granted the right to build six churches in Silesia which at that time was under Austrian rule. The design of the temple was prepared by the architect, Martin Frantz of Tallinn. The construction works lasted nine years (1709–1718) and the newly built church was deceptively similar to its prototype – St. Catherine's Church in Stockholm (the work of the same designer). The structure was erected on the plan of a cross and topped with a dome. The interior was equipped with a three-storey matronea which can accommodate more than two thousand members of the congregation. The railings were adorned with citations and paintings displaying scenes from the Old and New Testament. The altar together with the organ front placed over it make up an extended, beautifully adorned architectural form.

The town hall is the central point of the market square. The building was erected between 1744 and 1749. The entire square is surrounded by Baroque tenement houses with arcades, which originally used to serve the merchants to sell their goods. At the beginning of the 20th century, the tenement houses near the City Hall were bought and adjoined to the town hall (the so-called "Seven-Houses"). Right next to the town hall there is a fountain with a sculpture of Neptune – god of the seas. The sculpture is to commemorate old trade relations with overseas lands.

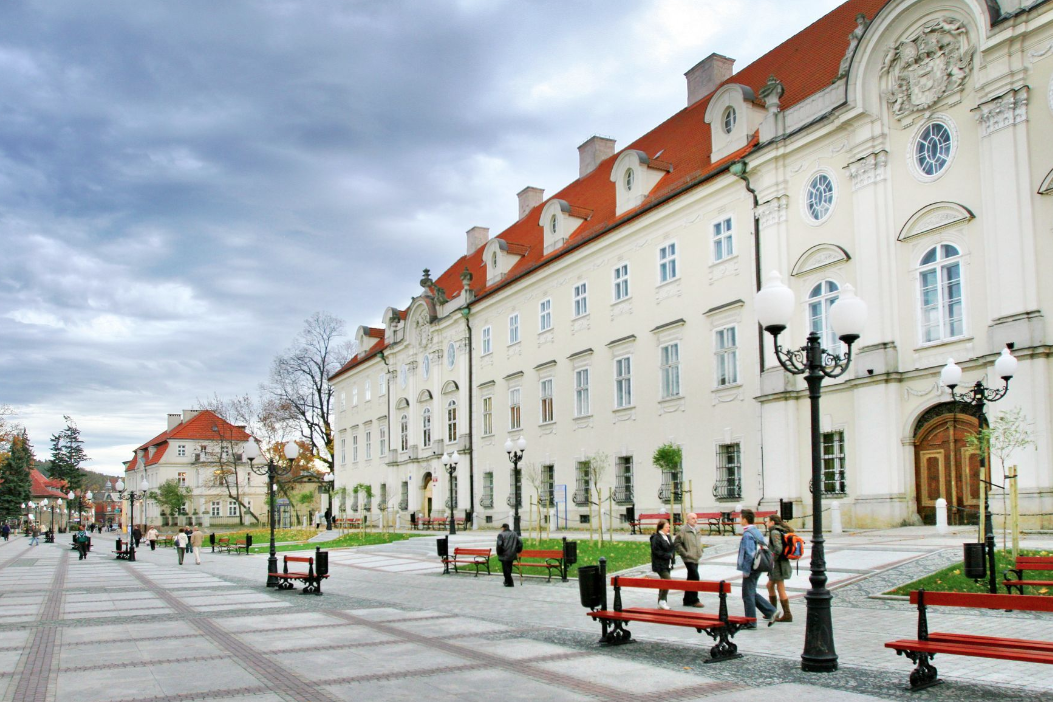
Schaffgotsch Palace – Cieplice

The Schaffgotsch family ruling vast lands around Karkonosze settled in Cieplice in 1675. Their previous seat was Chojnik Castle, burned down due to lightning strike. Their Schaffgotsch Palace's greatest ornament are the two semi-circular finished porticos with richly ornamented cartouches carrying the family crest of the owners. The interiors boasts early classicistic fittings. Since 1975, the palace has been housing a branch of the Wrocław University of Technology.

Jelenia Góra trams – Tram communication operated in Jelenia Góra in the years 1897–1969. Today there isn't much left of it – fragments of the tram line and a plaque can be found near town hall. One of the old tram carriages can be found by the north entrance to the town hall and serves as a souvenir kiosk (the other two trams are placed in front of the tram depot, in Wolności Street and at the bus terminal in Podgórzyn).

== Jelenia Góra districts ==
=== Cieplice Śląskie-Zdrój ===
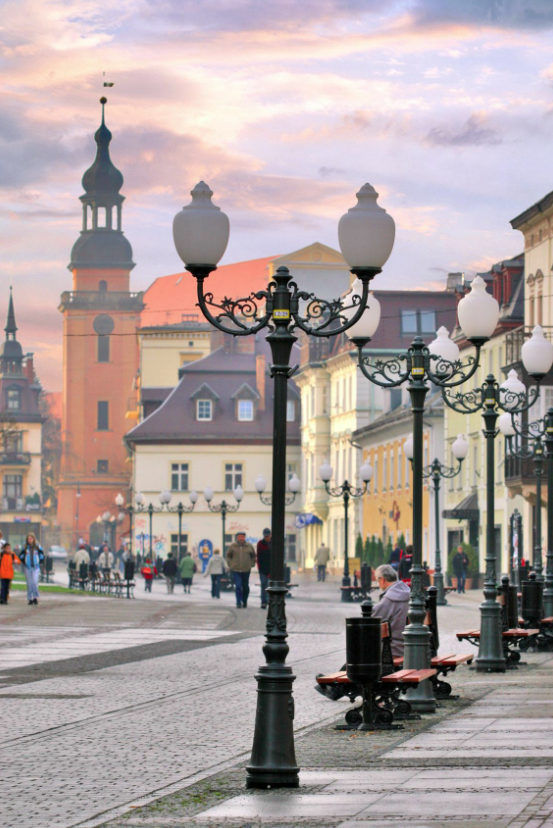
Cieplice Promenade

The first mention of warm, curative springs that gave it their name, come from 1281. The spa was then developed by the Cistercians from nearby Krzeszów in the 15th century, and since the 16th century its fame extended far beyond Silesia and managed to attract flocks of patients, Poles, Czechs, Germans and Lithuanians, including many eminent persons, such as Polish Queen consort Marie Casimire Louise de La Grange d'Arquien, her son Prince James Louis Sobieski, and Princess Izabela Czartoryska. Modern analysis shows that water therapeutic effectiveness is due to sulphur, silicon and fluorine compounds together with the high temperature reaching 90 Celsius degrees. Therapeutic sessions used to be based mainly on baths, today a wide range of treatments in the field of hydrotherapy, inhalation therapy as well as phototherapy, physiotherapy, kinesiotherapy, and electrotherapy.

==== Zdrojowy and Norwegian Parks ====
These two parks are located close to the main pedestrian street of Cieplice. Zdrojowy Park main avenue was created already in 1796, however, the entire park was created in the first half of the 19th century when the Schaffgotschs reconstructed part of the garden into an English garden and made a part of it available to the residents of Cieplice and patients.

At the beginning of the 20th century, owner of paper machine factory Eugen Fülner made several investments towards the spa. One investment was creating a picturesque park, called the Norwegian Park. Norwegian Park owes its name to a wooden building erected in 1909, whose finishing resembles Viking boats.

The Gallery and Zdrojowy Animation Theatre was built in 1797–1800 and designed by the architect Carl Gottlieb Geissler from Wroclaw. Inside there is still a functioning restaurant, a cigar lounge, a reading room and a large concert hall. Theatre was built between 1833 and 1836, it can accommodate up to 270 spectators. Founded by Schaffgotsch family built in the neoclassical style. Currently scene belongs to the Zdrojowy Animation Theater in the Zdrojowy Park.

=== Sobieszów ===
Sobieszów is located along the stream of Wrzosówka and nearby is the Chojnik castle. From the fourteenth century to 1945, the village belonged to the Schaffgotsch family. Karkonosze National Park management is established in Sobieszów. Location area creates favorable conditions for starting here hiking in the Karkonosze Mountains.

=== Chojnik Castle ===
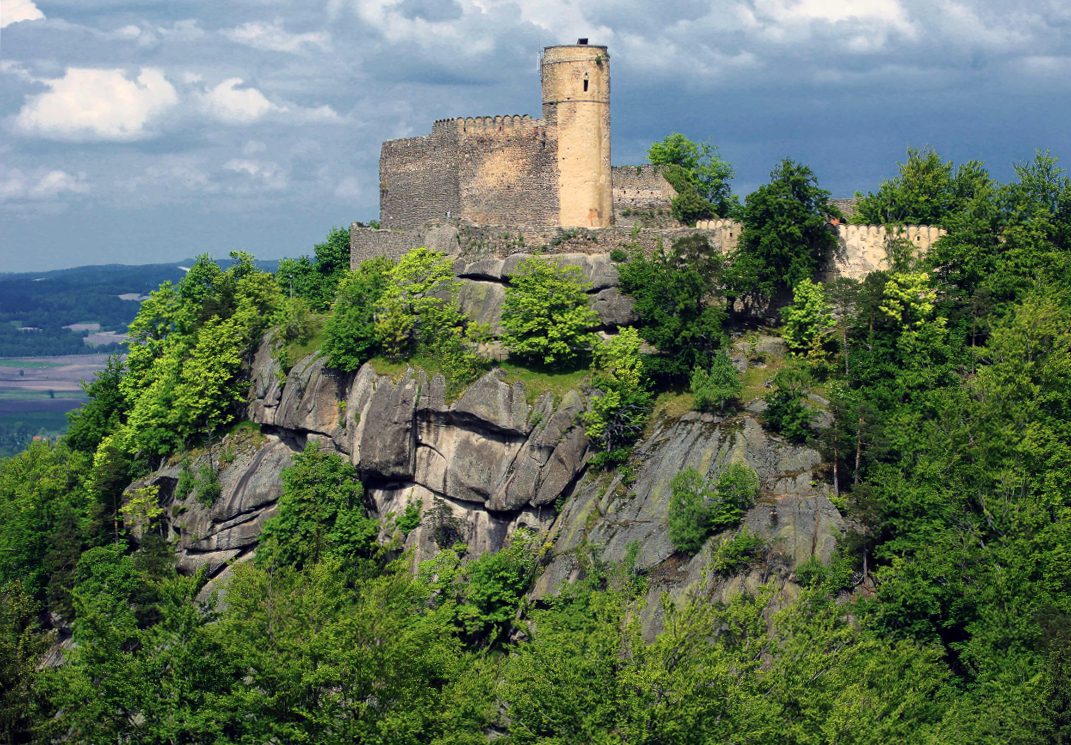
Chojnik Castle

[[Chojnik Castle]] – a castle located near Jelenia Góra-Sobieszów on the top of the Chojnik mountain in Karkonosze Mountains. This mountain rises to a height of 627 meters above sea level, and from the southeast side is a 45-meter cliff plunging into the so-called Hell Valley. The fort is located in a nature reserve, which is the exclave of Karkonosze Mountains National Park.

"Chojnik Golden Bolt" Knight's crossbow tournament – Once a year the picturesque ruins of Chojnik play host to the struggles of knight fellowships. The tournament is accompanied by shows of medieval customs, dances, crafts and warfare.

=== Jagniątków ===
Jagniątków – a district of Jelenia Góra (since 1998). From here leads many trails in the mountains, both pedestrians and cyclists. It is the highest district of Jelenia Gora, and has good communication with the city bus (lines 15 and late-night course line 9). It was founded by Czech refugees in 1651.

==== Divine Mercy Church in Jagniątków ====
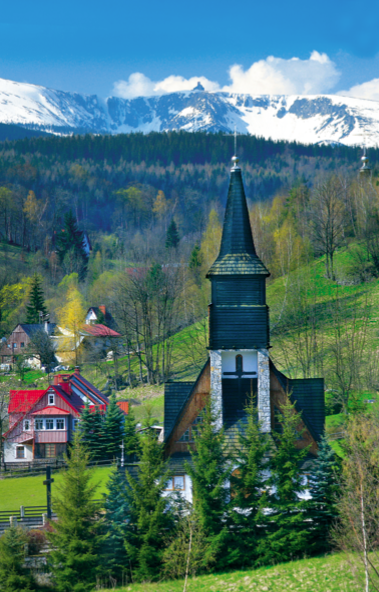
Divine Mercy Church in Jagniątków

The church was erected in the years 1980–1986. Its shape was inspired by the architecture of Podhale. Thanks to this shape the church perfectly inscribes itself into the mountainous landscape.

==== Jagniątkowski Black Cauldron ====
Jagniątkowsk Black Cauldron – glacial cauldron in the Western Sudetes in the Karkonosze Mountains and is located in south-western Poland, in the Western Sudetes in the western part of the band Karkonosze Mountains, in the Karkonosze National Park, north of the Black Pass, on the north-eastern slope of Śmielca and north-western slope of the Czech Stones.

== Sports ==
=== Aviation ===
Owing to natural factors the Jelenia Góra Valley boasts exceptionally good conditions for gliding and hand-gliding. Consequently, the Jelenia Góra airport and the local flying club enjoys much popularity among flying aficionados from Poland and abroad alike.

=== Cycling ===
Jelenia Góra offers many and varied cycling routes like "Bóbr valley trail" (ER-6) or the biking ring road of Jelenia Góra, the Jelenia Góra- Łomnica biking trail. City organizes biking events:

- Jelenia Góra trophy – Maja Włoszczowska MTB Race – a biking race involving the top contenders of the amateurs of the world MTB scene.
- Bike Parade – an entertainment event propagating biking, a healthy lifestyle and active outdoor leisure.
- Dirt Town – bike stunts performed on the Town Hall square and a biking contest on a specially prepared obstacle course.
- In the years 1952–1956, 1979, 1986 and 1999–2007 by the city ran the route of Tour de Pologne, and in 2012 this event has returned to Jelenia Gora.

The FISU selected Jelenia Góra to host the 2014 World University Cycling Championship.

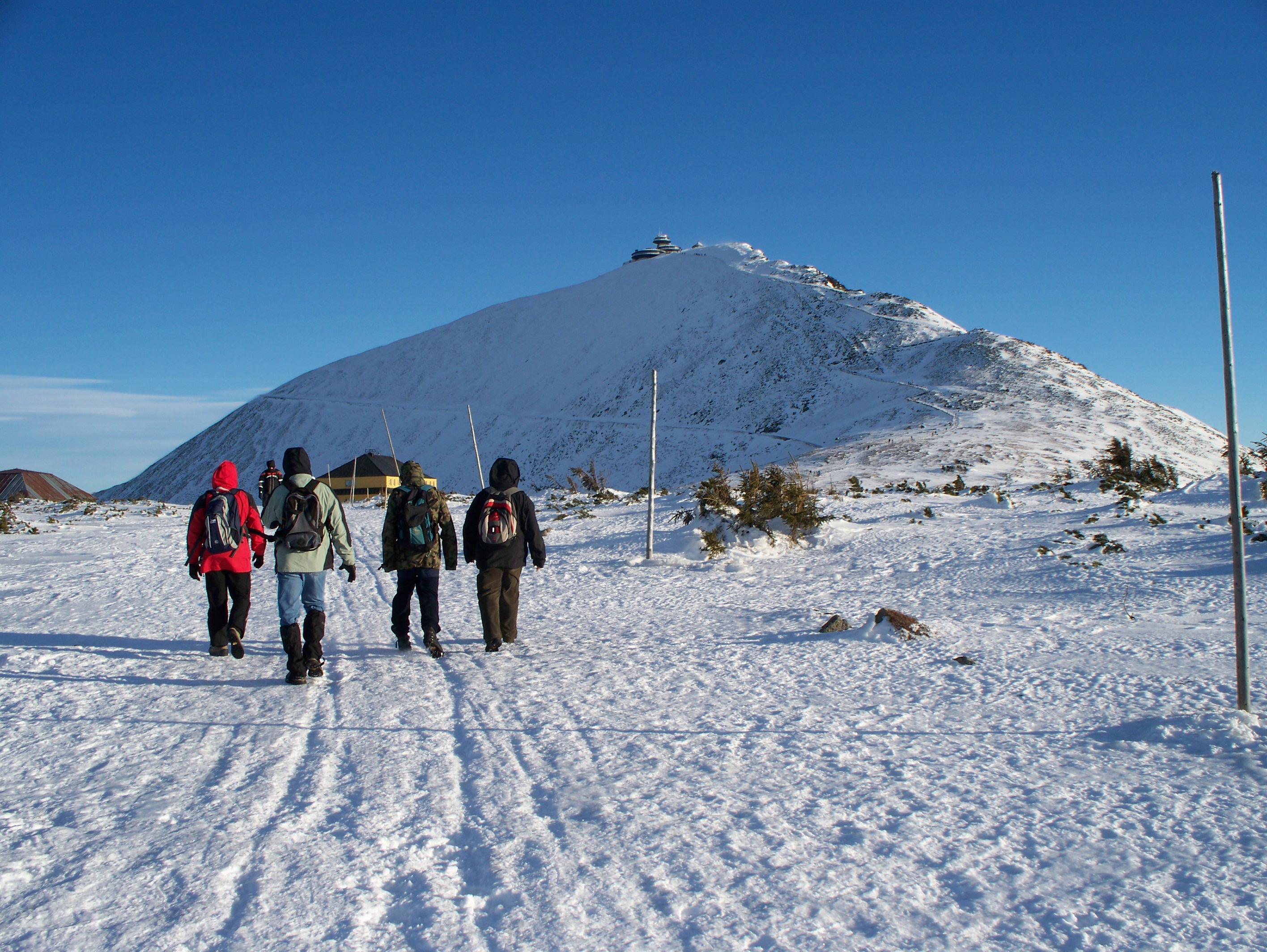
Śnieżka at winter

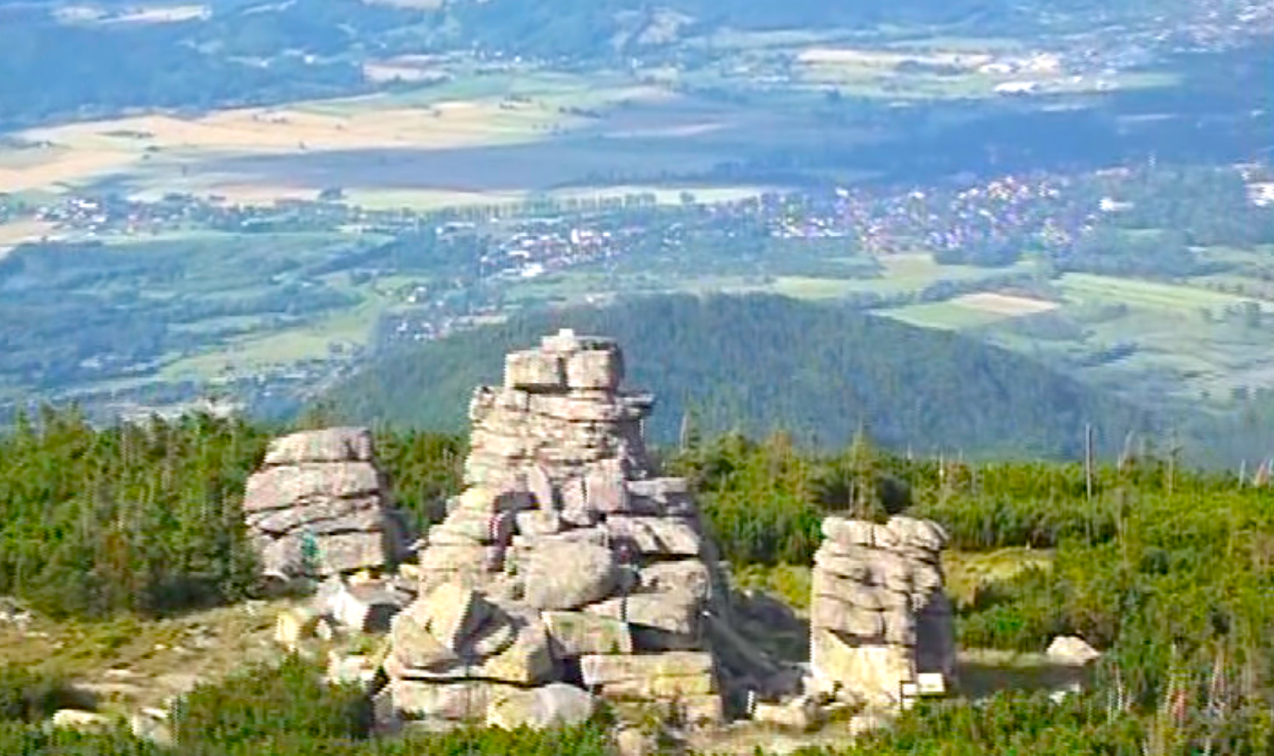
Czech Stones

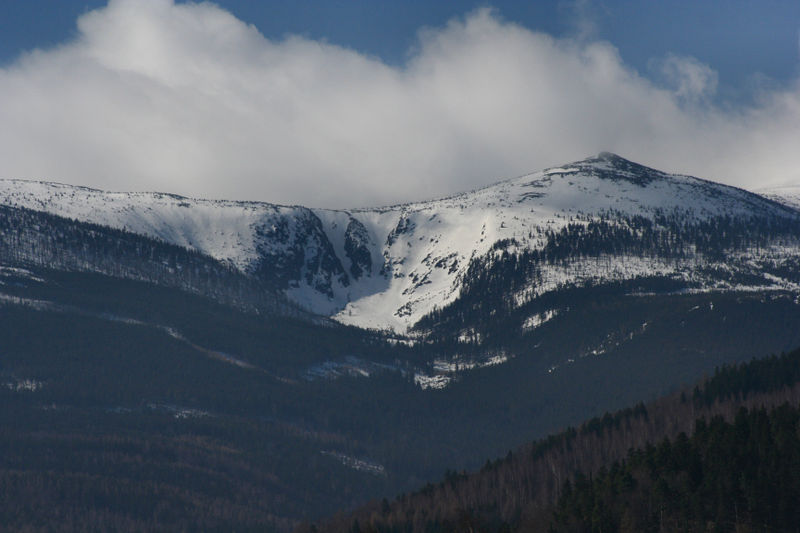
Jagniątkowski Black Cauldron – Glacial cauldron in the Western Sudetes in the Karkonosze Mountains

=== Sport clubs ===
- Vitaral Jelfa Jelenia Góra – women's handball team playing in Polish Ekstraklasa Women's Handball League: 3rd place in 2003/2004 season.
- KPR Jelenia Góra – Women's handball team playing in Polish Ekstraklasa Women's Handball League and in Polish First League
- Karkonosze Jelenia Gora – Polish football club based in Jelenia Góra. In the season 2013/2014 playing in the fourth division.

=== Kayaks ===
Kayakers may admire Jelenia Góra from their favourite perspective, using the water route on the Bóbr river. More informations at PTTK site.

=== Hiking Trail ===
Majestic mountains surrounding the city, offers many great trails for visitors, including a route to the highest peak of the Karkonosze – Śnieżka 1602 meters above the sea. During the mountain expeditions, visitors can stay overnight in mountain shelters like "Strzecha Akademicka", "Samotnia", "Odrodzenie" or "Dom Śląski".

== Twin towns – sister cities ==
Jelenia Góra is twinned with:

- Bautzen, Germany
- Boxberg, Germany
- Cervia, Italy
- Changzhou, China
- Erftstadt, Germany
- Jablonec nad Nisou, Czech Republic
- Randers, Denmark
- Sievierodonetsk, Ukraine
- Tequila, Mexico
- Tyler, Texas, United States
- Valkeakoski, Finland

Friendly cities:

- Heidelberg, Germany

Former twin towns:

- Vladimir, Russia (terminated in 2022 due to the Russian invasion of Ukraine)

== Notable people ==
- Sylwia Bogacka (born 1981), Olympic rifle shooter, silver medalist in London
- Ruth Bré (1862–1911), writer, women's rights advocate
- Babette von Bülow (1850–1927), writer
- Otto Finsch (1839–1917), ethnographer
- Hanna Foltyn-Kubicka (born 1950), politician
- Felix Funke (1865–1932), admiral
- Philipp Gotthard von Schaffgotsch, born and buried here
- Georg Heym (1887–1912), early expressionist writer
- Wilhelm Iwan (1871–1958), author, historian, and theologian
- Karl Joel (1864–1934), philosopher
- Janusz Kudyba (born 1961), footballer
- Dawid Kupczyk (born 1977), bobsledder
- Omenaa Mensah (born 1979), TV presenter
- Carl Püchler (1894–1949), Wehrmacht general
- Manfred T. Reetz (1943–2026), chemist and academic
- Hanna Reitsch (1912–1979), test pilot
- Christian Jakob Salice-Contessa (1767–1825), merchant, politician and writer
- Ryszard Skowronek (born 1949), decathlete
