= Częstochowa University of Technology =

Technical university in Częstochowa, Poland

Coordinates: 50°49′16″N 19°06′42″E

- Politechnika Częstochowska
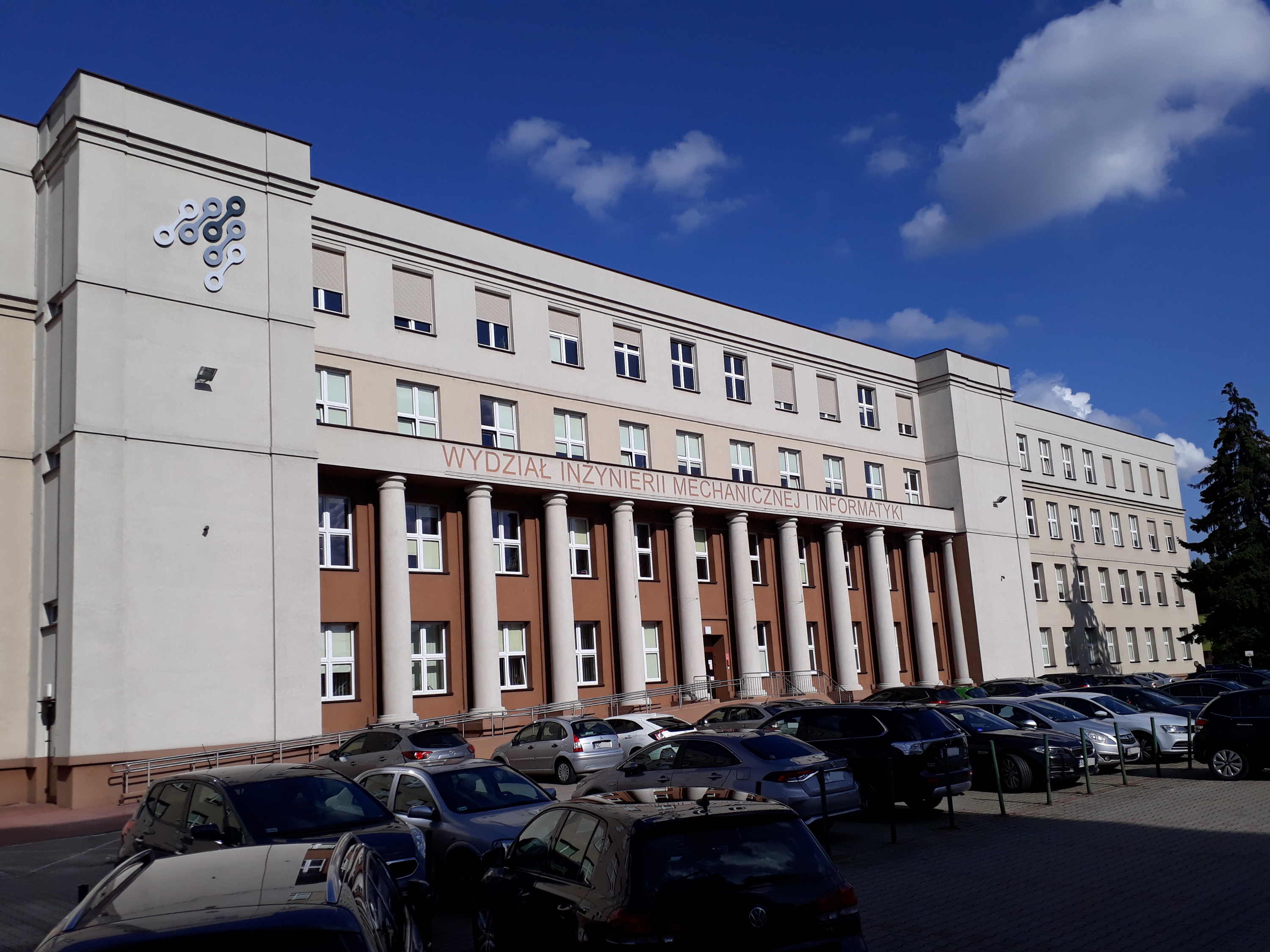
- Latin: Polytechnica Czestochoviensis
- Established: 1949
- Affiliations: Socrates-Erasmus
- Rector: Marek Warzecha
- Students: 5,430 (12.2023)
- Location: ul. J.H. Dąbrowskiego 69, 42-200 Częstochowa, Częstochowa, Poland
- Website: www.pcz.pl

Częstochowa University of Technology (Polish: Politechnika Częstochowska, PCz) is the largest and oldest institution of higher education in Częstochowa, Poland. All faculties of the university have the right to grant doctoral degrees (currently over 300 post-graduate students), and three of them also offer PhD habilitation.

== General information ==
The university was founded in 1949 as the School of Engineering (Szkoła Inżynierska). In 1955, the name was changed to the current Politechnika Częstochowska. The university employs over 1,400 staff, including 840 academic teachers, out of whom 165 are independent scientific researchers. There are around 12,000 students, studying 90 courses within 19 fields of study, full-time and part-time.

For over 9 years the university is home to an academic choir Collegium Cantorum and an Academic Sports Association (Akademicki Związek Sportowy) with 13 different sports divisions.

== Faculties ==
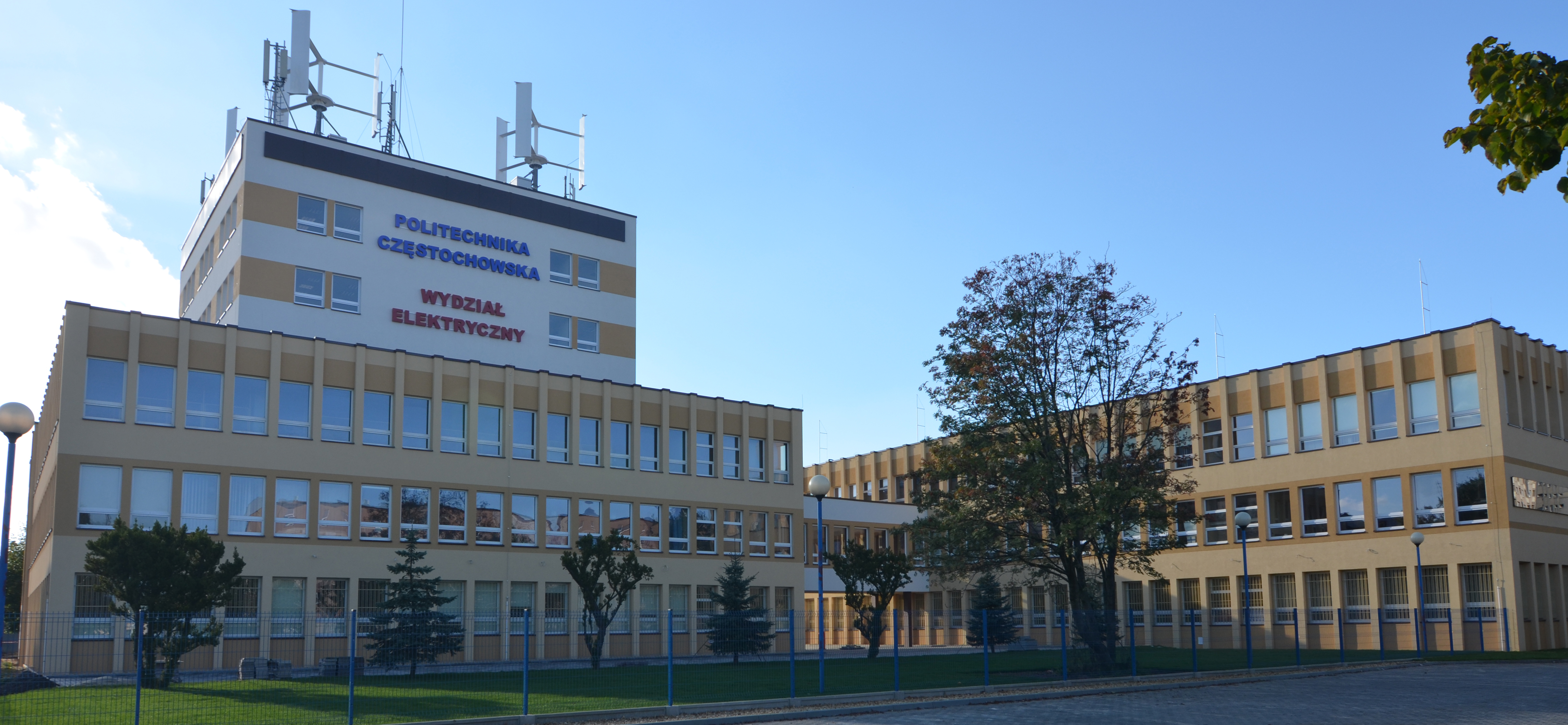
Faculty of Electrical Engineering (Wydział Elektryczny)

Currently there are 6 faculties (wydział):

- Faculty of Mechanical Engineering and Computer Science (Wydział Inżynierii Mechanicznej i Informatyki)
- Faculty of Production Engineering and Materials Technology (Wydział Inżynierii Produkcji i Technologii Materiałów)
- Faculty of Civil Engineering (Wydział Budownictwa)
- Faculty of Electrical Engineering (Wydział Elektryczny)
- Faculty of Infrastructure and Environment (Wydział Infrastruktury i Środowiska)
- Faculty of Management (Wydział Zarządzania)

== Rectors ==
- Jerzy Kołakowski (1949–59)
- Wacław Sakwa (1959–65)
- Jan Grajcar (1965–70)
- Kazimierz Moszoro (1970–74)
- Józef Ledwoń (1974–81)
- Janusz Braszczyński (1981–82)
- Józef Ledwoń (1982–84)
- Janusz Elsner (1984–90)
- Janusz Braszczyński (1990–96)
- Janusz Szopa (1996–2002)
- Henryk Dyja (2002–2005)
- January Bień (2005–2008)
- Maria Nowicka-Skowron (2008–2016)
- Norbert Sczygiol (2016–present)

== Doctors honoris causa ==
- Jan Węglarz, Polish computer scientist
- Olgierd Zienkiewicz, British mathematician and civil engineer of Polish descent
- Tomasz Winnicki, Polish chemist
