= Exaltation of the Holy Cross Church in Jelenia Góra =

Coordinates: 50°54′14″N 15°44′39″E

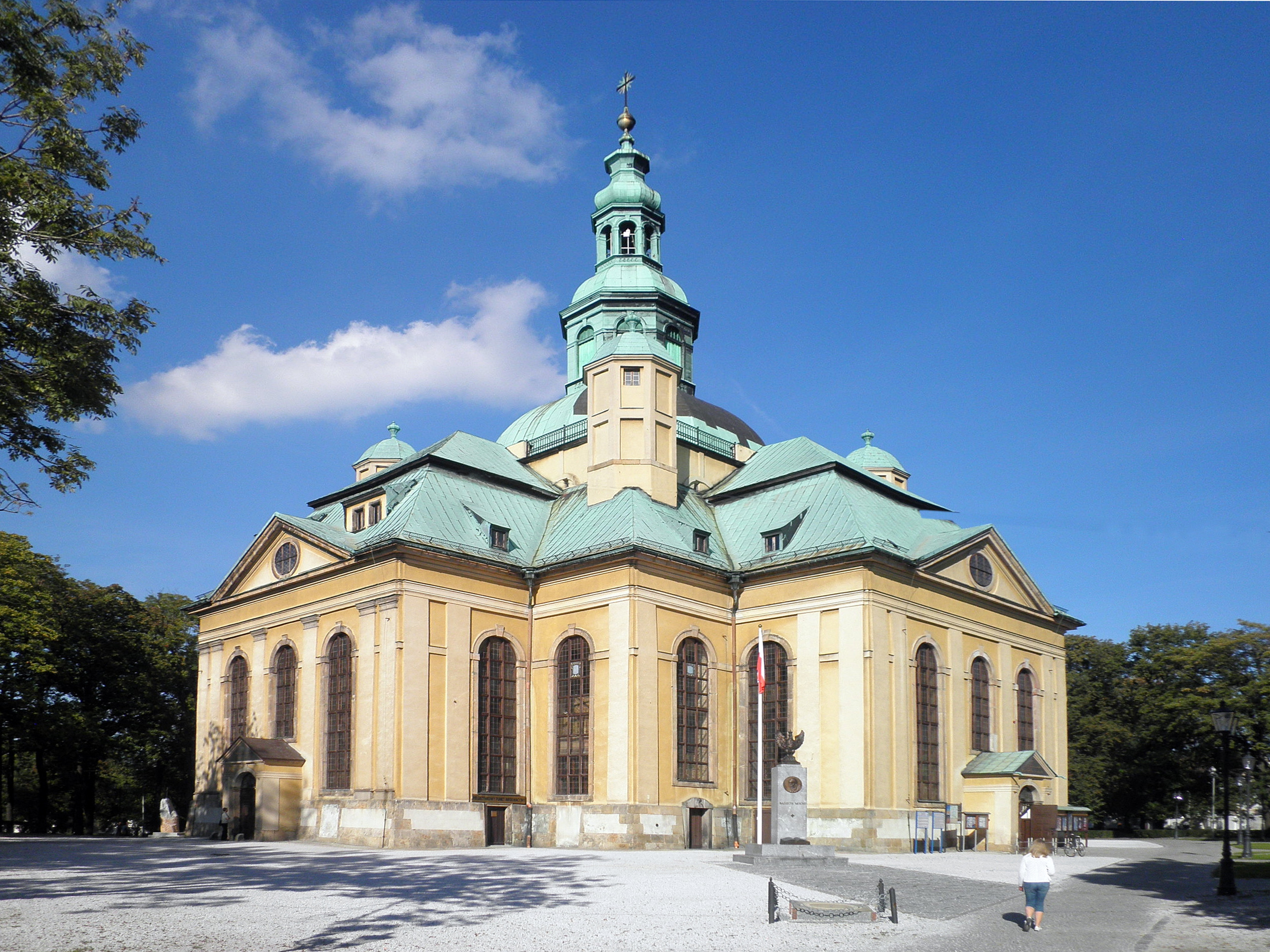
- Exaltation of the Holy Cross Church in Jelenia Góra
- Interactive map of the Exaltation of the Holy Cross Church in Jelenia Góra area

General information
- Architectural style: Baroque
- Location: Jelenia Góra, Poland
- Construction started: 1709
- Completed: 1718

Design and construction
- Architect: Martin Frantz

Exaltation of the Holy Cross Church (Polish: Kościół Podwyższenia Krzyża Świętego) is an originally Lutheran, now Roman Catholic church in Jelenia Góra, Poland. It is one of the Grace Churches (German: Gnadenkirchen), built in Silesia after the intervention of Swedish king Charles XII, who forced Austrian Emperor Joseph I to provide right for Protestants.

The construction of the Exaltation of the Holy Cross Church was begun in 1709 and completed in 1718. It was designed by Martin Frantz on a Greek-cross plan, modelled after the Katarina Church in Stockholm. In 1806 the fire destroyed the stairwell and the cupola of the church, which were reconstructed in the years 1810–1811. The Exaltation of the Holy Cross Church was Lutheran up to 1947, later it became Catholic.

== See also ==
- Katarina Church, Stockholm
- Jesus Church, Cieszyn
