= Karkonosze University of Applied Sciences =

State university in Poland

- Karkonoska Akademia Nauk Stosowanych w Jeleniej Górze
- Former names: Kolegium Karkonoskie, Karkonoska Państwowa Szkoła Wyższa,
- Type: Public
- Established: July 1, 1998
- Affiliations: Socrates-Erasmus
- Chancellor: Dorota Gajda
- Rector: Elżbieta Zieja
- Students: 764 (2022)
- Location: 18 Lwówecka Street, Jelenia Góra, Lower Silesian Voivodeship, Poland; 50.914°N 15.730°E
- Language: Polish
- Nickname: AZS KANS Jelenia Góra
- Website: www.kans.pl
- Location in Poland

The Karkonosze University of Applied Sciences (Polish: Karkonoska Akademia Nauka Stosowanych w Jeleniej Górze; KANS) is a public university in Jelenia Góra, Lower Silesian Voivodeship, Poland. It was established on 1 July 1998 as Karkonosze College (Polish: Kolegium Karkonoskie), and has borne its current name since 2 May 2022.

This college is financed by the Ministry of Science and Higher Education. The educational aim of the college is to provide higher education to people who have no possibility of studying at far-removed academic centres, such as Wrocław.

== History ==
=== Creation ===
The impulse to create the first college of Jelenia Góra, which would have its headquarters in the city, was the work of the Polish Sejm on a law that would allow the creation of State Higher Vocational Schools. This idea was supported by local politicians, the mayor of the city, and representatives of the College of Rectors of Universities from Wrocław and Opole. The efforts were finalized in July of 1998 by the creation of a college which allowed for studies at the bachelor level, which, as the only state college of its type, was named "Kolegium Karkonoskie". It was also one of Poland's first six state colleges.

=== Early years ===
The duties of the very first rector were given by the Minister of Education Mirosław Handke to chemist Tomasz Winnicki, who uptook the mission of creating the new college from zero.

The first academic year begun on 1 October 1998 in two newly created Institutes: of Education and of Languages and Literatures, which became a successor of liquidated at the time Teacher's College in Jelenia Góra.

In 1999 the third educational unit was created - the Institute of Technology. One year later, there were 2 new Institutes: of Western Languages and Institute of Medical Education. The creation of the Institute of Western Languages began the process of joining the college with Teacher's College in Jelenia Góra. On other hand, the Institute of Medical Education was created based upon the Vocational Set of Medical School in Jelenia Góra-Cieplice. The Karkonosze College was one of the very first State Colleges in the country to get permission for establishing bachelor studies in medical sciences.

=== Further development of college ===
When celebrating the new academic year 2003/2004, a new college campus was officially opened at 18 Lwówecka Street. It was also a celebration of 5 years of the college's functioning. In the next academic year, all of the educational and administrative units were in one place. The important changes in the functioning of th college came in academic year 2007/2008, because it was reorganized, transforming the previous 5 Institutes: of Education, Slavic Languages, Technology, Western Languages and of Medical Education in three Faculties: of Humanities, Natural Sciences and Technical. After some years, these became just two: Social Sciences and Humanities, and Natural Sciences and Technology. New academic buildings were opened in the coming years - in 2007, the new Library and Scientific Information Centre. In 2010, the Karkonosze College changed its name to Karkonosze State College in Jelenia Góra. On 2 May 2022, the name was changed to Karkonosze Academy of Applied Sciences in Jelenia Góra. It was possible because the Polish President, Andrzej Duda, in August of 2021, signed the novelisation of the law concerning State Colleges of Vocational Education. The new law allowed for a state college, after fulfilling some requirements, to get the name of "Academy of Applied Sciences".

== Degrees offered ==
KANS offers studies in part-time and full-time mode – bachelor, bachelor of engineering (which last for 7 semester or 3.5 years) or singular master (which last 5 years). There are 16 degrees to choose from (in 2025):

Faculty of Humanities and Social Sciences

- marketing and market communication
- BIG DATA in social and economic analysis
- psychology
- Resocialization with criminology
- English literature and language
- Tourist business

Faculty of Medical and Technical Sciences

- Physiotherapy
- Automation
- Dietetics
- Physical education
- Nursing

The university also offers non-degree postgraduate studies (Polish: studia podyplomowe):

- animation and cultural promotion
- building a brand and e-promotion
- geriatric physiotherapy and care
- German language in business and tourist contacts
- German language in tourism and culture
- studies for teachers
- music and rhythmics in preschool education
- biological renewal
- pupils with special educational needs
- sociotherapy with educational therapy
- educational therapy with artetherapy

In academic year 2020/2021 KANS offered the following educational courses:

- physical recreation instructor training
- language courses
- first aid
- anti-aging cosmetic facial massage
- personal trainer
- summer camp counselor
- personal image management

== Campuses and university buildings ==
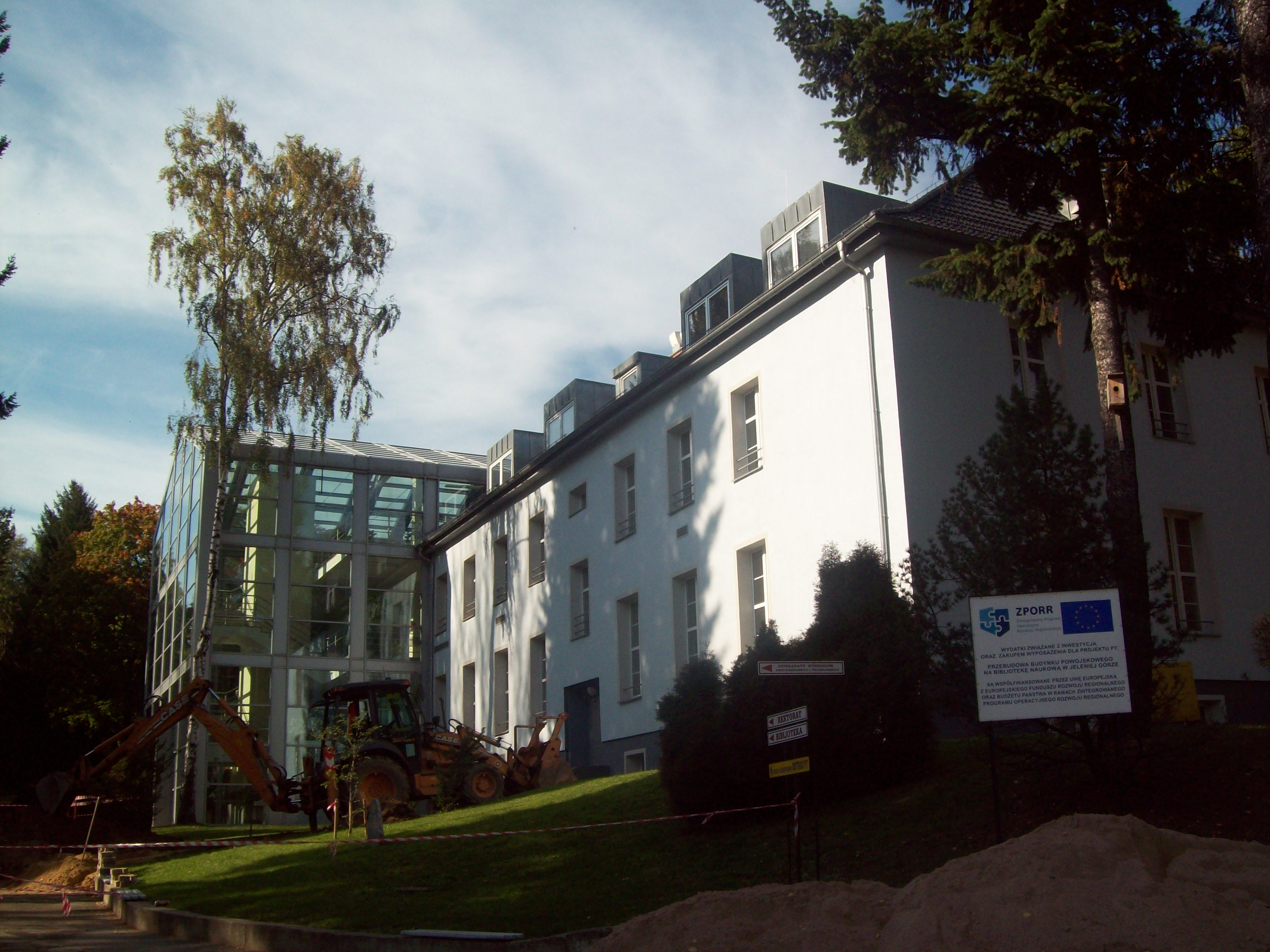
The KANS Library and Scientific Center, created in 2007.

At first, the headquarters of various institutes and the rectorship were located in various parts of Jelenia Góra:

- in Elementary School nr. 7 on 1 May Street 56, there was a temporary rectorate and three rooms of the Institute of Languages and Literature (later renamed as the Institute of Slavic Languages)
- The Institute of Education was housed in the Jelenia Góra branch of the Lower Silesian Faculty of Improving Teachers on 1 May Street 43
- Sport buildings were shared by Gwardia on Nowowiejska Street 43, and the Center of Sport and Recreation of Elementary School nr. 11 on Stanisław Moniuszka Street 9

Established in 1999, the Institute of Technology used buildings made available by the Wrocław University of Technology branch in Cieplice. Before that, the city of Jelenia Góra has gifted KANS with a villa for the needs of the rectorate and administration for renovations on Zamojski 7 Street. At that moment, there was a plan to make the university campus in Cieplice, which was related to the possibility of claiming a building housing the Teacher's College on Cieplicka 16 Street. It became a property of KANS in 2000, housing the Institute of Technology.

The Institute of Medical Education and the Institute of Western Languages were created in the same year. The university classes of the first one were happening in the former Medical School of Anna Rydlówna in Cieplice (Leśna 5 Street). That school possessed a gym hall, remade into an auditorium and a dormitory, which was adapted into a student residence hall. The second institute was a former Teachers' College of Foreign Languages, whose building was located at Wolności 38 Street.

The main campus of KANS was finally located in the northwest part of the city, on the right side of the Bóbr river on Lwówecka Street 18. It was once a college and military barracks with a park - the area is 12,5 ha. It became the property of the college on 1 October 2003. In the first order, the place on campus was reserved for the library and the Center of Scientific Information of KANS, the Department of Teaching, the inter-institute Facility of Job placements, and plenipotents of the Rector for College development and People with disabilities.

With the beginning of the academic year 2004/2005, all didactic and administrative units were moved to the new campus. It was then that the project of rebuilding the former military men's mess into a library and the Center of Scientific Information was finalized in the summer of 2007. Since then, the college has been using the building located on Lwówecka 18 Street.

== Inter-university and international cooperation ==
KANS, from the moment of creation, is cooperating with the universities and academies of Wrocław, such as University of Wrocław, Wrocław University of Technology, Wrocław Medical University, Wrocław University of Economics and Wrocław University of Health and Sport Sciences.

The university has contacts with universities from the Czech Republic and Germany, which cooperate via Academic Coordination Centre of Euroregion Neisse-Nisa-Nysa. The universities have formal agreements of cooperation, with KANS hoping in future to recruit new students from the area of European space of education and research.

== Rectors ==
- 1998–2007: prof. zw. dr hab. inż. Tomasz Winnicki – engineer of environmental protection
- 2007–2015: prof. dr hab. Henryk Gradkowski – language and literature scholar
- 2015–2020: prof. dr hab. Marian Ursel – language and literature scholar
- 2020–2023: dr n. med. Wioletta Boznańska, prof. KANS – pathophysiologist
- 2023: acting rector dr Beata Telążka, prof. KANS
- 2023–2024: acting rector dr Elżbieta Zieja, prof. KANS
- 2024–2028: dr Elżbieta Zieja, prof. KANS

== Bibliography ==
- Księga 10-lecia Kolegium Karkonoskiego, M. Ursel, KK w Jeleniej Górze, Jelenia Góra 2008.
