= Ruth Bré =

Elisabeth Bonnes (Bouness), best known under her pen name Ruth Bré (1862 – 7 December 1911 in Herischdorf, today Jelenia Góra), was a German advocate for matrilineality and women's rights, a writer, journalist, playwright and radical critic of patriarchy. Bré was the founder of the Bund für Mutterschutz, an organization that aimed to improve women's standing in law, economics, and society.

== Life ==
Ruth Bré was born out of wedlock. The names of her parents were kept a secret. She had at least one brother. Bré worked as a teacher, engaged in public debates on children's education, and wrote plays that were publicly performed.

The name Ruth Bré was a pseudonym. The word Bré is thought to be the initial letters of the last name Elisabeth-Rothmund-Bonnes, in reverse. Rothmund was the name of her biological mother. She published her earliest writings under the pseudonym Elisabeth Bouness (alternate spelling Bouneß), and her writings on the women's movement under the pseudonym Ruth Bré.

Bré's grave, on the Cavalier-Berg in Herischdorf (today Jelenia Góra), no longer exists.

== Advocate for women's and mothers' rights ==
Following her early retirement she became active in the women's movement in Germany, of which she belonged to the radical wing. From this point on she wrote treatises on the rights of mothers, a novel and articles, and tried her hand as the editor of a newspaper. She impressed her listeners with, among other qualities, her fiery rhetoric.

Ruth Bré devoted her life to improving the situation of single mothers and their children. In her writings she criticized the conditions of motherhood in patriarchal society and urged: "Women, give birth not to others...but to yourselves! […] The woman can exist without the state, but not the state without the woman." Among other causes, Bré fought against the firing of married female civil servants (the so-called Lehrerinnenzölibat, prescribed celibacy for female teachers) and for freely chosen motherhood. In Bré's view, motherhood was not the precondition for a woman's psychological and physical health. Her aim was the reintroduction of matrilineality, and her writings expressed a veneration for the mother, in physical as well as spiritual form.

In Leipzig on 12 November 1904, Bré founded the Bund für Mutterschutz (Society for the Protection of Mothers). Among the signatories of the Bund's founding document were reformer Friedrich Landmann and local official and writer Heinrich Meyer. The Bund für Mutterschutz quickly became successful, finding many prominent supporters. Yet relatively swiftly, following conflicts over the direction of the organization, Bré was defeated by her opponent Helene Stöcker, who usurped her position and pushed the Bund in the direction of sexual reform, reflected in the name Deutscher Bund für Mutterschutz und Sexualreform, adopted in 1908. Bré and her comrades accused Stöcker of having stolen Bré's intellectual property.

Bré founded at least one mothers' colony on the model of matriarchal societies.

== Selected writings ==
- Elisabeth Bouneß: Die Frau an der Jahrhundertwende. Breslau 1900. (Play).
- Elisabeth Bouness: Kaiserworte, Fürsorgegesetz und Lehrerschaft. Betrachtungen aus Liebe zum Vaterlande. Leipzig 1903.
- Ruth Bré: Das Recht auf die Mutterschaft: Eine Forderung zur Bekämpfung der Prostitution, der Frauen- und Geschlechtskrankheiten. Leipzig 1903.
- Ruth Bré: Staatskinder oder Mutterrecht? Versuche zur Erlösung aus dem sexuellen und wirtschaftlichen Elend. Leipzig 1904.
- Ruth Bré: Keine Alimentationsklage mehr! Schutz den Müttern! Ein Weckruf an alle, die eine Mutter hatten. Leipzig 1905.
- Ruth Bré: Ecce Mater! (Siehe eine Mutter!). Leipzig 1905. (Novel).
- Ruth Bré: "Geboren am Weihnachtsabend". In: Die Neue Generation, Vol. 5, No. 2/1909, pp. 81–85.
- Ruth Bré: "Zunächst andere Ehegesetze!" In: Hedwig Dohm et al. (ed.): Ehe? Zur Reform der sexuellen Moral, Berlin 1911, pp. 177–191.
