= Christian Jakob Salice-Contessa =

German poet and writer

Christian Jakob Salice-Contessa (1767–1825) was a German poet and writer.

== Biography ==
Contessa was born in Silesia in 1767 into a wealthy Italian family that had emigrated from Salò to Lake Como. His father was a linen wholesaler. His brother, Karl Wilhelm Salice-Contessa, was also a writer.

Contessa studied at the Jesuit college in Breslau from 1782 to 1784, before studying commerce in Hamburg. In 1793, he began working in the family business as a manager. In 1797, he and an old school friend, Joseph Zerboni di Sposetti, formed a secret society to fight corruption. However, he and Zerboni were imprisoned in 1798. About 1812, he purchased an old Benedictine monastery in Liebenthal, which would become a frequent meeting place for the Brothers of Saint Serapion. In 1814, he became president of the Hirschberg town council.

Contessa literary works drew often on history, particularly Silesian legends from the Hirschberg region.

Contessa died in 1825 in Liebenthal. His widow sold the monastery in 1829 and it later became the premises of a Catholic girls' school

== Works ==
- Hermann von Hartenstein. Scenes from the Middle Ages (1793)
- Almanzor
- Hedwig von Wolfsstein (1794) Gutsch
- Alfred, historical play (1809)
- Dramatische Spiele und Erzählungen, 1-2 (1812-1814)
- The Lustgarten of the Riesengebirge (1823)
