= Joseph Zerboni di Sposetti =

German philosopher (1766–1831)

Joseph Johann Baptist Andreas von Zerboni di Sposetti (23 May 1766 – 23 May 1831) was a German philosopher.

== Biography ==
In 1796, he wrote to the governor of Silesia a letter in which he set forth the absurdity of granting to the nobility exalted privileges through right of birth. Knowledge of the letter reaching Frederick William III, he was imprisoned for three years on a charge of high treason. When his case was brought to trial he was freed, with no political disability, and later received various official appointments.
