= Michael Huey (artist) =

American contemporary artist

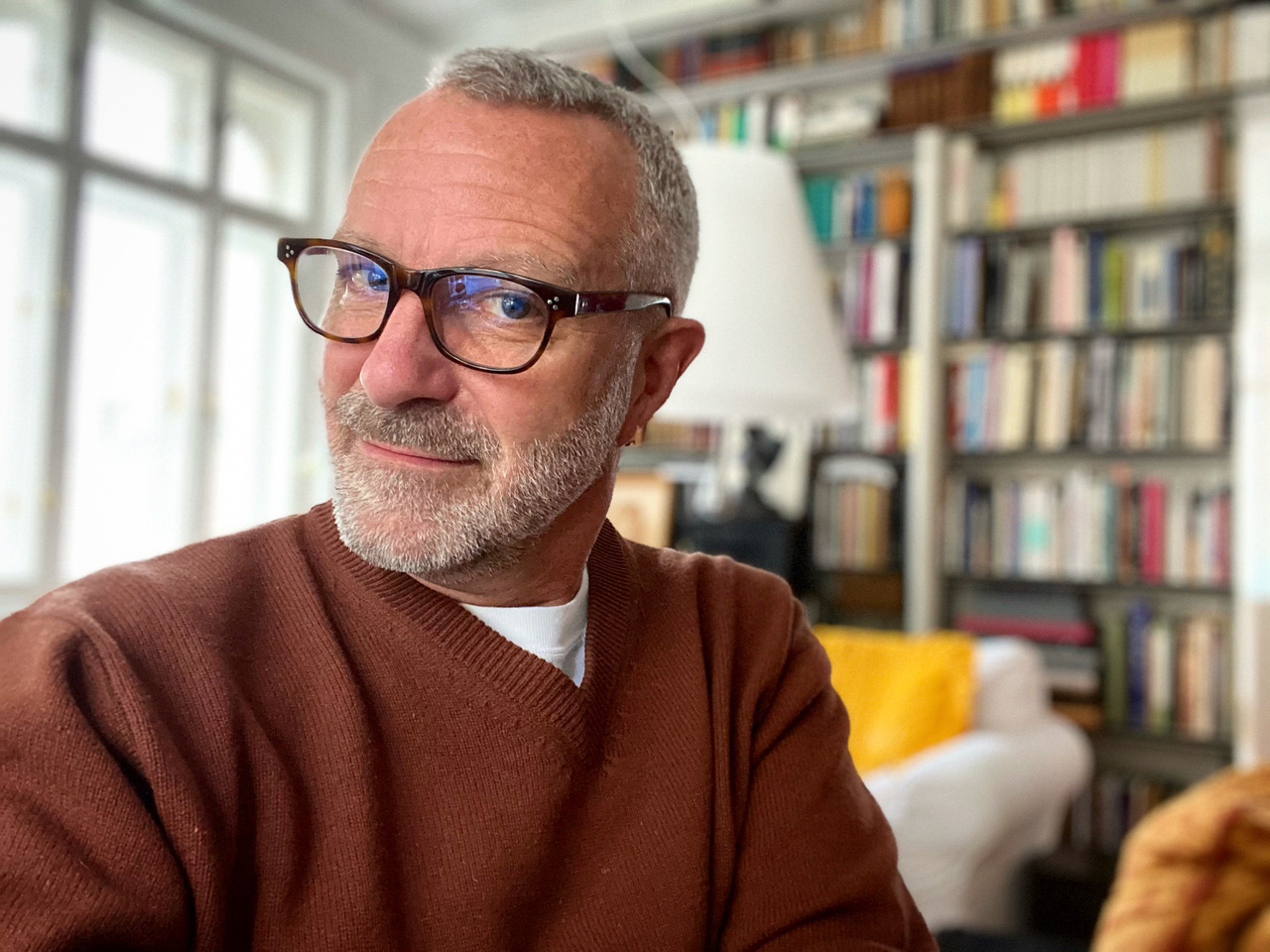
- Born: September 21, 1964 (age 61); Traverse City, Michigan
- Education: Amherst College, University of Vienna
- Known for: Contemporary art, installations, video art

Michael Huey (born September 21, 1964) is an American contemporary artist based in Vienna, Austria. He often employs found photography and archival resources to create new photographic images, objects, installations, and videos. His work has been shown in Vienna, Berlin, Rome, London, Lisbon, Sofia, Cleveland, and New York City, and written about in Art in America, Artforum, The Wall Street Journal, and The New Yorker.

== Background ==
Huey was born in Traverse City, Michigan. He graduated from Amherst College in 1987 with a degree in German Studies. He has lived in Vienna since 1989, and received a master's degree in art history at the University of Vienna in 1999. He is married to Viennese art historian Christian Witt-Dörring. Individual works by Huey have been shown at the Kunsthalle Wien, the Sigmund Freud Museum in Vienna, the Museum der Moderne Salzburg, the Mead Art Museum in Amherst, Massachusetts, and the Cleveland Museum of Art. In 2014 he joined the Secession, the Viennese artists’ association founded in 1897 by Gustav Klimt, Koloman Moser, Josef Hoffmann, and Joseph Maria Olbrich, among others.

== Career ==
Huey’s artistic practice engages with archival materials, documents, and photographic traditions. His projects often examine themes of absence, loss, and preservation, drawing on his background in art history and writing.

=== Writing and editorial contributions ===
Alongside his work as an artist, Huey has also published extensively, first as a staff member of The Christian Science Monitor, and more recently as a memoirist writing about his family's roots in Chicago and Leelanau County, Michigan. He is a regular contributor to the London-based magazine The World of Interiors and has written about art and design for exhibition catalogues, newspapers, and magazines in both Europe and the United States.

=== Exhibitions ===
Huey has presented his work widely in solo, tandem, and trio exhibitions across Europe and the United States. In Vienna, he has shown repeatedly at Galerie Reinthaler, including Piggyback (with Florian Nährer, 2023), Family Tree (2017), Boy’s Room (2017), and The Darling of Decay (2014). His long-standing engagement with questions of memory and preservation was also highlighted in Proof at the Austrian Frederick and Lillian Kiesler Private Foundation (2015) and Ghost Stories at Schikanedergasse 2 (2022). Earlier presentations include Archivaria at the Sigmund Freud Museum in Vienna (2012), Don’t Say Things at Kunsthalle Wien (2009), and his first solo exhibition Full Death at Galerie Ruyter (2005). Internationally, Huey has exhibited at Newman Popiashvili Gallery in New York (China Cupboard, 2011; Keep in Safe Place, 2007), Josh Lilley Gallery in London (Story Problems, 2010), Song Song in Vienna (ASH, inc., 2009), and Charim Galerie (Betsy and I Killed the Bear, 2007). He has also taken part in collaborative trio shows such as Labor Bestiarium Wunderkammer (Eisenstadt, 2019), Absolute Duration (Lisbon, 2017), and A Place in the East (Lisbon, 2017), underscoring the range and international scope of his practice.

== Style and themes ==
Huey’s work often draws from personal and found archives reworking photographs and objects to address ideas of preservation, narrative, and the unseen fragments of experience. He regards his process as a form of “rehabilitation,” bringing overlooked or trivialized materials into renewed visibility. His installations evoke a haunting sense of presence amid absence, engaging with themes of disintegration, memory, and endurance.

== Selected publications ==
- Huey, Michael (2026). Unpredictable Weather. The Sunny, Surprising, Sad Case of Count Felix ‘Wetti’ Schaffgotsche 1904–1942. Vienna, Austria: Album Verlag. ISBN 978-3-85164-222-3.
- Huey, Michael (2021). Inside Stories: Writing About Home. Vienna, Austria: Album Verlag. ISBN 978-3-85164-197-4.
- Huey, Michael (2013). Straight as the Pine, Sturdy as the Oak: Skipper & Cora Beals and Major & Helen Huey in the Early Years of Camp Leelanau for Boys, the Leelanau Schools, and the Homestead in Glen Arbor. Vienna, Austria: Schlebrügge.Editor. ISBN 978-3-902833-38-9.
- Huey, Michael (2012). Archivaria: Sigmund Freud Museum. Vienna, Austria: Schlebrügge Editor. ISBN 978-3-902833-29-7.
- Huey, Michael (2011). Dearie: the Louis Betts Portrait of Harriet King Huey. Vienna, Austria: Schlebrugge.editor. ISBN 978-3-85160-196-1.
- Huey, Michael (2011). China Cupboard/Houseguests. Vienna, Austria: Schlebrügge Editor. ISBN 978-3-85160-191-6.
- Huey, Michael; Marcus, J. S. (2007). Betsy and I Killed the Bear: Charim Galerie. Vienna, Austria: Schlebrügge. ISBN 978-3-85160-101-5.
- Huey, Michael; Asenbaum, Günther Stefan; Kunsthistorisches Museum Wien; Neue Galerie New York, eds. (2003). Viennese Silver: Modern Design 1780-1918 (1. Aufl ed.). Ostfildern: Hatje Cantz Verlag GmbH & Co. KG. ISBN 978-3-7757-1317-7.
