= Schaffgotsch family =

Silesian noble family

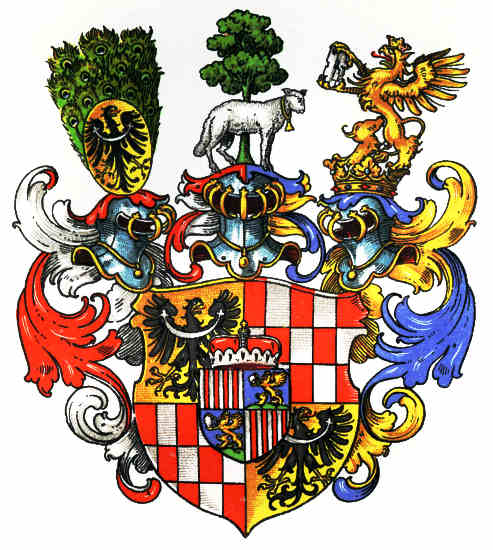
Coat of arms of Counts von Schaffgotsch

The Schaffgotsch family is an old and influential Silesian nobility which dates back to the thirteenth century. Some of its members played important roles in the public life of Bohemia, then Habsburg monarchy and later Prussia.

== History ==
Around 1240, the first Schaffgotsch appears in a Silesian document as Sibotho de nobili Familia Ovium (ovium is the Latin word for "sheep", the translation of the German word Schaf(f)). According to tradition, Sibotho came in the entourage of Duke Henry I the Bearded and his wife Hedwig of Andechs.

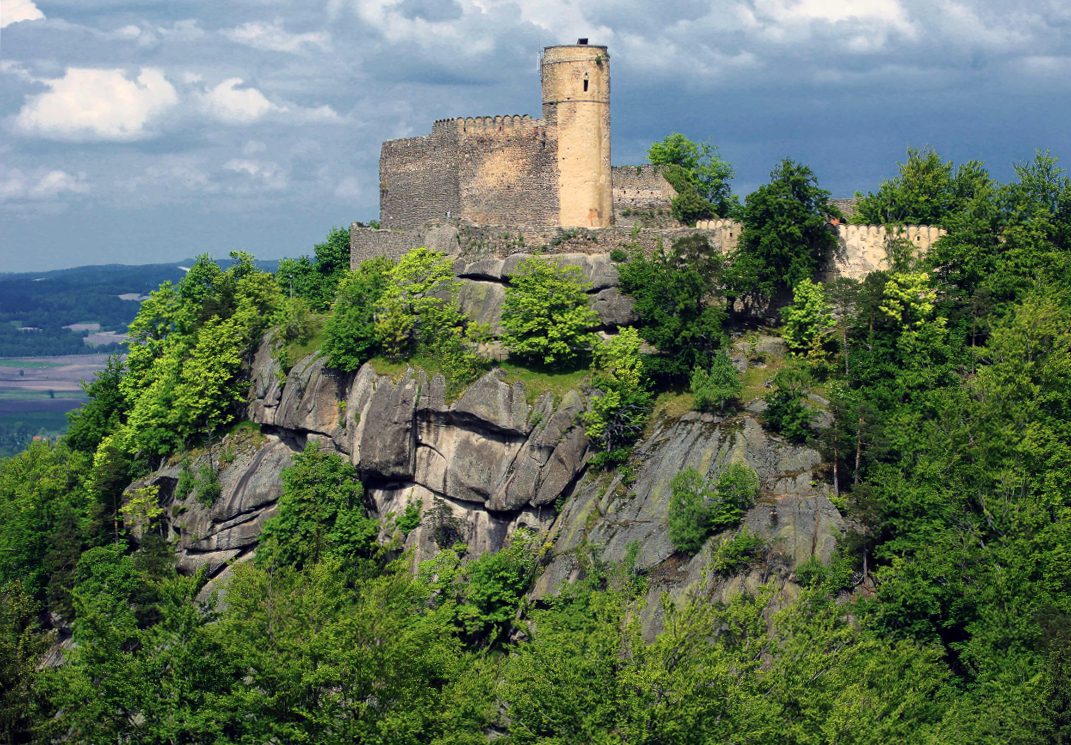
Kynast (Chojnik) Castle

One of Sibotho's successors, the knight Gotsche II Schoff (†1420), bought extensive possessions in the foreland of the Giant Mountains (Riesengebirge) and Jizera Mountains (Isergebirge) at the end of the fourteenth century: the Kynast and Greiffenstein dominions. The Schaffgotsch family thus became the most important noble family in the Jelenia Góra Valley (Hirschberger Tal). In 1403, Gotsche II donated the church at Warmbrunn to the Cistercian provost. His family cherished the memory of Gotsche II Schoff, the originator of their wealth, by adopting the sobriquet "Gotsch". Later, both names were connected as Schaffgotsch.

Gotsche II's son Hans (†1469) was the first of the family to be chancellor, court judge, and governor (German: Landeshauptmann) of the Principality of Świdnica-Jawor (Schweidnitz-Jauer). With his sons Anton, Kaspar, and Ulrich, the Schaffgotsch family split into three branches.

Anton (†1508) established the Bohemian branch, whose Seifersdorf and Kreppelhof-Reußendorf-Ullersdorf lines died out in the seventeenth century. This branch became Bohemian barons in 1674 and counts (Czech: hrabě) in 1681. The most notable members of the branch were:

- Christoph Wilhelm (1687–1768), who was Landeshauptmann (provincial governor) of Silesia
- Johann Ernst Anton (1685–1768), Supreme Burgrave of Bohemia
- Johann Prokop (1748–1813), first Bishop of Budweis
- Anton Ernst (1804–70), Bishop of Brünn

The branch, which until 1945 resided chiefly in eastern Bohemia, died out in 1993.

The branch established by Hans's son Ulrich (1453–1543) ceased to exist in 1661; Christoph (1552–1601), grandson of Kaspar (1476–1534), had already succeeded to Ulrich's domain of Greiffenstein as early as 1578. Christoph, a Protestant, was the first ancestor of the Silesian branch of the family, which in 1766 split into the lines of Kynast-Warmbrunn and Wildschütz; Wildschütz line, which resided in Austrian Silesia (later Czechoslovakia), died out in the first half of the twentieth century.

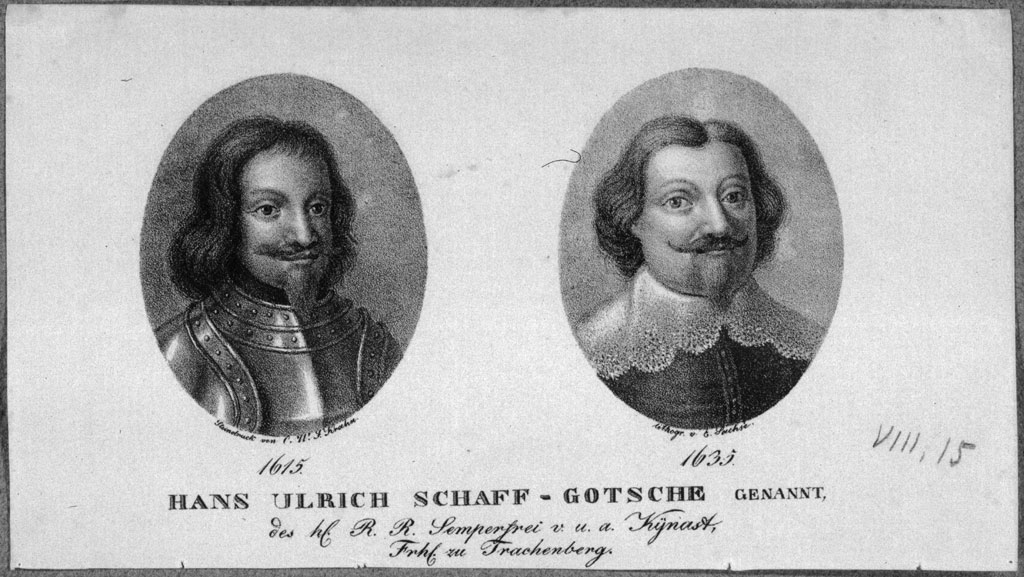
Hans Ulrich von Schaffgotsch (1595–1635)

Christoph's son, Hans Ulrich (1595–1635), a Protestant like his father, was the only Schaffgotsch who married into a dynastic house: his wife, Barbara Agnes was a princess of Liegnitz-Brieg. (Note: A descendant of the House of Ascania through her mother, Princess Anna Marie of Anhalt-Zerbst, who was the daughter of Joachim Ernst, Duke of Anhalt; through her father, Barbara Agnes descended from dukes of Silesia and from Władysław II the Exile.) Hans Ulrich received all rights of a Silesian sovereign and was awarded the title Semperfrei by the Holy Roman emperor. As an imperial general, he served during the Thirty Years' War under Wallenstein but signed the first Pilsen Revers, which the emperor considered a betrayal. Hans Ulrich was beheaded and the family were deprived of all their possessions.

His son Christoph Leopold (1632–1703) converted to Roman Catholicism and recovered all estates except Trachenberg. In 1654, Christoph Leopold became a count and was made imperial legate in Poland-Lithuania. In 1683, he accompanied king John III Sobieski at the Battle of Vienna as the ambassador of the emperor. He was court tutor and court judge in Schweidnitz and Jauer, and later president of the Silesian (royal) High Office (Oberamt), i.e. governor of Silesia. His son Johann Anton Gotthard (1675–1742), created an Imperial Count, was the last president of that office before the seizure of the province by Prussia.

After Kynast Castle had burnt down, struck by lightning in 1675, the family moved to nearby Warmbrunn Castle, an early 17th-century renaissance building. It also burnt down in 1777 and was replaced from 1784 with a large neoclassicism palace which remained the main residence of the head of the family until 1945.

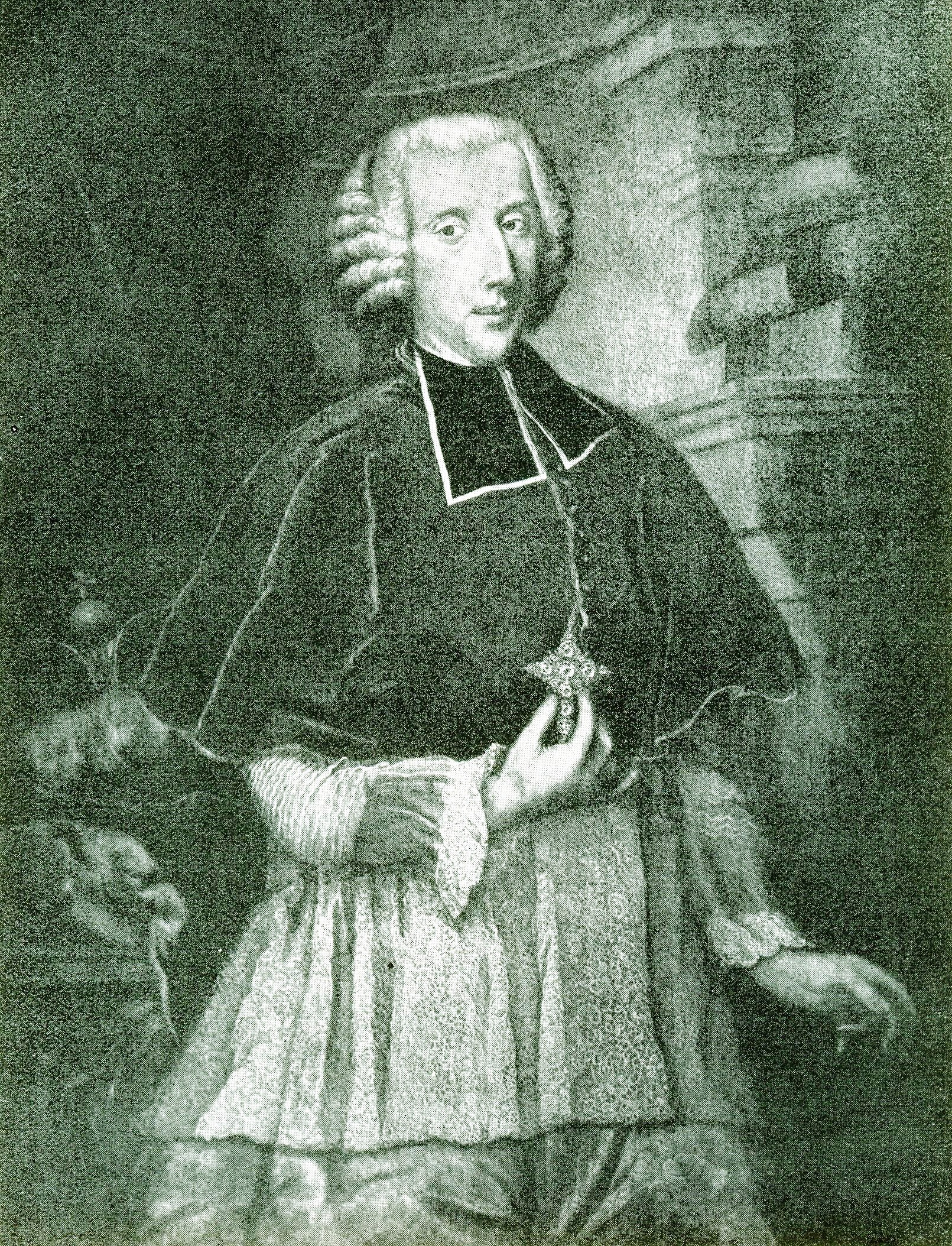
Philipp Gotthard von Schaffgotsch (1715–1795), Bishop of Breslau

After the Prussian capture of Silesia, Philipp Gotthard von Schaffgotsch (1715–1795) became Bishop of Breslau, proposed by Frederick the Great who also made him a prince (as Bishop of Breslau he was ex officio Prince-Bishop and Duke of Nysa). When, during the Seven Years' War, the bishop went into exile in Bohemia, the king banned him for lifetime from returning.

In the following generation, Johann Nepomuk Gotthard (1732–1808) received the title of "Erblandhofmeister". The family gained a seat in the Prussian House of Lords. In the first half of the nineteenth century, the family again split, into the Lower Silesian line of Warmbrunn-Kynast and the Upper Silesian of Koppitz. Due to the hot springs at Warmbrunn, the counts built a spa house and a theater in the early 19th century which became a fashionable retreat. When the Cistercian provost that Gotsche II Schoff had founded at Warmbrunn in 1381 was secularized in 1810, it became owned by the comital family and housed their library with abour 80,000 volumes and other collections.

Count Hans Ulrich von Schaffgotsch (1831–1915) had married Johanna Gryczik in 1858, the adopted daughter and sole heir of zinc mine industrialist Karl Godulla and thus became one of the most important industrialists in Prussia. Their descendants, the Upper Silesian line, or Koppitz branch of the family, owned this huge business empire until 1945.

The Lower Silesian line, with its large possessions in and around the Giant and Jizera Mountains, was considered the second wealthiest family of the region before World War I. In the 1930s, the last lord of Warmbrunn-Kynast, Friedrich (1883–1947), owned 27,668 hectares, the sixth largest estate in Prussia. In 1923 Anna Schaffgotsch (née zu Salm-Reifferscheidt-Raitz) inherited – from her uncle Count Joseph von Wallis – Niederleis Castle in Lower Austria, which is still owned by her descendants.

In 1935, Averell Harriman, chairman of the Union Pacific Railroad, tasked Felix Schaffgotsche (of Austria) with finding a location for a Union Pacific "resort investment" in the western United States. In January 1936, Felix notified Harriman that he had found a location outside Ketchum, Idaho, that would soon become the site of Union Pacific's Sun Valley Resort. During the resort's construction, he returned to Austria to recruit instructors for the Sun Valley ski school, who he confided to actor David Niven were, "all Nazis." Felix Schaffgotsche returned to the U.S. in time for the resort's opening, and remained a central figure in Sun Valley's early development. He returned to Europe after the German invasion of Czechoslovakia in 1939, and in the summer of 1940 entered the Wehrmacht Lehrregiment Brandenburg z.b.V. 800, eventually rising to the position of Unteroffizier, or corporal. He was killed fighting in the Caucasus on 11 August 1942, aged 38.

After World War II, most members of the Schaffgotsch family were expelled from their homes because they were ethnic Germans, while Polish and Czechoslovak authorities confiscated their properties.

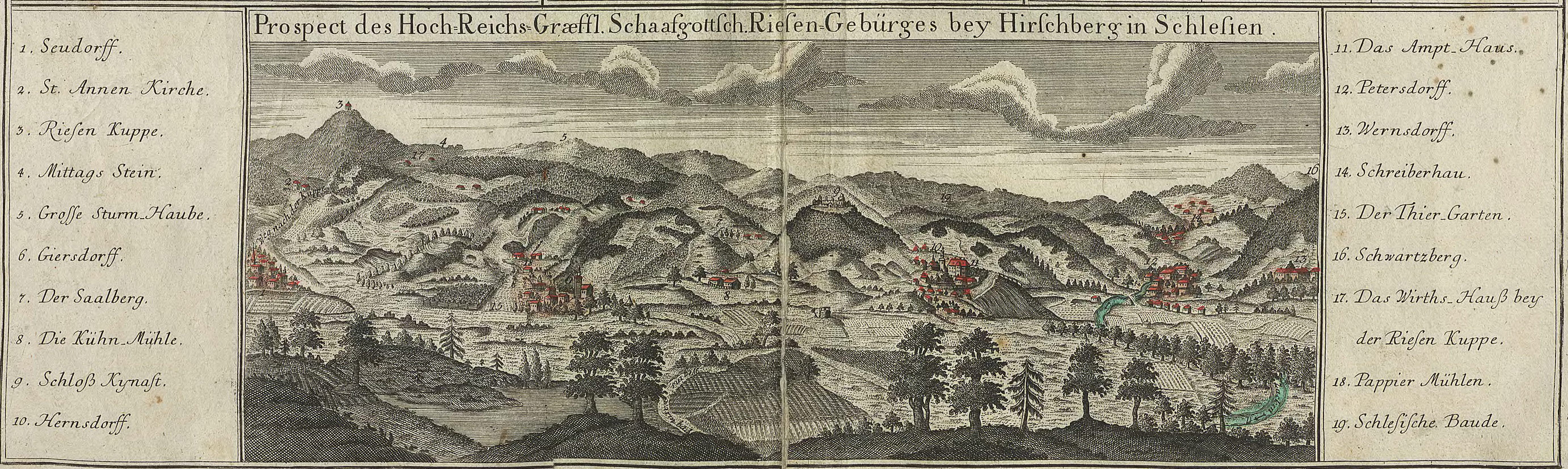
View of the Giant Mountains (from the north side) and the Schaffgotsch-owned comital estates in the eighteenth century

== Family castles ==
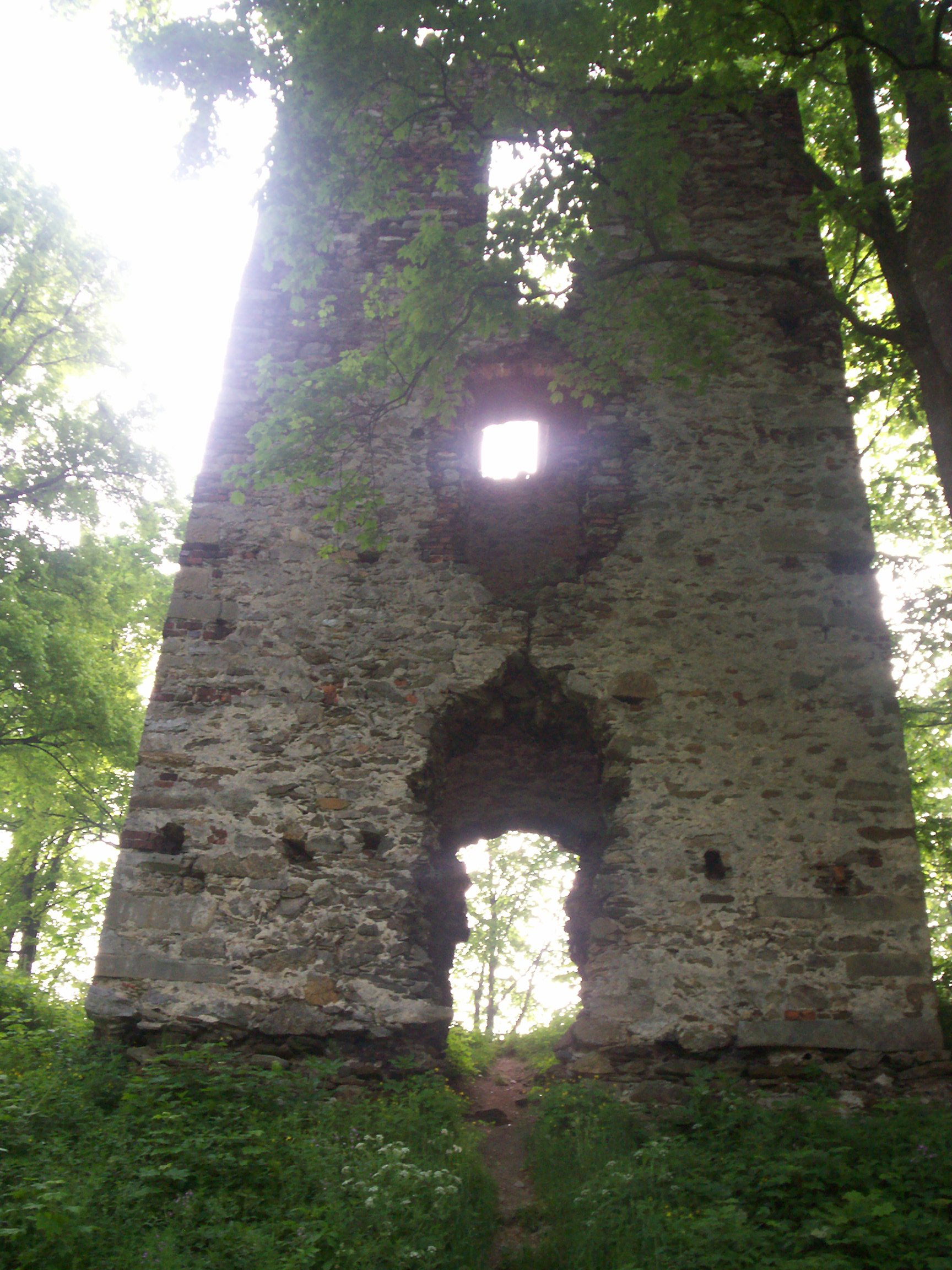
Stara Kamienica Castle

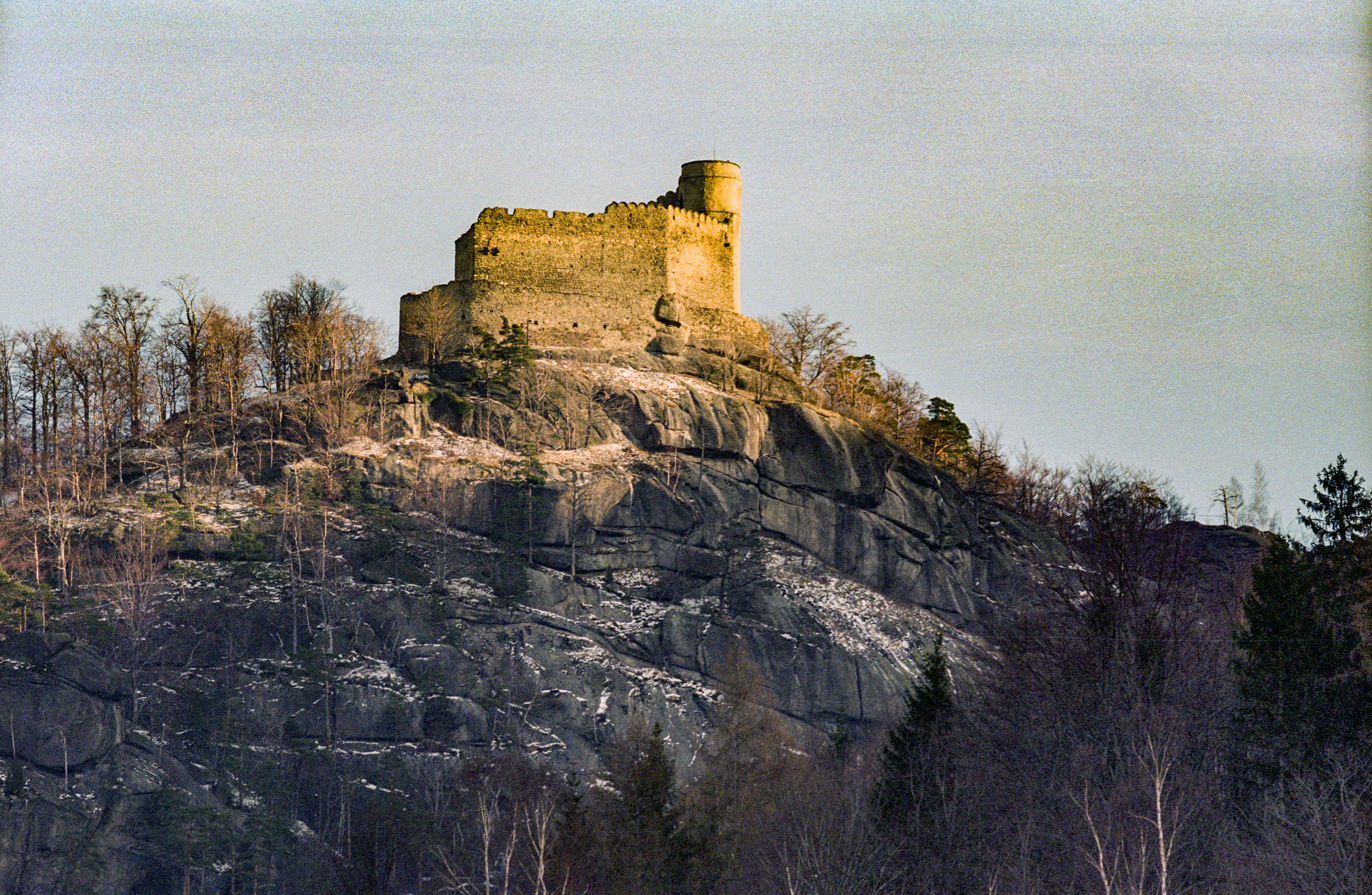
Kynast (Chojnik) Castle

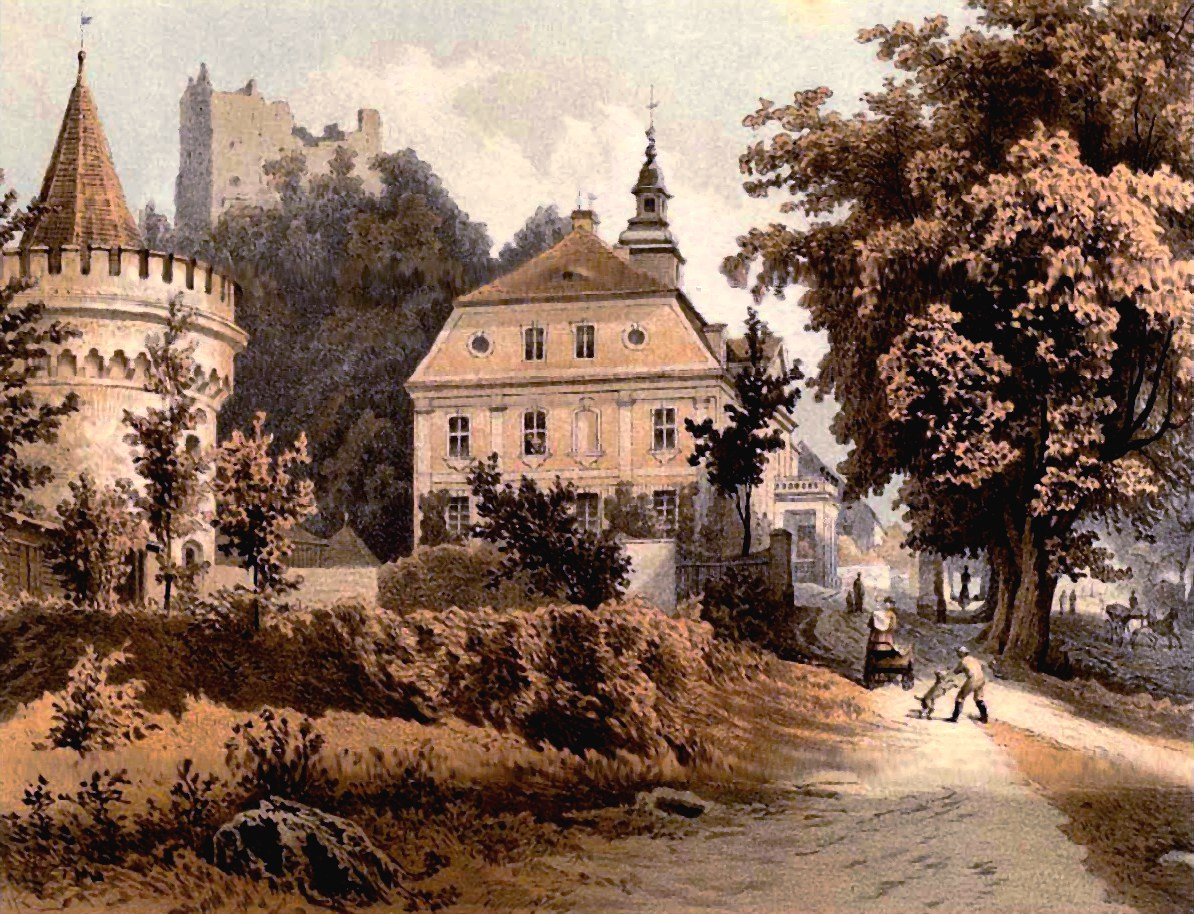
Greiffenstein Castle at Gryfów Śląski (c. 1870)

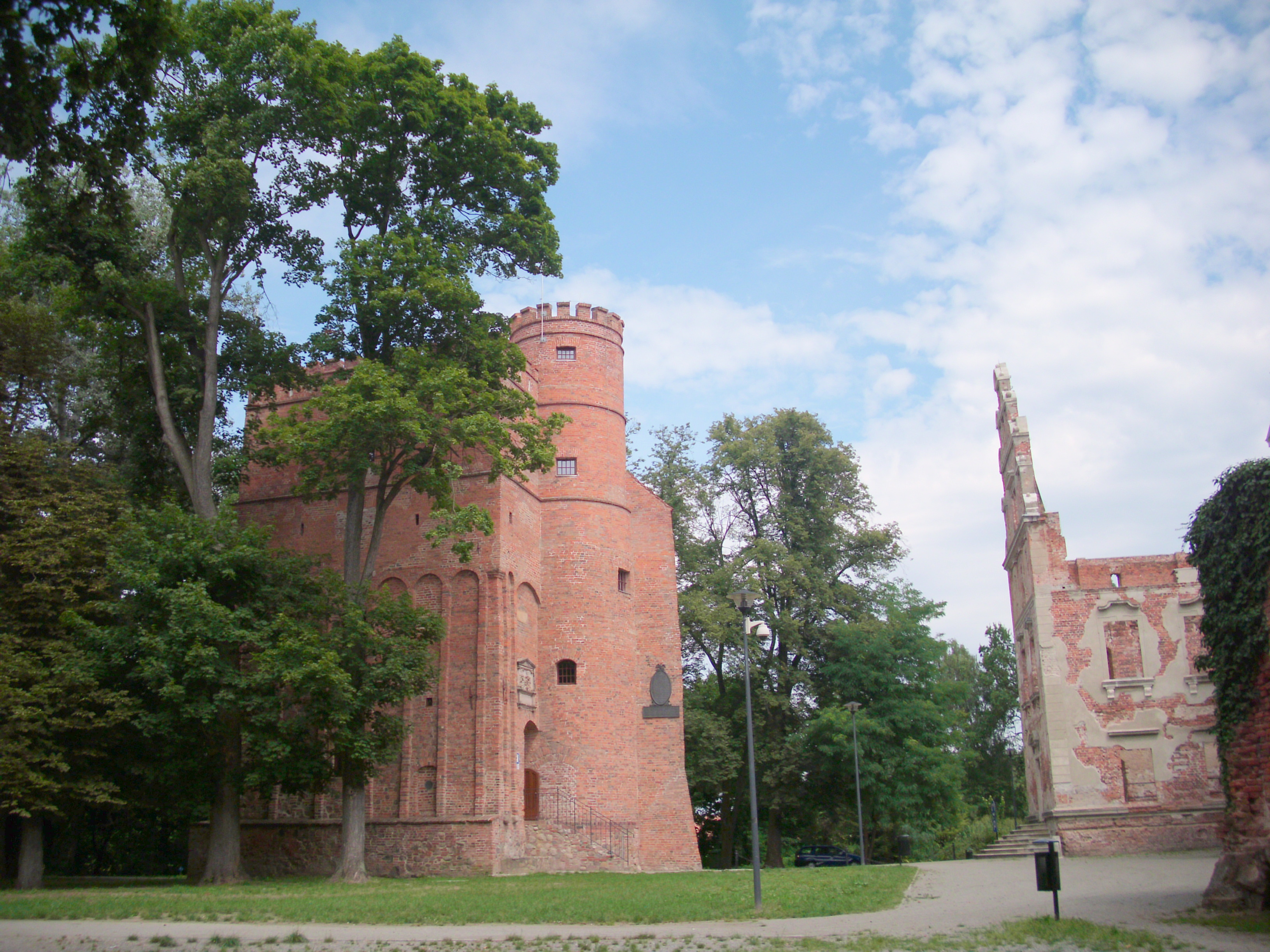
Trachenberg Castle

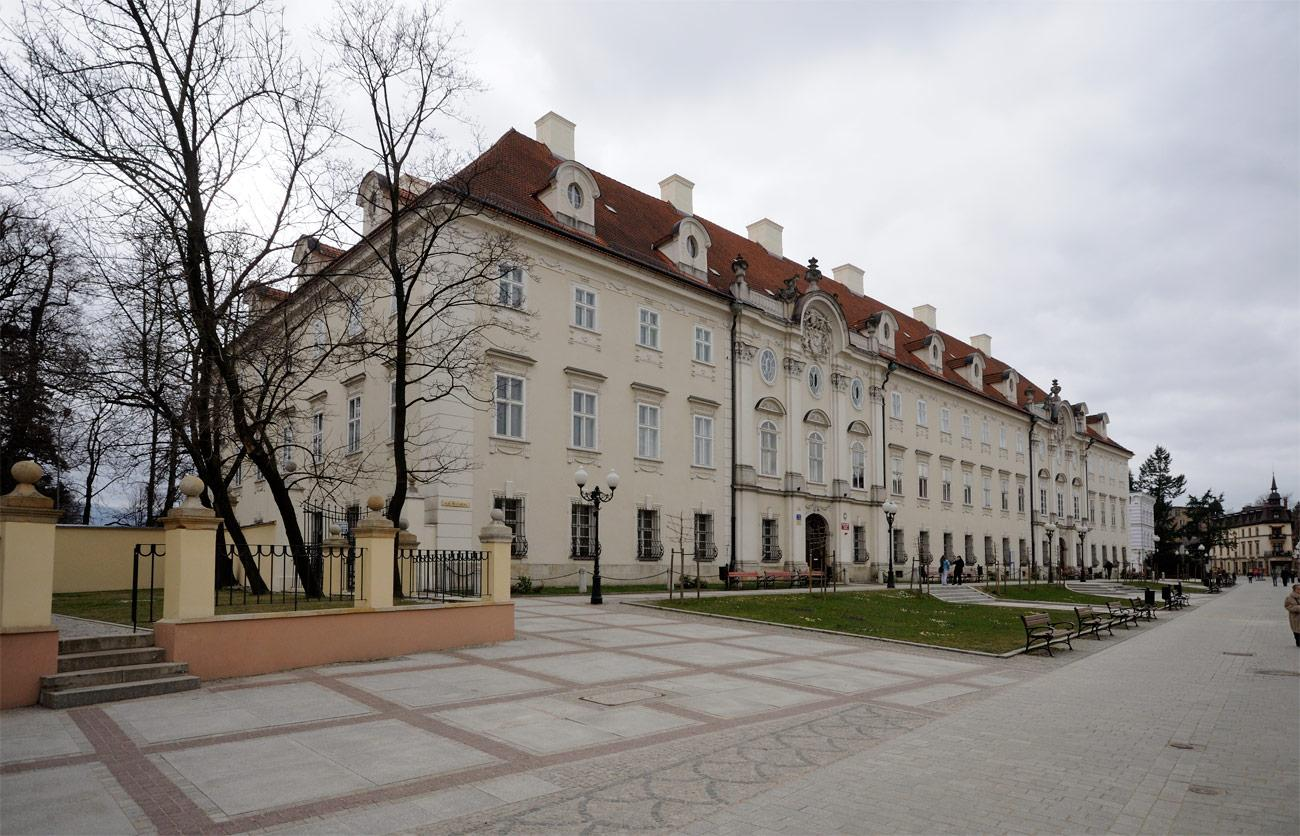
Warmbrunn Palace

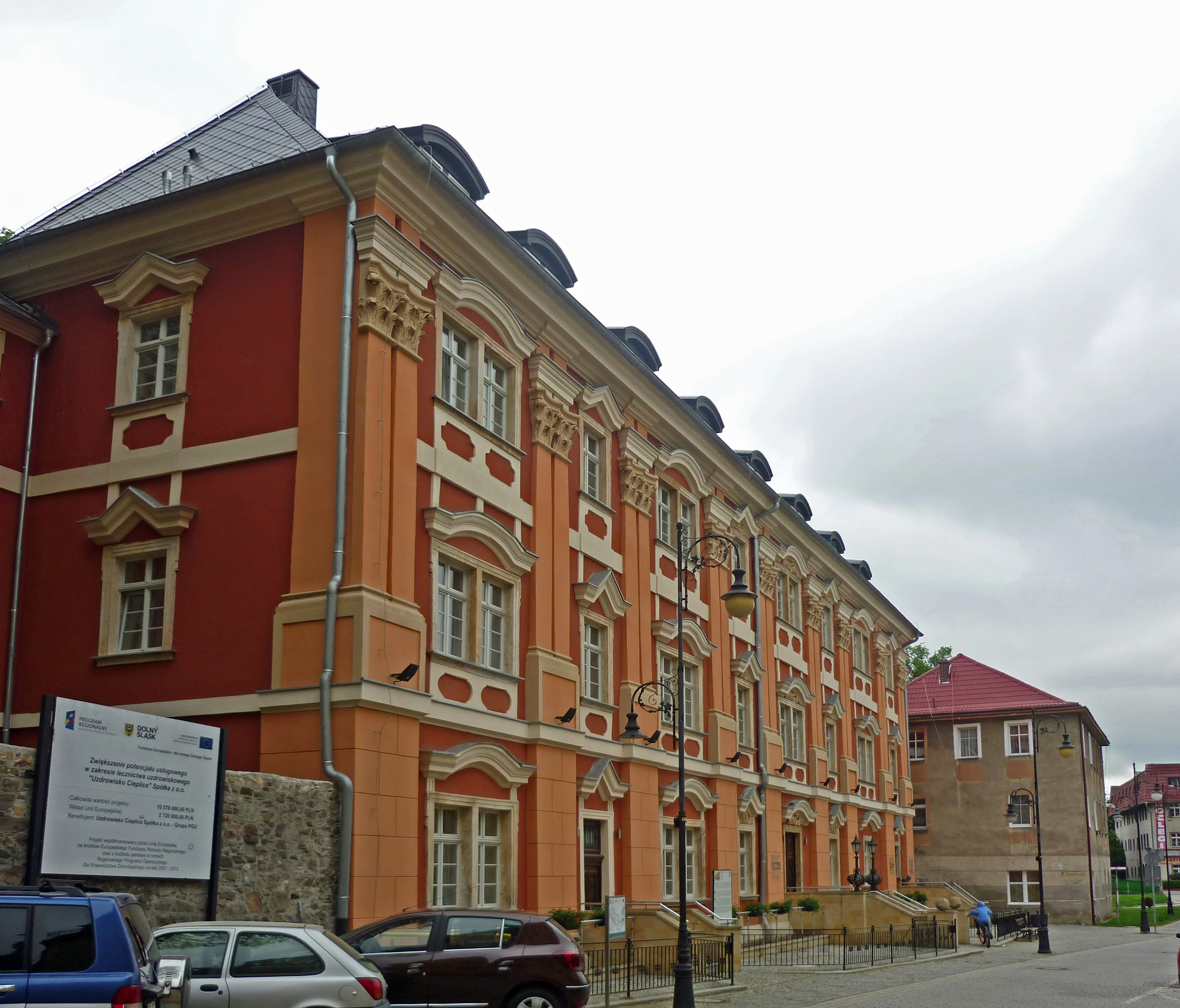
Warmbrunn Monastery

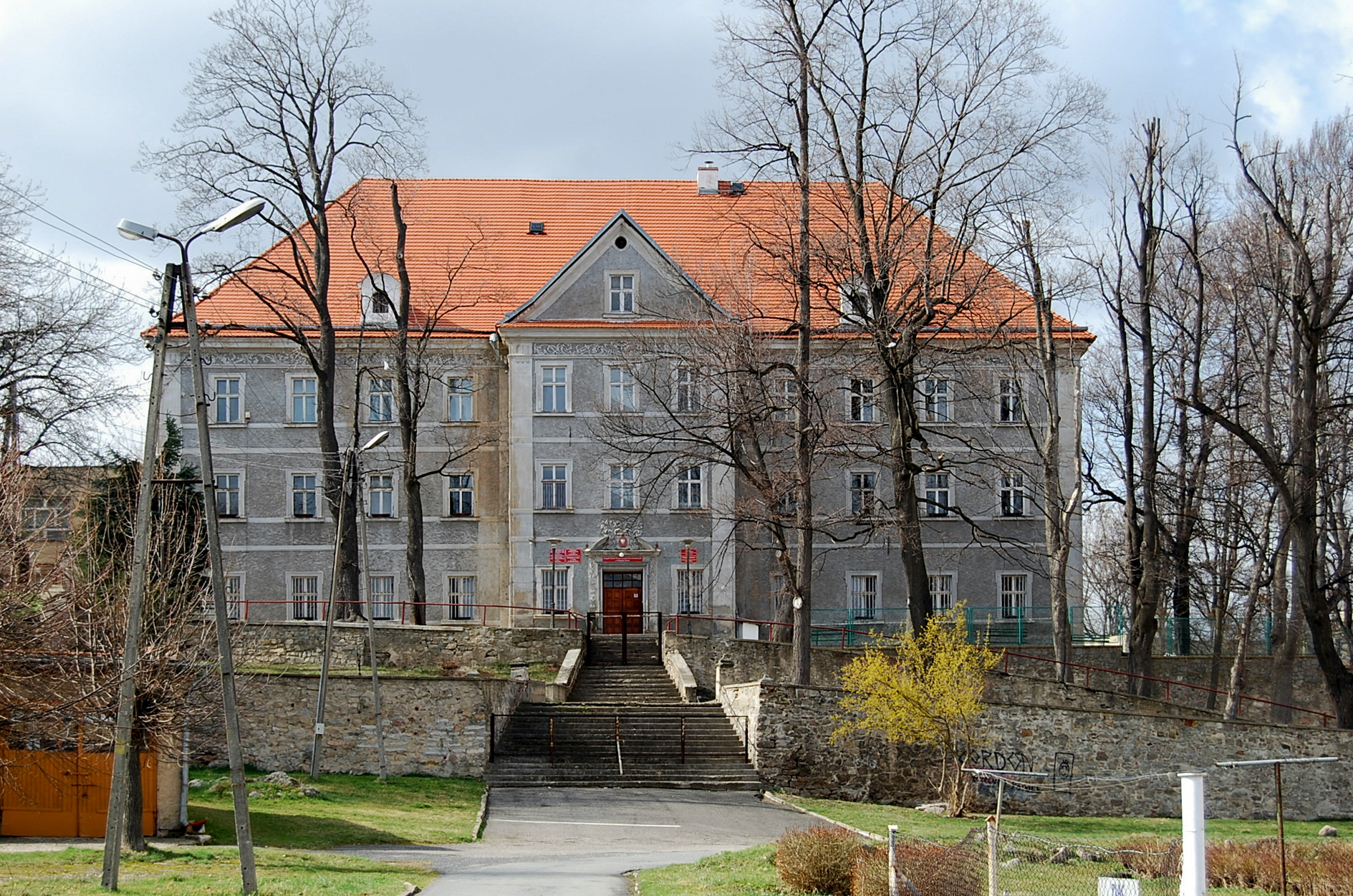
Hermsdorf unterm Kynast Castle

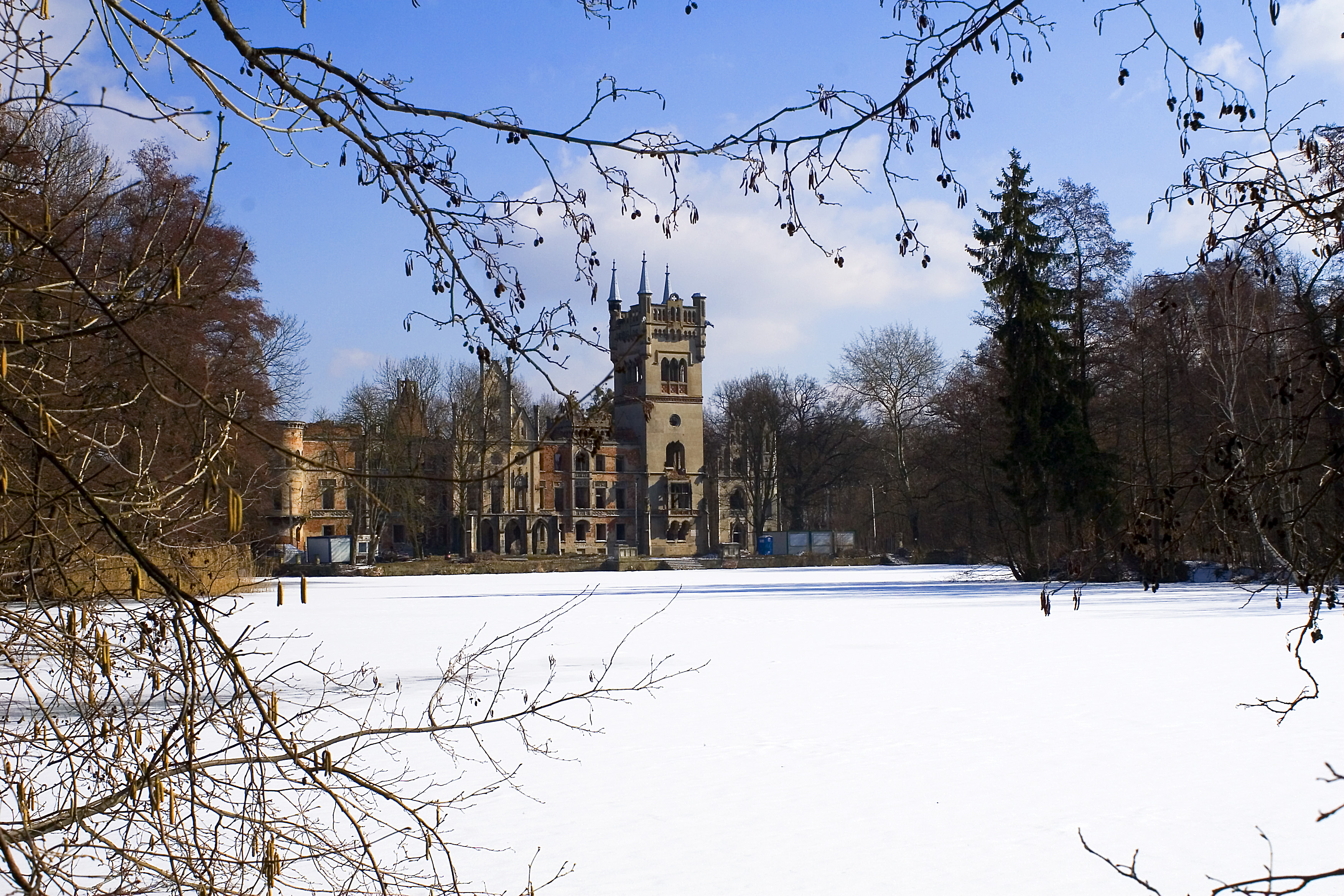
Koppitz Palace

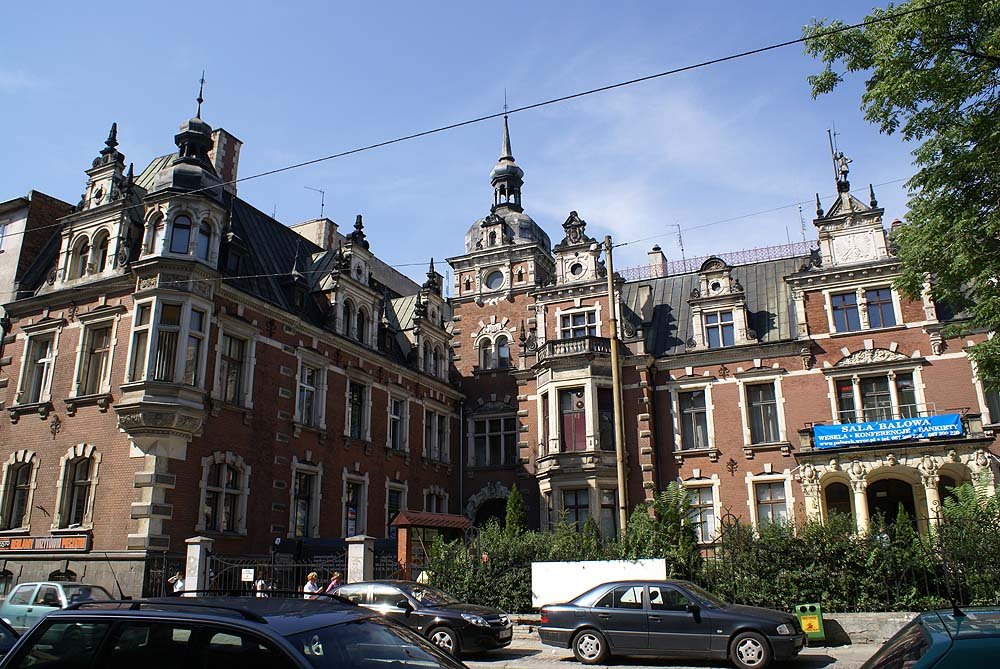
Schaffgotsch palace in Breslau
