= Hans Ulrich von Schaffgotsch =

Silesian nobleman (1595–1635)

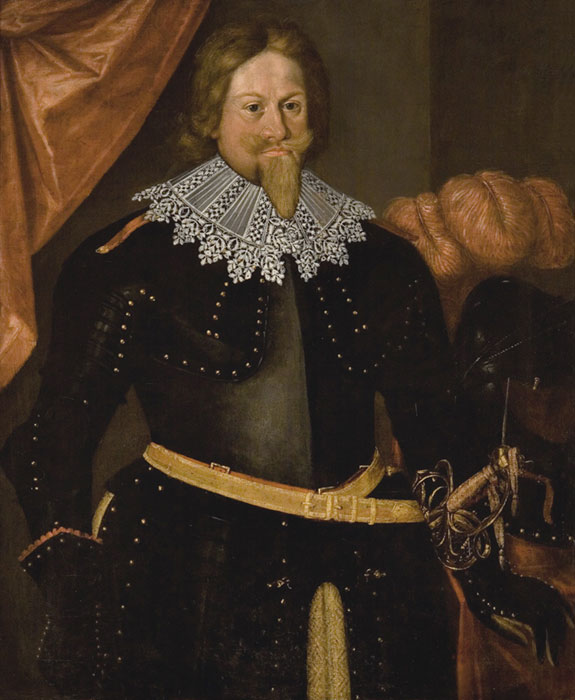
- Hans Ulrich von Schaffgotsch gen. Semperfrei von und zu Kynast and Greifenstein
- Born: 28 August 1595; Greiffenstein, Silesia, Holy Roman Empire
- Died: 24 July 1635 (aged 39); Regensburg, Holy Roman Empire
- Military career
- Allegiance: Holy Roman Empire
- Service years: 1626–1635
- Rank: Generalfeldwachtmeister
- Conflicts: Thirty Years' War: Battle of Steinau

Hans Ulrich von Schaffgotsch (28 August 1595 – 24 July 1635) was a Silesian nobleman and Generalfeldwachtmeister who fought in the Silesian front of the Thirty Years' War. He was falsely convicted of treason and executed following a purge within the army of the Holy Roman Empire that targeted officers associated with former Generalissimo Albrecht von Wallenstein.

== Early life ==
Hans Ulrich was born on 28 August 1595 in Greiffenstein castle, the son of Christoph, Freiherr von Schaffgotsch zu Trachenberg, Kynast and Greifenstein (1552-1601) and Baroness Eleonore von Promnitz (1576-1611). The Schaffgotsch family belonged to an old Silesian nobility. Upon the death of his father and his relative Adam von Schaffgotsch (1542-1601), he inherited vast estates including Greiffenberg, Greiffenstein, Kynast, Giersdorf, Trachenberg-Prausnitz, Schmiedeberg as well as territories between the Riesengebirge mountain and the river Iser. His mother married again in 1606 to Count Johann Georg of Hohenzollern (1580-1622) and had further issue. Between 1611 and 1614 Hans Ulrich attended the universities of Tübingen, Leipzig and Altdorf, while also traveling to Spain, Italy, England, France and the Netherlands. On his return, he focused his attention on administering his possessions. At the outbreak of the Thirty Years' War, Schaffgotsch was serving as a representative of the Silesian Estates in Prague, he supported the newly crowned Frederick V. On 18 October 1620, he married Princess Barbara Agnes of Liegnitz and Brieg (1593-1631), of the Silesian Piasts, sister of John Christian of Brieg and George Rudolf of Liegnitz, who jointly ruled the duchies of Brieg and Liegnitz.

== Military career ==
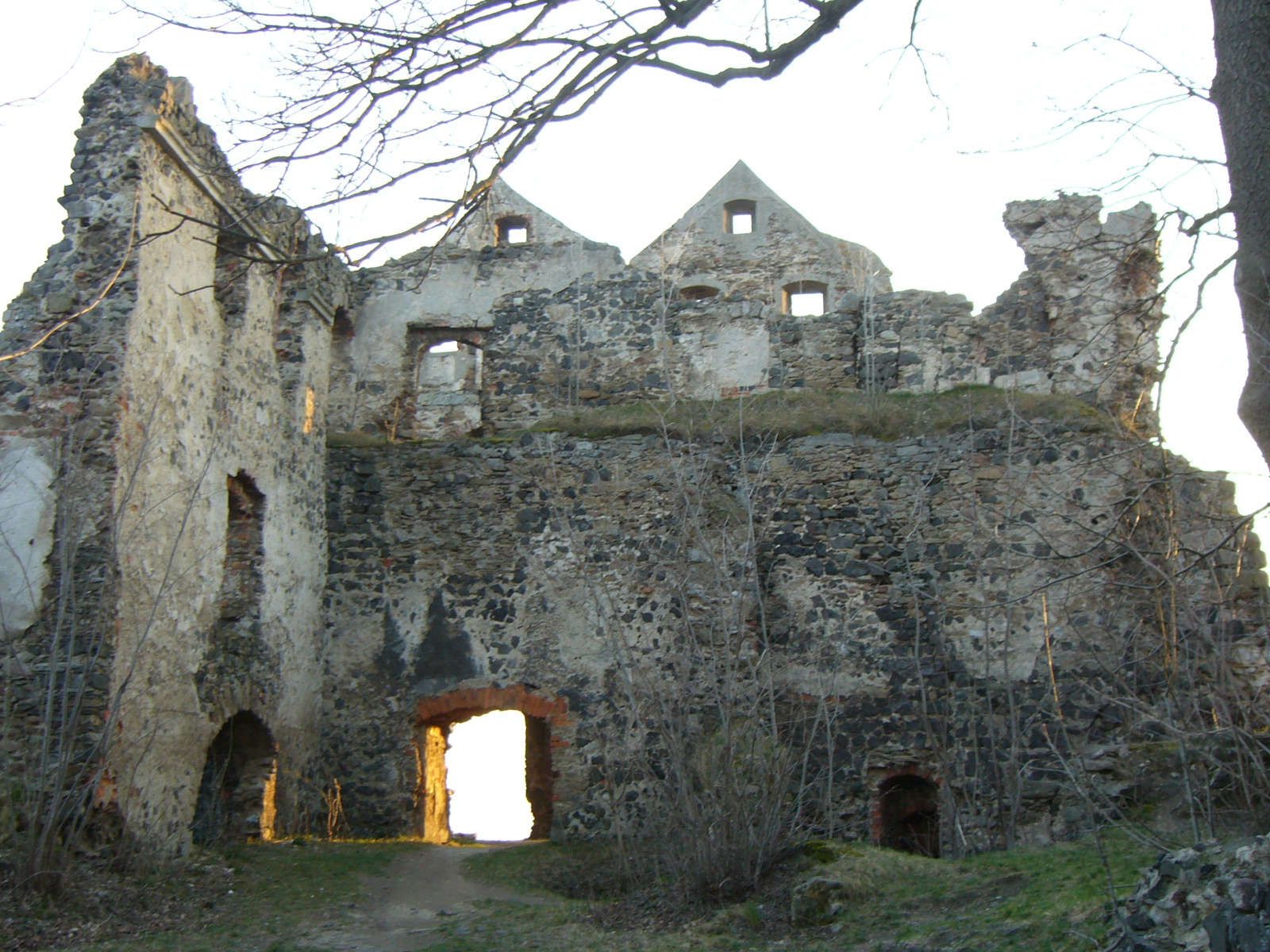
Ruins of castle Greiffenstein.

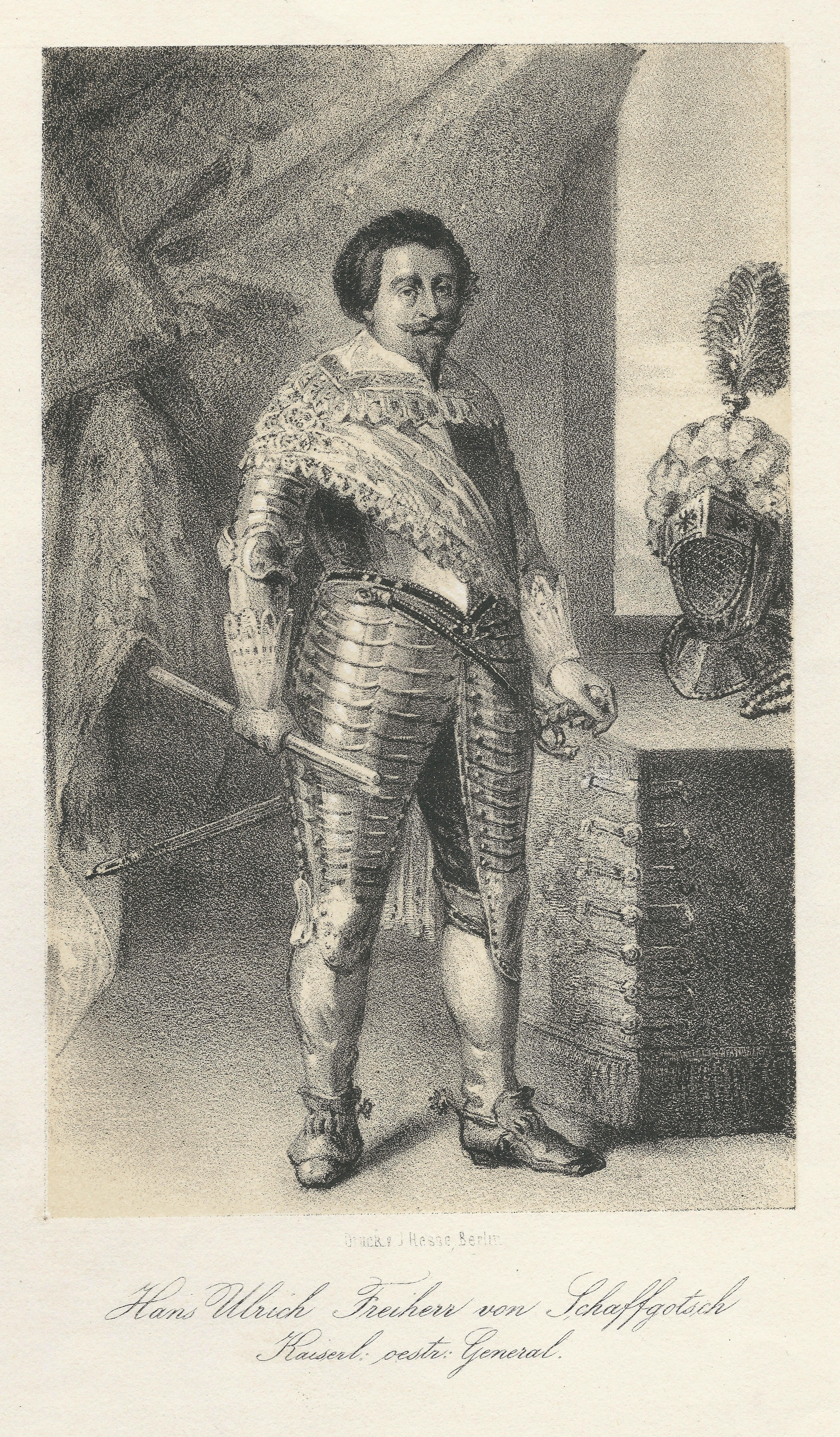
Hans Ulrich Schaffgotsch

Following the defeat of the Bohemian Estates at the Battle of White Mountain, he abandoned Frederick's cause. On 3 November 1621, he swore allegiance to Ferdinand II at the castle of Breslau. In 1626, he raised a regiment of harquebusiers in order to combat a Dano–Mansfeldian invasion of Silesia. In the autumn of the same year he joined the forces of Gabriel von Pechmann in his campaign against the Weimarers in Upper Silesia. A year later, he was promoted to the rank of general by the new Imperial Generalissimo Albrecht von Wallenstein, participating in a short summer campaign that knocked Denmark out of the war. He attended the coronation of Ferdinand III as king of Bohemia on 23 November 1627, during the accompanying tournament he received the title of Semperfrei from the emperor. The 1630 Swedish intervention in the Thirty Years' War prompted him to reorganize his regiment. On 24 July 1631, his wife Barbara Agnes died, leaving the care of his five children to his half-sister, Countess Anna Ursula von Hohenzollern (1607-1640), married to Johann Bernhard II, Freiherr von Maltzahn (1597-1667).

On 8 April 1632, he was promoted to the rank of Generalfeldwachtmeister. Between 1632 and 1633, he participated in the defense of Silesia. On 11 October 1633, Schaffgotsch's detachment of 8,000 imperial cavalrymen surprised Jindřich Matyáš Thurn's force in the outskirts of Steinau after Thurn's outposts refused to fire at the Imperialists as they were crossing downstream at Kӧben. Schaffgotsch took Thurn and general Jacob Duwall prisoners, displaying them in front of the garrisons of Liegnitz and Ohlau, which prompted their surrender. Three other garrisons refused, whilst Schaffgotsch made a failed attempt at besieging Breslau. Towards the end of 1633, the command of the Silesian front was transferred to Matthias Gallas and Rudolf von Colloredo, while Schaffgotsch was summoned to Pilsen reaching it on 4 January 1634. There general Christian von Ilow expressed his disgruntlement with the imperial court's interference into military affairs urging Schaffgotsch to sign the 19 point Statum Silesiae memorandum condemning statesman Gerhard von Questenberg. Schaffgotsch refused, claiming that such an act would be a breach of discipline. Despite this act of loyalty, Schaffgotsch's close ties with Wallenstein were to determine his future. Wallenstein was increasingly criticized for his passivity in face of a Swedish incursion into Bavaria and the collapse of Lorraine under French pressure. His dislike of courtly life and the influence exerted by the church upon the emperor created an axis of undercover opposition that launched a smear campaign against him. On 11 January 1634, Gundakar, Prince of Liechtenstein sent Ferdinand II an official request, recommending Wallenstein's liquidation. A day later, Wallenstein summoned his colonels to sign the First Pilsner Reverse, a declaration of personal loyalty, 49 of them signed immediately while Schaffgotsch and Scherffenberg gathered signatures in Silesia and Upper Austria respectively. Numerous commanders signed the Reverse so as not to arouse suspicion, while at the same time a party centered around Ottavio Piccolomini began circulating an anonymous tract that summarized the army's grudges against Wallenstein.

On 17 February, Scherffenberg was arrested in Vienna. On 18 February, a second patent was released accusing Wallenstein of conspiracy and condemning him to death, its publication was delayed so as not to split the army in two. Wallenstein's letters refuting the accusations against him remained unanswered, after realizing that the emperor was positioning troops in such a manner as to surround him he decided to flee to the Swedes, departing from his headquarters on 22 February. On 24 February, Wallenstein reached Eger where he was assassinated by a group of Scottish and Irish officers who were previously hired by Piccolomini. Schaffgotsch was arrested on the same day, later being transferred to the fortress of Glatz where he was held for eight weeks. On 1 March, the commander of the Troppau garrison (an officer under Schaffgotsch's command) declared his allegiance to Wallenstein, unaware of what had previously happened. An investigation into the incident proved that Schaffgotsch was not implicated the uprising. In the second half of April, he was sent to Vienna upon his request, where he continued to be interrogated. In July, he was again taken to Pilsen, on 20 June he was relocated to Budweis due to the risk posed by Johan Banér's invasion of Bohemia. On 18 February 1635, a military tribunal responsible for Schaffgotsch's case convened in Regensburg, with the proceedings opening in the middle of March. On 31 March 1635, Schaffgotsch was convicted of conspiracy to overthrow the emperor and sentenced to death. Schaffgotsch pleaded not guilty citing the fact that Wallenstein was not officially relieved of his command and as such he was obliged to follow his orders. On 4 July, presiding judge Heinrich von Schlick ordered the use of torture which failed to produce a confession of guilt. A day later, the emperor confirmed the death sentence which was implemented on the morning of 24 July 1635. Schaffgotsch's execution was part of larger purge that included the execution of the Troppau garrison commander and the demotion and the temporary imprisonment of seven generals including Francis Albert of Saxe-Lauenburg, all of the convicted were signatories of the Pilsner Reverse. Schaffgotsch's estates at Trachenberg-Prausnitz and the Riesengebirge were confiscated in April 1634. On 31 August 1641, the former were granted to Melchior von Hatzfeldt while the latter were gradually returned to Hans Ulrich's sons following their conversion to Catholicism.
