= Felix Schaffgotsche =

Austrian nobleman (1904–1942)

Count Felix Schaffgotsche Semperfrei von und zu Kynast und Greiffenstein
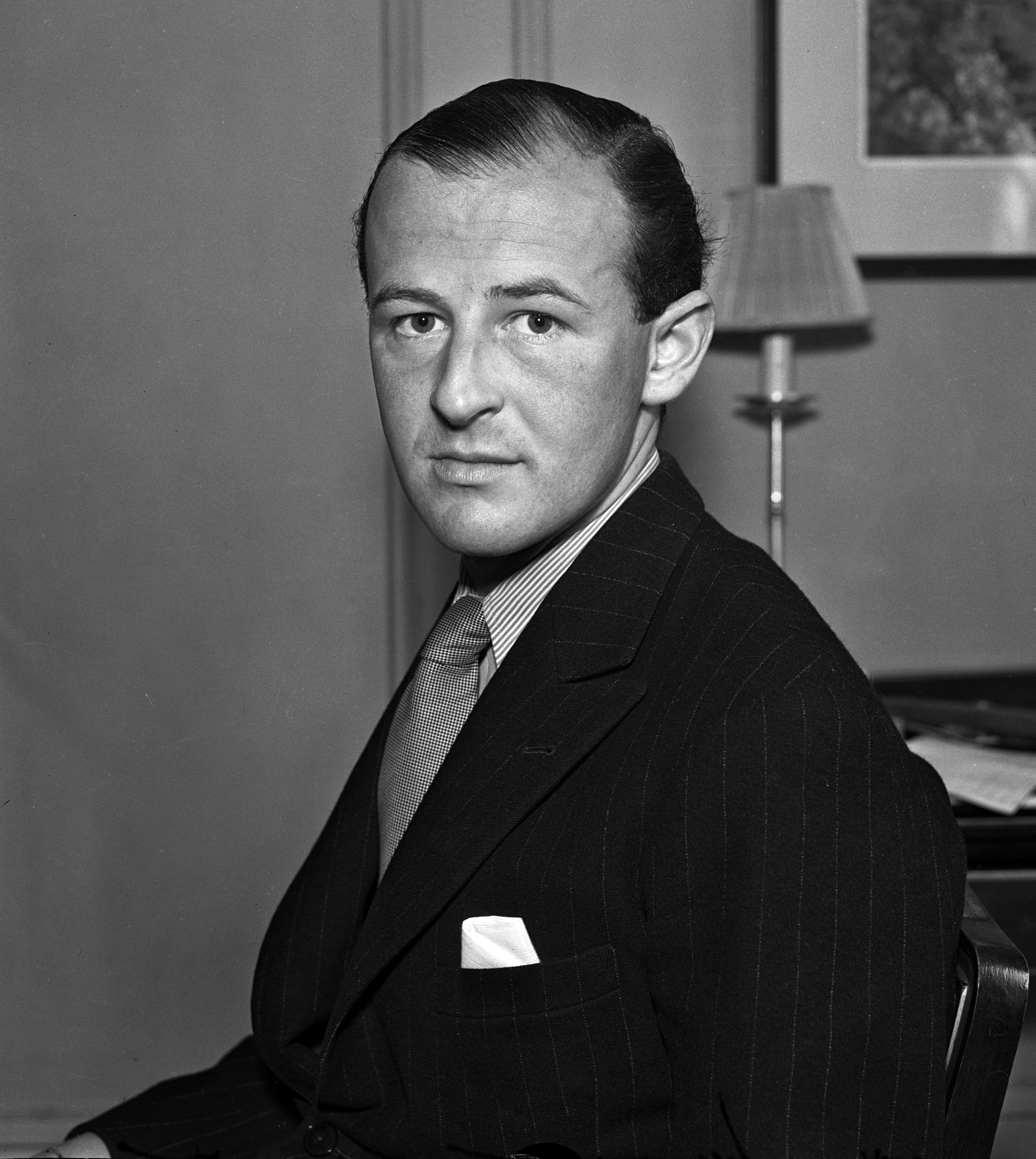
- Felix Schaffgotsche in Los Angeles (1935)
- Born: Felix Franz Julian Johann Maria Schaffgotsche; 16 February 1904; Enns, Upper Austria
- Died: 11 August 1942 (aged 38); Kurganinsk, Russia
- Occupations: Nobleman, socialite, location scout
- Known for: Development of Sun Valley resort
- Family: Schaffgotsch

Count Felix Franz Julian Johann Maria Schaffgotsche (16 February 1904 – 11 August 1942) was an Austrian nobleman, banker, socialite, and adventurer. In late 1935 and early 1936 he was W. Averell Harriman's location scout for the Sun Valley resort in Idaho. He subsequently co-developed the resort, and oversaw many of its day-to-day activities. Alongside this, he ran an elite hunting business in Austria together with his relative Prince Tassilo zu Fürstenberg. During the 1930s Schaffgotsche became increasingly supportive of the German Reich, including its annexation of Austria, though he did not join the NSDAP. Thanks to the wide social network he cultivated, he was hired, in 1940, as a legation secretary and informant for the German foreign office at the German embassy in Washington, D.C. While he was en route to the US to take up the position, this employment was cut short over an intrigue involving his homosexuality. He later joined a Wehrmacht mountain division and died in battle at the Front in the Caucasus. He was usually referred to by those close to him as Wetti, otherwise as Felix or Count Schaffgotsche.

== Family and education ==
His father was Count Franz de Paula Schaffgotsche (1859 – 1907), a major in the cavalry and aide-de-camp (Flügeladjutant) to Emperor Franz Joseph I. His mother Aglaë, née Witt von Dörring, was a granddaughter of the adventurer and writer Ferdinand Johannes Wit von Dörring and, via her maternal forebears, a descendant of the princely Auersperg family. Through his paternal lineage, Schaffgotsche was one of the last descendants of the Bohemian branch of the Schaffgotsch family; his branch's spelling of the surname varied slightly, but his title, like that of his Lower-Silesian cousins, included the territorial nobility suffix of Semperfrei von und zu Kynast und Greiffenstein. The Schaffgotsche line was extinguished with the death of his younger brother Friedrich in 1993.

Schaffgotsche was born in Enns, Upper Austria in 1904, and grew up in Linz and Altmünster, Upper Austria, in the milieu of the high nobility. His father's early death in 1907 and the repercussions of World War I, including the loss of his mother's fortune at the end of it, were the formative events of his childhood. He was schooled first in Linz at the Kaiser Franz Joseph Staatsoberrealschule and then in Vienna at the Theresianische Akademie, where his elder brother Franz de Paula died while in attendance in 1919, rendering him head of the Bohemian branch of the family. He received his baccalaureate from the Bundesgymnasium Freistadt in 1924.

== Early career ==
Initially, Schaffgotsche's career path of the mid-1920s led him from the timber trade in Donaueschingen, where he was in the employ of his close relatives in the Fürstenberg family, to shipping concerns in the Netherlands. In Amsterdam he switched to private banking and then continued in the same sector at M. Samuel & Co. (see Marcus Samuel, 1st Viscount Bearsted) in London in 1929/30 as well as at Brown Brothers Harriman & Co. in New York in 1930/31. His business ties to Averell Harriman developed into a friendship that flourished during the 1930s. At the outset of that decade, Schaffgotsche founded a separate hunting venture, the Jagd-büro ‘Austria’, together with his relative and lifelong friend Prince Tassilo zu Fürstenberg, who would later marry Clara Agnelli and become father-in-law to Diane von Fürstenberg.

== Sun Valley ==
In a bid to increase capacity utilization on the Union Pacific Railroad, Harriman hired the gregarious and well-connected Schaffgotsche in 1935 as a location scout for what was to become Sun Valley resort. After traveling for nearly two months along the Union Pacific line, a journey which Schaffgotsche documented in a detailed journal, and having explored a broad swath of the western United States, he arrived at Ketchum, Idaho in late January 1936. He quickly recognized the site's potential. Collaborating with Harriman in the development of Sun Valley, which opened in December of the same year, Schaffgotsche stayed on into the spring of 1937, returning again for the winter seasons 1937/38 and 1938/39. During the intervening summers, Schaffgotsche managed the Jagd-büro back in Austria. For Sun Valley he organized the hiring of ski school instructors (including the first ski school director Hans Hauser) and myriad other details; conceptualized future development with Harriman; played the part of animateur and promoter; and socialized with high-level guests as Harriman's stand-in during his absences.

== Political views and later career ==
Over the course of the 1930s Schaffgotsche's sympathies toward the Nazi regime grew more pronounced, though he did not join the NSDAP, the Nazi party. In his travels between Europe and Sun Valley he became friends with the British actor David Niven, who he first met in 1937 when Niven was crossing the Atlantic to Hollywood, for the filming of Dawn Patrol. Niven visited Schaffgotsche in Sun Valley during the winter of 1938 and he included tales of his friendship with Schaffgotsche in his 1971 memoir The Moon's a Balloon.

The start of World War II led to Schaffgotsche and Niven both expecting to be called up for military service. Their last encounter concluded with an emotional farewell to each other one night in Rome, towards the end of 1939, when they both got drunk on Fontana Candida. In his book Niven stated that Schaffgotsche was a "dyed-in-the-wool Nazi", and that he went off to join the SS. Due to the popularity of Niven's book, these claims received some currency in terms of Schaffgotsche's reputation, however Schaffgotsche did not join the SS. Military records indicate that Schaffgotsche absolved his initial military training in the fall of 1938 with a Wehrmacht anti-tank artillery unit (Kornwestheim 4 [E] Pz. Abw. 25), part of the conventional army, at Kornwestheim near Stuttgart. In any case their respective military careers would have been unknowable to both men at the time of their final farewell.

In the spring of 1940, owing to "his experience and the good connections he has acquired during a 10-year stay [sic] in the United States," Schaffgotsche was hired by the German foreign office (Auswärtiges Amt) (AA) as a Legation Secretary, with the ulterior agenda of serving the AA as an undercover agent or "Vertrauensmann" at the German Embassy in Washington, D.C. His talent as a networker was one of his chief qualifications for the post, as noted by a superior: "He is friends with a large number of influential Americans from industrial, banking and commercial circles, as well as with leading politicians." With a newly-issued diplomatic passport in his pocket, he left Berlin for Washington via the eastern route in late May 1940; his planned itinerary was to take him from Moscow to Manchuria by train, by ship to Japan, by steamer to San Francisco, and by plane to Washington. He made it only as far as Moscow before an intrigue involving "unpleasant rumors about his private life" induced the AA to halt his further progress and, eventually, oblige him to return to Berlin.

The foreign office may still have intended to send Schaffgotsche to Washington at a later date. At age 36, he had received a special exemption from military service within the framework of his planned employment by the AA. After the failure of his mission, he became liable again for military duty and, as a result, joined the Wehrmacht's Lehrregiment Brandenburg z.b.V. 800 where he was promoted to Unteroffizier, or corporal. Having previously volunteered for frontline duty, Schaffgotsche was first dispatched to Normandy as part of Operation Sea Lion, and then, with the beginning of Operation Barbarossa, to the Ukraine, where he was shot in the lung during a battle in July 1941. After a lengthy recovery, he returned to the front in the Caucasus during the summer of 1942. He was again shot in battle, dying from an internal haemorrhage in Kurganinsk on August 11, 1942 and was buried there in the days to follow.

== Personal life ==
Schaffgotsche was homosexual and never married. Apart from his friendships with Fürstenberg, Harriman, and Niven, he formed ties in the late 1920s to the brothers Prince Christoph von Hessen and Prince Philipp von Hessen. He was likewise associated with many society figures of the 1930s, including Cecil Beaton; the brothers Prince Albrecht ('Eddie') von Bismarck and Prince Otto von Bismarck; Chips Channon and his wife Honor Guinness; Douglas Fairbanks, Jr.; Raimund von Hofmannsthal and his wives Alice Astor and Elizabeth ('Lise') Paget; Count Friedrich von Ledebur-Wicheln; Eleonora von Mendelssohn; the sisters Princess Marie ('Missie') Vassiltchikov and Princess Tatiana Vassiltchikov; and Diana Vreeland.
