= Kopice, Opole Voivodeship =

Kopice
- Village
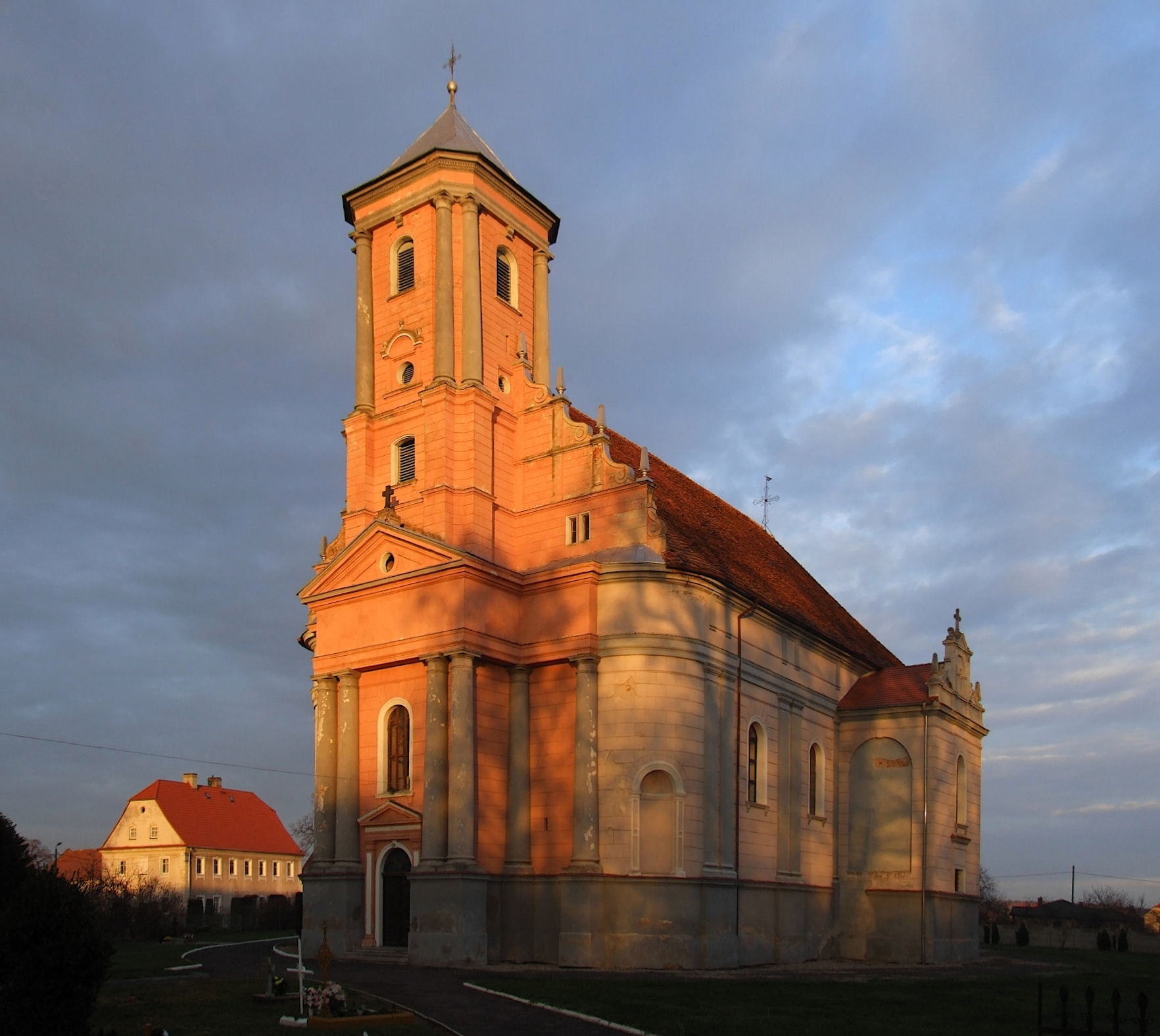
- Holy Cross Church in Kopice

- Location within Poland
- Coordinates: 50°38′53″N 17°27′21″E
- Country: Poland
- Voivodeship: Opole
- County: Brzeg
- Gmina: Grodków
- Population: 1,200

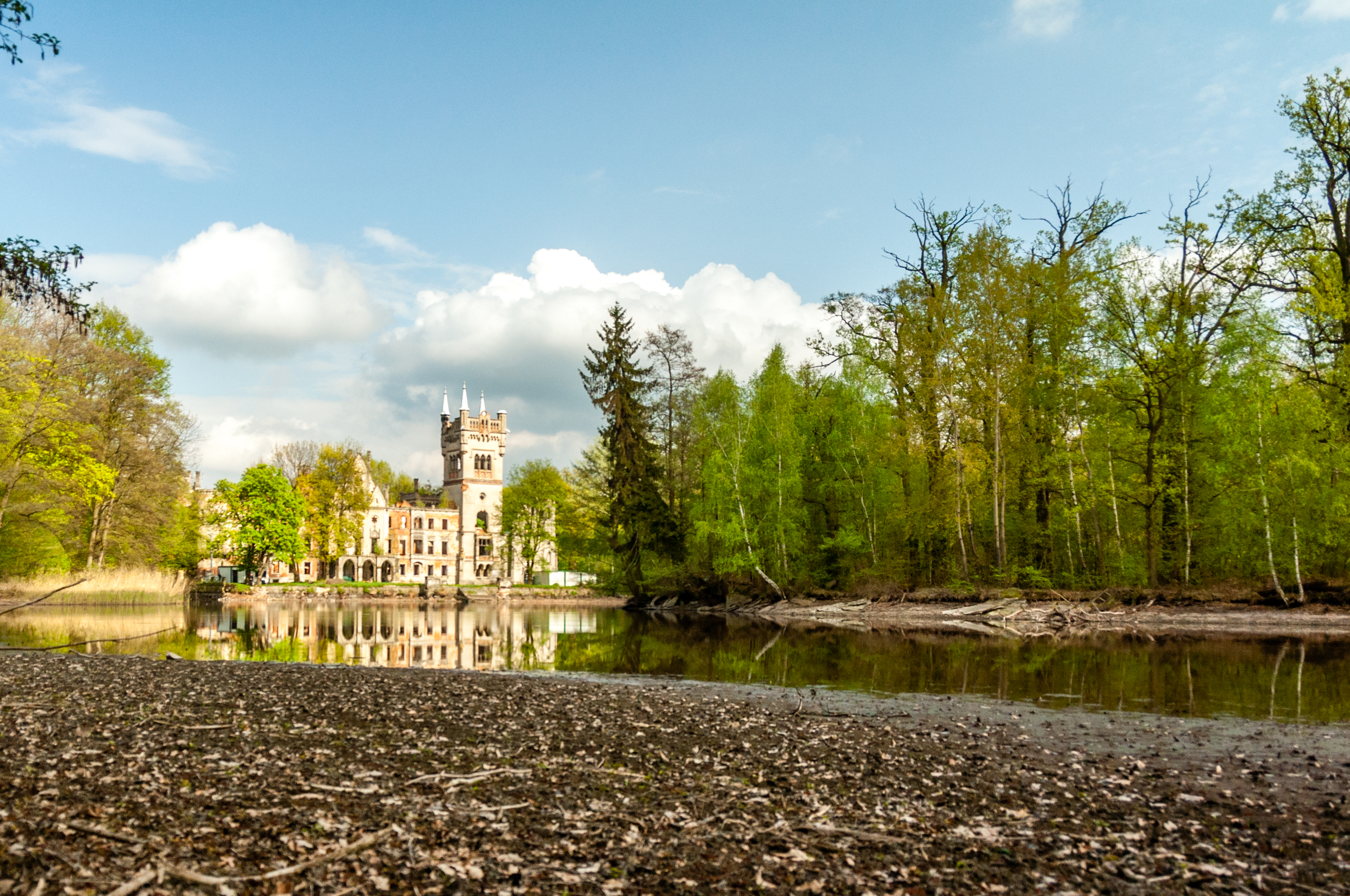
The ruined Kopice Palace and pond, 2013

Kopice [kɔˈpit͡sɛ] (German: Koppitz, 1936–1945 Schwarzengrund) is a village in the administrative district of Gmina Grodków, within Brzeg County, Opole Voivodeship, in south-western Poland.

The Schaffgotsch noble family left a Neo-Gothic palace, today in ruins.
