= Chojnik Castle =

Castle in southwestern Poland

- Zamek Chojnik
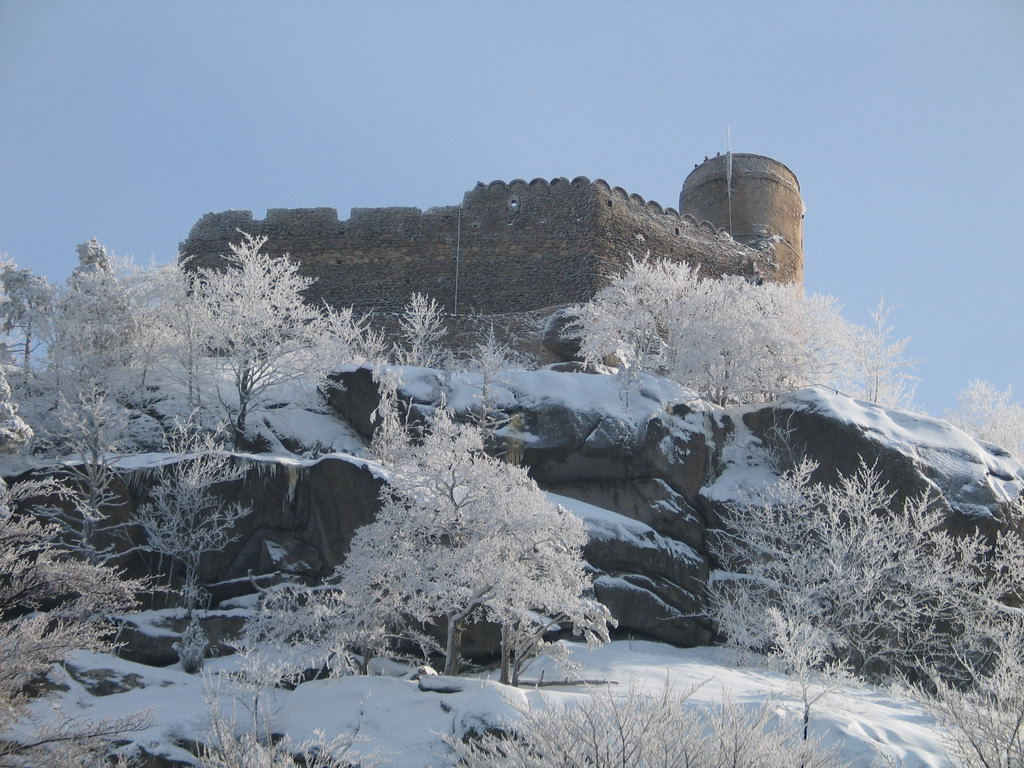
- The castle of Chojnik

- Location within Poland Location within Lower Silesian Voivodeship

General information
- Architectural style: Gothic
- Location: Jelenia Góra, Poland, Poland
- Coordinates: 50°50′01″N 15°38′37″E
- Current tenants: Brotherhood of Knights of Castle Chojnik (Bractwo Rycerskie Zamku Chojnik)
- Construction started: 13th century
- Completed: 14th century
- Demolished: 1675
- Owner: Krzysztof Leopold; Polish government (last owner)

Website
- Official Website

Chojnik Castle (pronounced HOY-nick pronounced [ˈxɔjɲik], German: Kynast, 1945–1948 Polish: Chojnasty) is a castle located above the town of Sobieszów, today part of Jelenia Góra in southwestern Poland. Its remains stand on top of the Chojnik hill (627 m (2,057 ft)) within the Karkonosze National Park, overlooking the Jelenia Góra valley.

The building of the fortress dates back to the times of the Silesian Piasts and for most of its time was in the possession of the Schaffgotsch noble family. Today the semi-ruined stronghold is a major tourist attraction and houses a hotel and a restaurant.

== History ==
The castle of Chojnik was originally raised by the order of Duke Bolko I the Strict in 1292 at the site of a former hunting lodge built by his father Bolesław II the Bald. The fortress was meant to protect the borders of Bolko's Duchy of Jawor against the menacing Wenceslaus II of Bohemia. Bolko's grandson Bolko II the Small, the last independent Piast duke, had the castle reconstructed starting from 1355.

After Bolko II had died without issue in 1368, his widow Agnes von Habsburg sold the castle to one of the courtiers, the knight Gotsche Schoff. Gotsche II Schoff modernized and expanded the castle in 1393. In the same year he donated the Gothic chapel, which was completed in 1403. The chapel devoted to Saint Catherine and Saint George featured artful paintings preserved until World War II. The castle survived the next centuries without damages. It withstood the attacks by the Hussites in 1426 and by King Matthias Corvinus of Hungary, who after his campaign of 1469 destroyed many Silesian castles. In 1529 Ulrich I von Schaffgotsch expanded the building with two forecourts, depots and a pillory, and at the end of the 16th century Renaissance modifications were carried out.

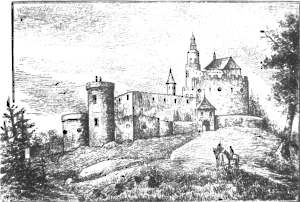
Lithography of Chojnik Castle from the beginning of the 19th century

During the Thirty Years' War Hans Ulrich von Schaffgotsch, Lord of Kynast - though a Protestant - after the 1620 Battle of White Mountain supported Emperor Ferdinand II and served as a general in the Imperial army under Albrecht von Wallenstein. After Wallenstein's persecution and assassination in 1634 Schaffgotsch as his liegeman was arrested, accused of high treason and executed one year later. Ferdinand II seized his property and had Kynast castle occupied by his troops, who resisted the attacks of the Swedish forces. Ferdinand III added new bastions to the castle in 1648 and finally restituted it to Christoph Leopold von Schaffgotsch, Hans Ulrich's son, in 1650. Still during the latter's lifetime, in 1675, the castle that has never been conquered burnt down completely after being struck by lightning and was not reconstructed.

The comital family relocated down into the valley to the old palace of Warmbrunn (today Cieplice Śląskie-Zdrój) and the destroyed castle became a tourist attraction already in the early 18th century. It was visited by the Prussian royal family and poets like Heinrich von Kleist and Johann Wolfgang von Goethe as well as Theodor Körner, who immortalized the ruin in one of his poems and made it famous all over Germany. In 1822, the Schaffgotschs added a tavern and harbourage to the castle and three years later rebuilt the tower. In the 1920s the old legends were resuscitated by Waldemar Müller-Erhardt, and in the next years these folk plays were performed there.

The ruins remained in the property of the Schaffgotsch dynasty until in 1945 the family was expelled. In 1964 the Polish state restored the ruins and rebuilt the mountain hut.

== Kunegunda legend ==
The ruins of Chojnik are tied to the myth of Kunegunda, a castle lord's daughter desired by many knights. As she had no intention to enter into marriage she promised to espouse the bold man who would complete a circuit along the castle's walls on a horseback, knowing that on the steep slopes horse and rider must fall into the chasm. Many tried and perished until a proud nobleman came along, who appealed to Kunegunda's eyes. Though she declared to abandon the precondition and to marry him right away, the knight insisted to take the risk and he succeeded. Instead of accepting her proposal he scolded her for her cruelty and departed. Kunegunda however, deeply humiliated, lunged into the abyss herself.

== Gallery ==
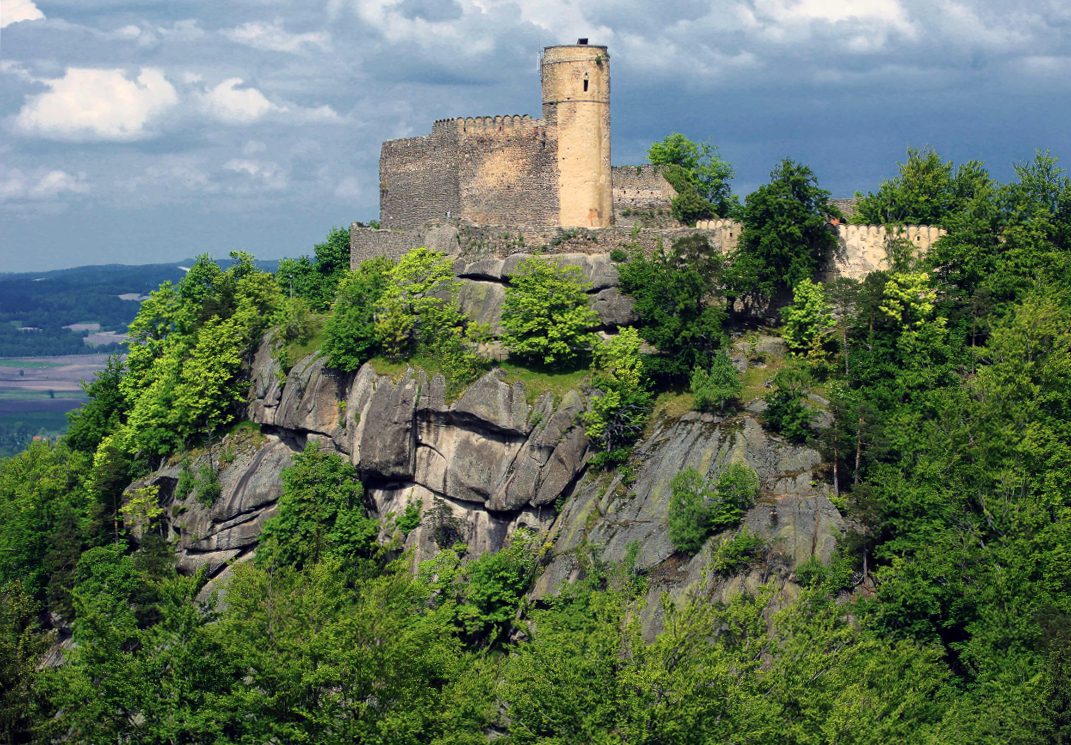
Chojnik Castle

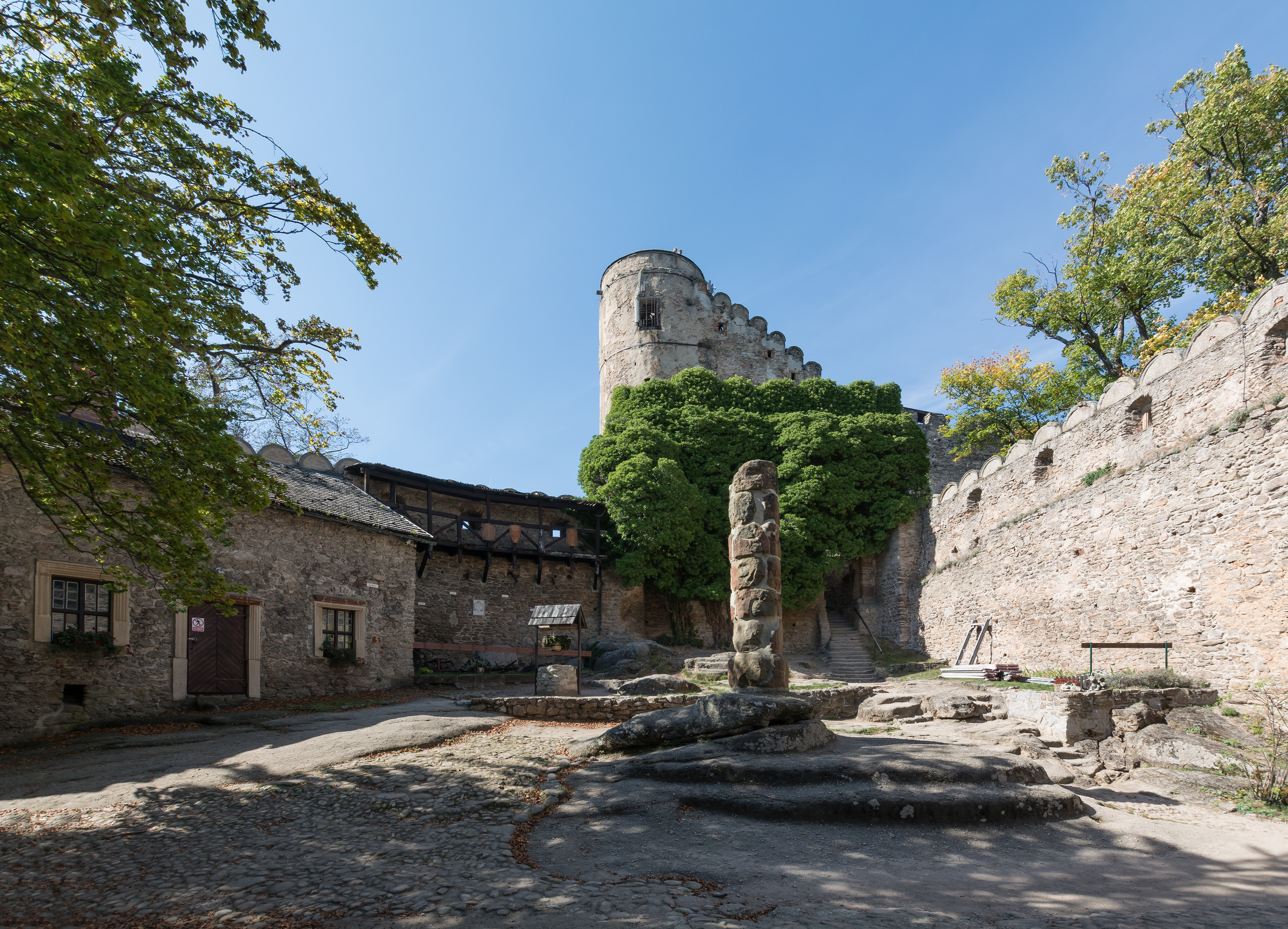
Inner courtyard

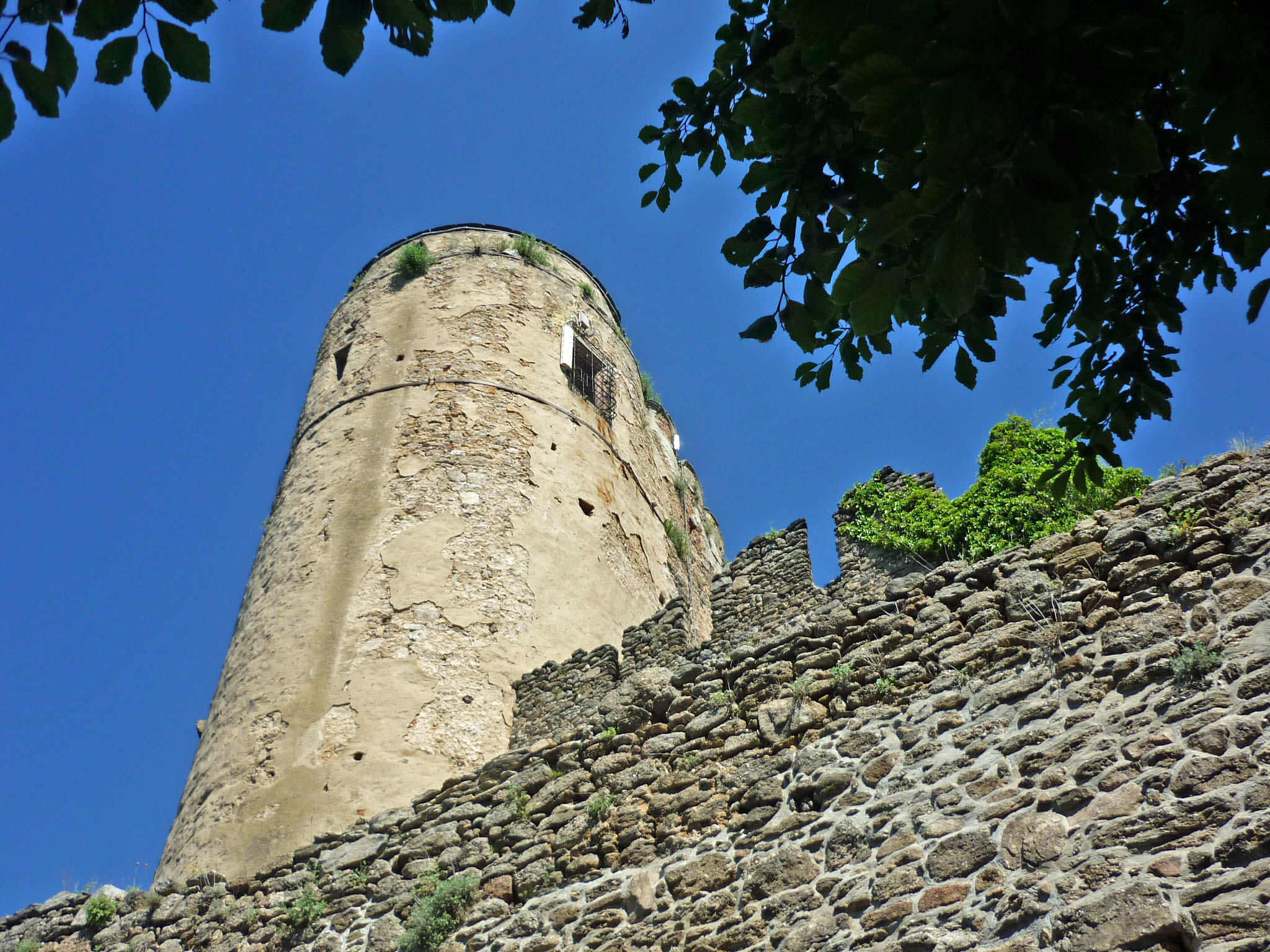
Castle tower

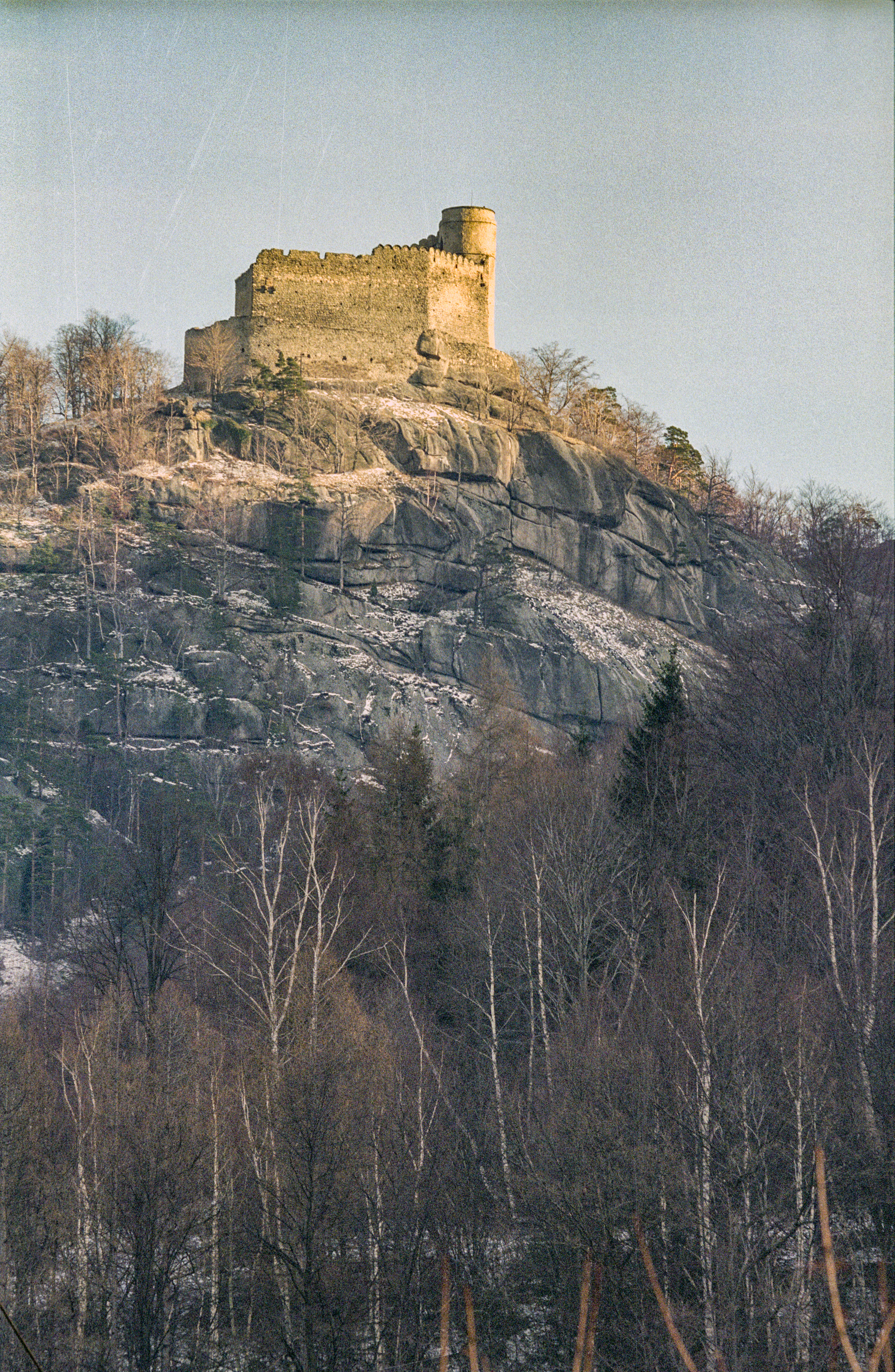
Castle seen from distance

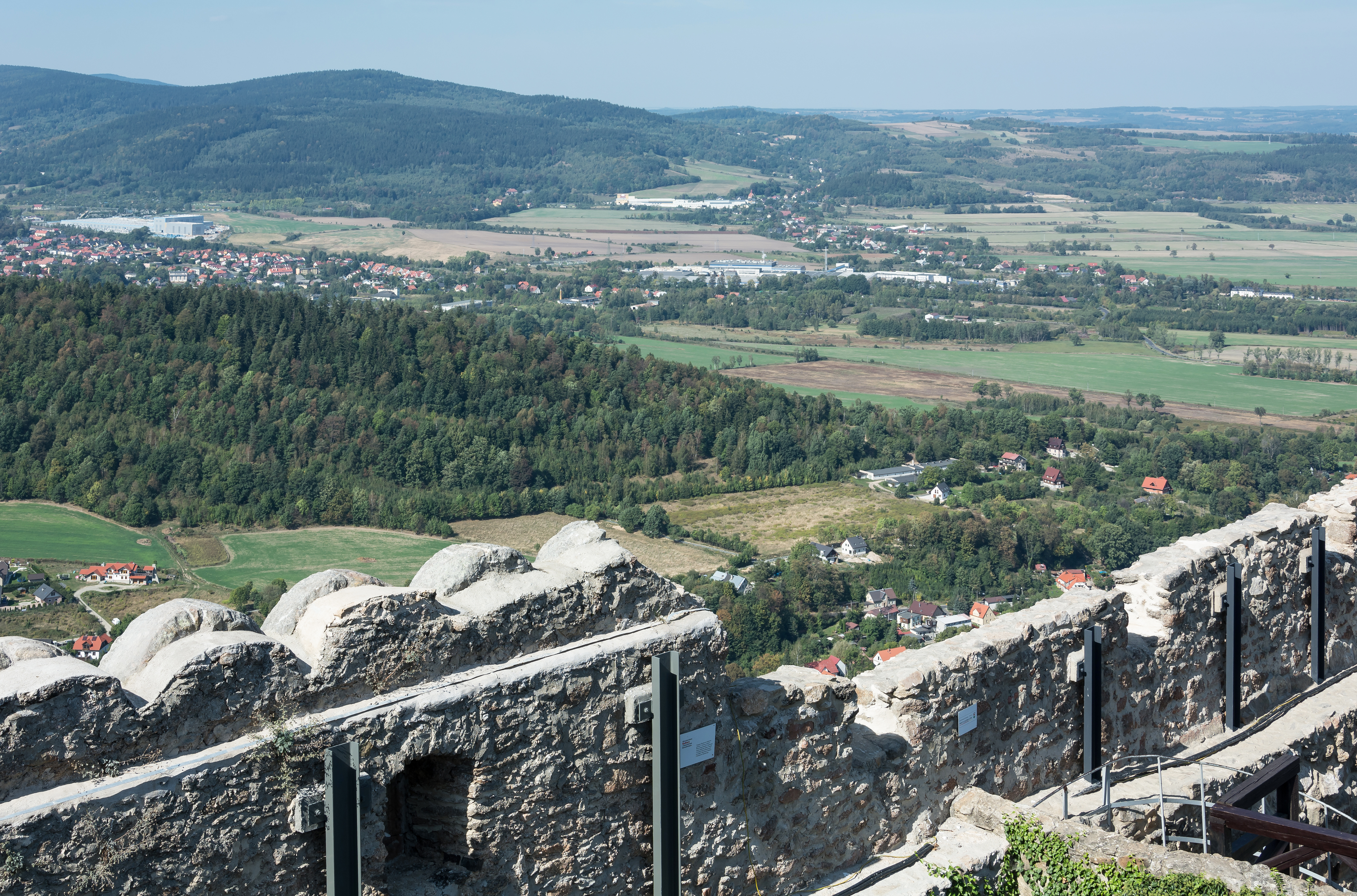
View from the castle

== See also ==
- Castles in Poland

== Book ==
- Arkadiusz Kuzio-Podrucki: Schaffgotschowie. Dzieje wielkiego rodu z Europy Środkowej, Katowice 2024, ISBN 978-8367152-61-7. (polish)
