= Holy Cross Church, Kopice =

Coordinates: 50.3852°N 17.2704°E

Holy Cross Church
- Kościół Świętego Krzyża
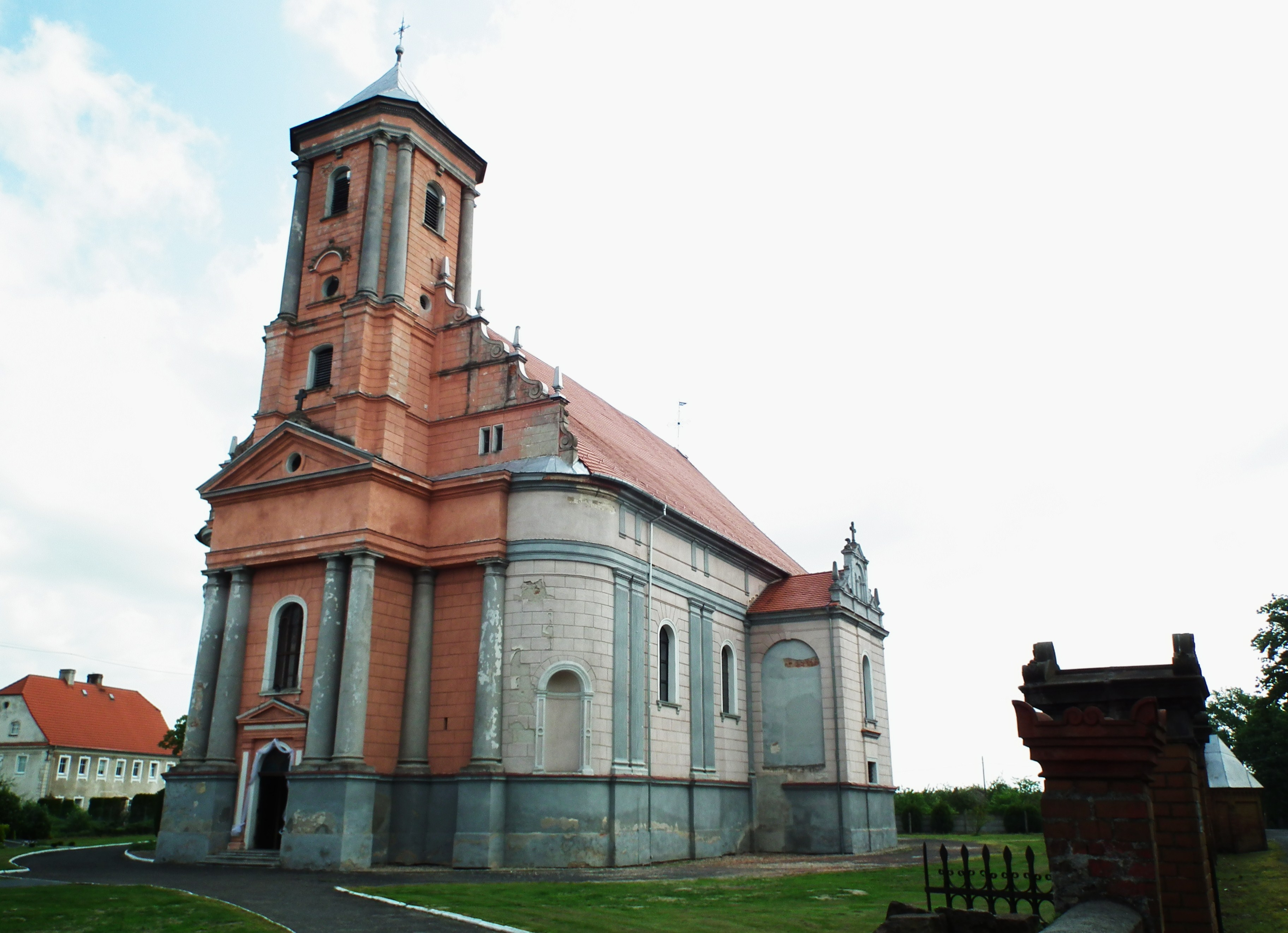
- Holy Cross Church
- Holy Cross Church
- Location: Kopice
- Country: Poland
- Denomination: Roman Catholic
- Website: Official Website

Architecture
- Style: Neoclassicist
- Groundbreaking: 1802
- Completed: 1822

Holy Cross Church in Kopice, Poland, is a Neoclassicist church built between 1802 and 1822.

A Neoclassicist, single-nave gable roofed church. The main entrance is characterised by a column portal, decorated with a tri-point tympanum. The elevations are plasterworked and in some parts bossaged.
