= Bundesrealgymnasium Linz Fadingerstraße =

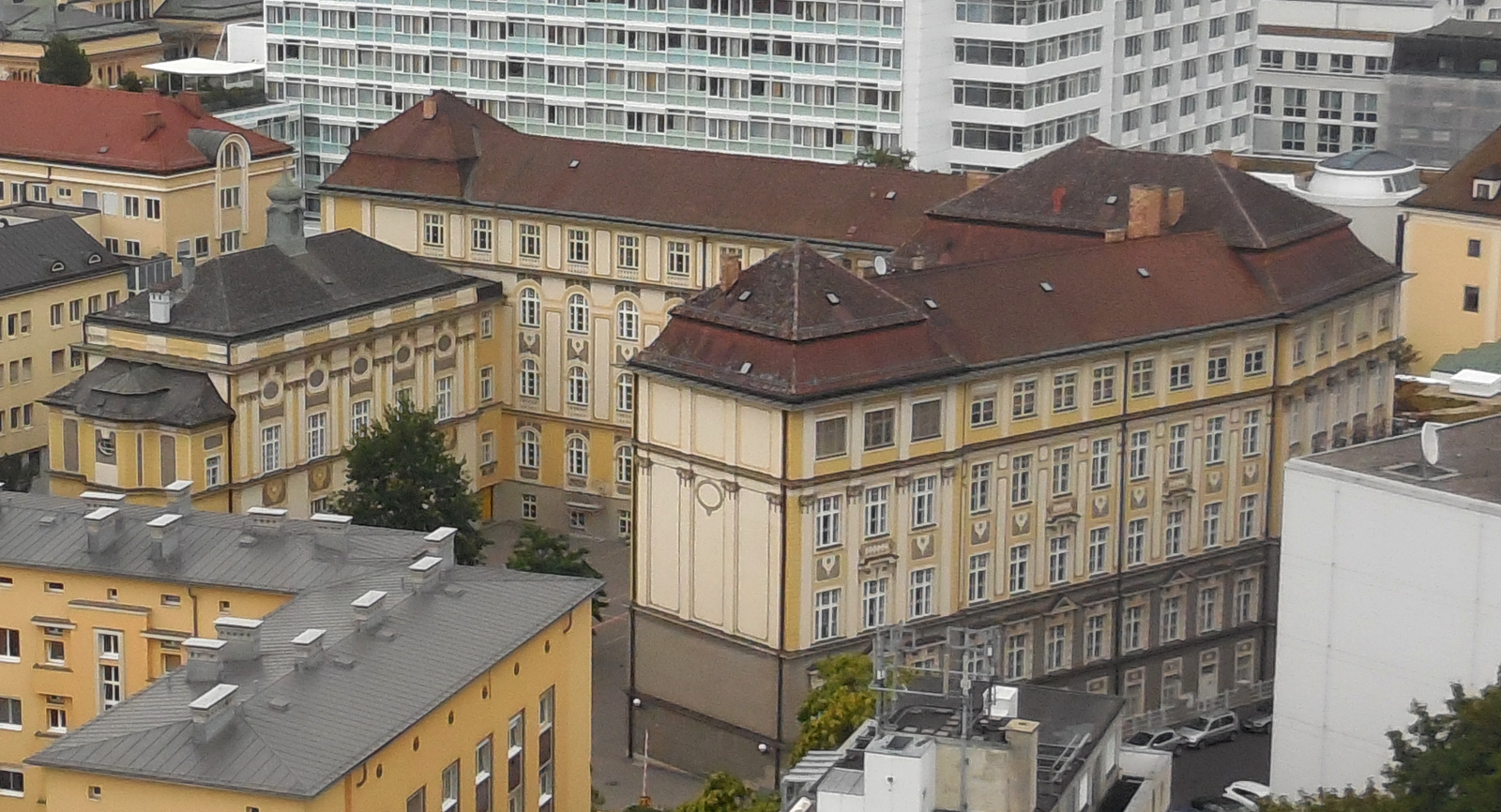
- Bundesrealgymnasium Fadingerstraße seen from the "Keine Sorgen Tower"

Location
- Linz; Austria; 48.3045°N 14.2928°E

Information
- Type: Secondary school
- Established: 5 April 1851
- Principal: Sylvia Bäck
- Faculty: ca. 75
- Grades: 5–13
- Age range: 10–18
- Enrollment: ca. 630
- Website: www.fadi.at

The Bundesrealgymnasium Linz Fadingerstraße (Fadingergymnasium) is a specialized secondary school in the city center of Linz, Austria. It is located on Fadingerstraße, between Pochestraße and Bethlehemstraße. The school is a grammar school focusing on media and sciences, and offers both lower and upper secondary education with optional Matura.

== History ==
The school was founded in 1851 as the Kaiser Franz Joseph Staatsoberrealschule ('Franz Joseph I of Austria state secondary school') on the initiative of the citizens of Linz and the writer and state school inspector of elementary schools for Upper Austria, Adalbert Stifter in Steingasse. An expansion was completed by autumn 1852, allowing for the enrollment of all grades. By the 1890s the building's facilities in Steingasse had become inadequate; a new building was finally approved 1903/1904, and opened in 1909 on the corner of Fadinger Strasse and Bethlehemstrasse.

The school was renamed Bundesrealgymnasium Linz Fadingerstraße after the Austrian Republic was founded in 1918.

== Notable alumni ==
- Adolf Eichmann (1906–1962), German-Austrian Nazi Party official and convicted war criminal, a major organizer of the Holocaust
- Adolf Hitler (1889–1945), German politician and leader of the Nazi Party (Nationalsozialistische Deutsche Arbeiterpartei; NSDAP) (1900–1904)
- Ernst Kaltenbrunner (1903–1946), Austrian SS official and convicted war criminal, a major organizer of the Holocaust.
- Ludwig Wittgenstein (1889–1951), Austrian-British philosopher (1903–1906)
