= Sobieszów =

- Neighbourhood of Jelenia Góra
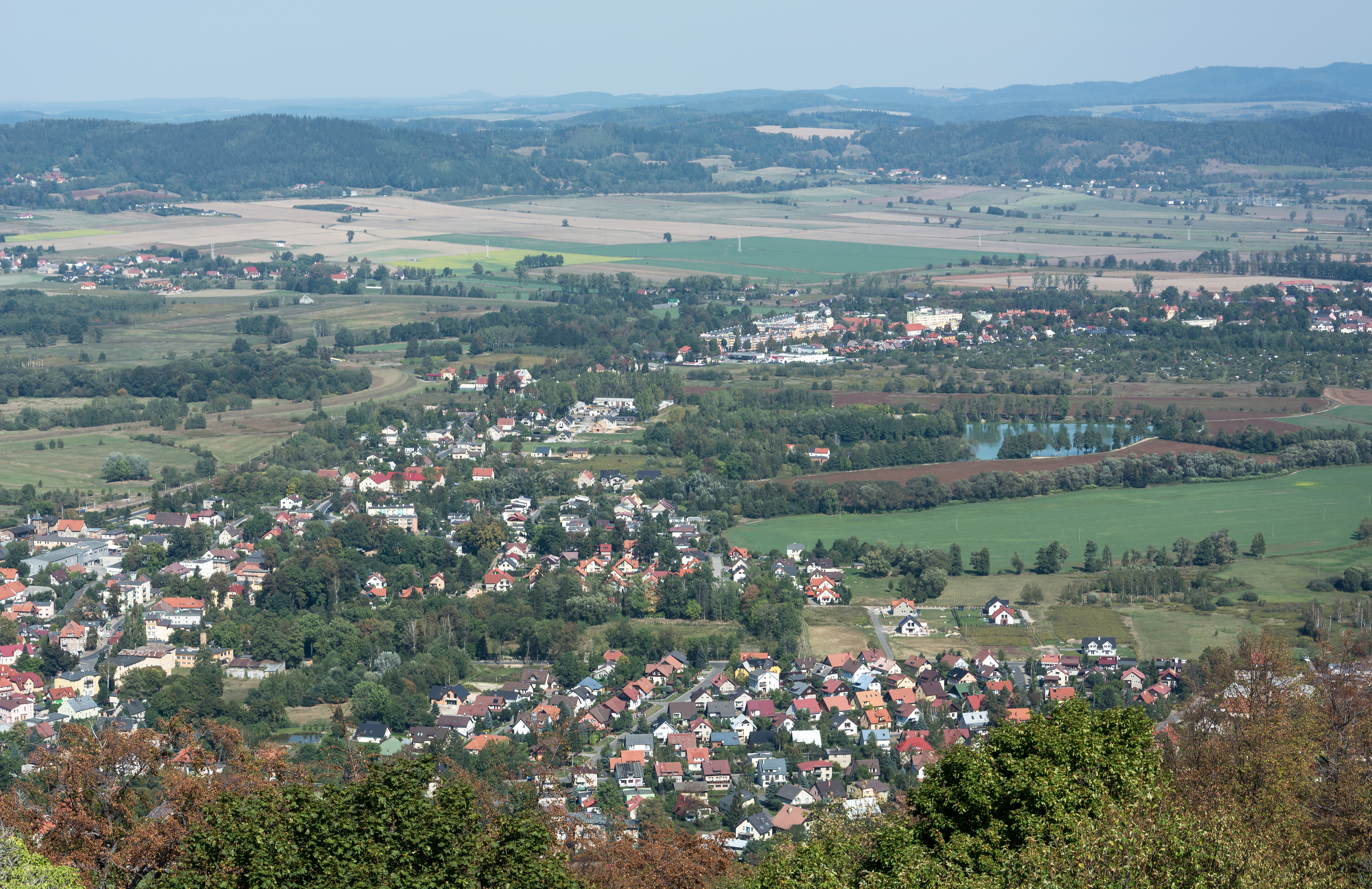
- View of Sobieszów from the Chojnik Castle

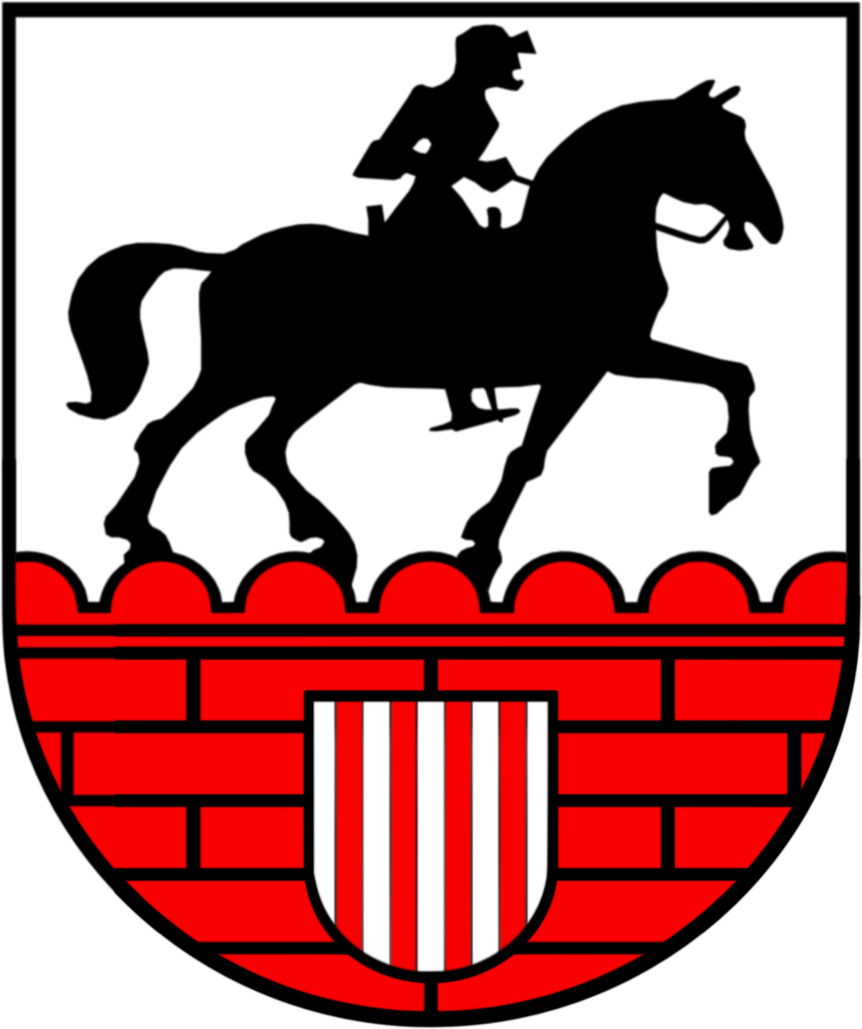
- Coat of arms

- Location within Poland
- Coordinates: 50°51′12″N 15°38′4″E
- Country: Poland
- Voivodeship: Lower Silesian
- County/City: Jelenia Góra
- Founded: 13th century
- Town rights: 1962
- Included within city limits: 1976
- Time zone: UTC+1 (CET)
  - Summer (DST): UTC+2 (CEST)
- Postal code: 58–570
- Area code: +48 075
- Vehicle registration: DJE
- Website: http://www.jeleniagora.pl/

Sobieszów is a part of Jelenia Góra in Poland, located in the south-western part of the city.

It is located near Karkonosze National Park. The ruined castle Chojnik is located in Sobieszów.
